= Raneo Abu =

Filipino politician (born 1967)

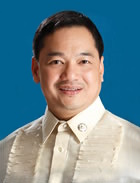
- Portrait during the 16th Congress

Member of the Philippine House of Representatives from Batangas's 2nd District
- In office June 30, 2013 – June 30, 2022
- Preceded by: Hermilando Mandanas
- Succeeded by: Gerville Luistro

Deputy Speaker of the House of Representatives of the Philippines
- In office July 22, 2019 – November 18, 2020
- House Speaker: Alan Peter Cayetano; Lord Allan Velasco
- In office July 25, 2016 – June 30, 2019
- House Speaker: Pantaleon Alvarez; Gloria Macapagal Arroyo

Member of the Bauan Municipal Council
- In office June 30, 1992 – June 30, 1995

Personal details
- Born: May 12, 1967 (age 59) Bauan, Batangas, Philippines
- Party: Nacionalista (2012–present)
- Other political affiliations: Independent (1992–2012)
- Spouse: Maria Paz Dolor
- Children: 3
- Education: Bauan High School; Batangas State University; University of Batangas
- Occupation: Politician
- Net worth: ₱15.7 million (2018)

Raneo "Ranie" Enriquez Abu (born May 12, 1967) is a Filipino politician serving as the Representative of Batangas's 2nd congressional district from 2013 to 2022. He served as the Deputy Speaker of the House of Representatives of the Philippines from 2016 until his removal on 2020.

== Early life ==
Raneo Abu was born on May 21, 1965 He completed elementary and high school education in public schools in Lemery. In college, he took up civil engineering at Batangas State University (formerly Pablo Borbon Memorial Institute of Technology) in 1983 to 1984 before transferring to Lyceum of Batangas(formerly Western Philippine Colleges) to take up sociology from 1985 to 1988. He was a working student, notably at a bakery every summer. However, he dropped out from the university to help his parents by working.

== Political career ==
=== Committee Support Services Division of the Philippine Senate (1990–1992) ===
Abu's stint in government service started in 1988 when he became a youth development assistant in the office of then-Governor Vicente Mayo. He also worked as a photocopying attendant at the Committee Support Services Division of the Senate from 1990 to 1992.

=== Municipal Councilor of Bauan (1992–1995) ===
In 1994, he ran as municipal councilor of Bauan and won. However, he served for only one term as he did not seek re-election in 1997 because his father was diagnosed with heart disease.

=== Post-municipal councilorship (1995–2013) ===
Instead, his father asked him to help Hermilando Mandanas, who was then running for governor in 1995. Abu served as executive assistant for Mandanas, a position that he kept until 2004 when he was appointed supervising political affairs officer in the House of Representatives under the office of Mandanas, who was then elected representative of the 2nd district of Batangas.

=== House of Representatives (2013–2022) ===
In 2013, Abu ran for representative of the 2nd district of Batangas under Nacionalista Party and won. He defeated board member and actor Christopher de Leon of the Liberal Party and Godofredo Berberabe of the United Nationalist Alliance. He was re-elected in 2016 and in 2019.

On July 10, 2020, Abu was one of the 70 representatives who voted to "yes" to deny the franchise renewal of ABS-CBN. In January 2021, Abu is announced to be part of the new bloc "BTS sa Kongreso" (named after the K-pop boy band group BTS of South Korea), a coalition group formed by Taguig–Pateros Representative and former House Speaker Alan Peter Cayetano during the 18th Congress.

In 2022, Abu is already in term limit as a congressman. He endorsed his daughter, Reina Abu to succeed him but she lost to Gerville Luistro.

=== 2025 House of Representatives election ===
Abu ran again for congressman in 2025 but lost to his successor, incumbent Gerville Luistro.

== Personal life ==
Abu is married to Maria Paz Dolor, who has worked as a domestic helper in Italy, with whom he has three children. Their eldest daughter, Maria Reina Abu-Reyes, is a physician by profession who is also in politics, being a member of the Batangas Provincial Board from the 2nd district since 2025.

House of Representatives of the Philippines
Preceded by Hermilando Mandanas	Member of the House of Representatives from Batangas's 2nd district 2013–2022	Succeeded by Gerville Luistro
