= Governor of Batangas =

Local chief executive

- Gobernador ng Lalawigan ng Batangas
- Incumbent; Vilma Santos Recto since June 30, 2025
- Style: Mr./Madam Governor, Honorable
- Residence: People's Mansion, Batangas Government Center, Batangas City
- Seat: Batangas Provincial Capitol
- Term length: 3 years, renewable
- Inaugural holder: Felix Ma. Roxas
- Formation: 1901
- Website: Official Website of the Province of Batangas

The Governor of Batangas (Filipino: Punong Lalawigan ng Batangas) is the local chief executive of the Philippine province of Batangas. The governor holds office at the Batangas Provincial Capitol in Batangas City and its residence is at the People's Mansion located at the Provincial Government Complex. Like all local government heads in the Philippines, the governor is elected via popular vote, and may not be elected for a fourth consecutive term (although the former governor may return to office after an interval of one term). In case of death, resignation or incapacity, the vice governor becomes the governor. Along with the governors of Cavite, Laguna, Quezon and Rizal, he sits in the Regional Development Council of the Calabarzon Region.

== List of governors ==
Nacionalista Liberal Lakas–CMD KBL UNA PDP–Laban
No.	Portrait	Governor	Term of office	Place of origin
1		Felix Maria Fernandez Roxas	1901–1902	Manila
2		Simeon M. Luz	1902–1904	Lipa
3		Gregorio Aguilera y Solis; November 1, 1869 – January 15, 1921 (Aged 51)	1904–1907	Lipa
4		Jose Lozada	1907–1908	Lipa
5		Galicano Apacible; June 25, 1864 – March 2, 1949 (Aged 84)	1907–1909	Balayan
6		Pablo Borbon; January 24, 1874 – June 11, 1927 (Aged 53)	1910–1916	Batangas City
7		Nicolas Gonzales	1916–1919	Tanauan
8		Braulio de Villa	1919–1922	San Juan
9		Modesto Castillo; June 15, 1885 – August 31, 1960 (Aged 75)	1922–1930	Tanauan
10		Vicente Noble	1930–1937	Taal
11		Vicente J. Caedo	1938–1940	Batangas City
12		Maximo M. Malvar	1941–1945 (elected)	Santo Tomas
13		Col. Fortunato Borbon; February 28, 1890 – March 25, 1954 (Aged 64)	February 1945 – November 19, 1945	Batangas City
14		Vicente del Rosario	December 1945 – May 25, 1946	Lipa
15		Modesto Castillo	June 1946 – December 31, 1947	Tanauan
16		Feliciano Leviste; June 9, 1897 – March 29, 1976 (Aged 78)	January 1, 1948 – December 1, 1971 (23 years, 334 days)	Malvar
17		Antonio Carpio	January 1 – February 17, 1972 (47 days)	
18		Jose Antonio C. Leviste; January 14, 1940 (Age 82)	February 18, 1972 – March 2, 1980 (8 years, 13 days)	Malvar
19		Jose C. Laurel V	March 3, 1980 – February 1, 1988 (7 years, 309 days)	Tanauan
20		Vicente A. Mayo; December 15, 1932 — December 19, 2021 (Aged 89)	February 2, 1988 – June 30, 1995 (7 years, 148 days)	Lipa City
21		Hermilando Ingco Mandanas; March 25, 1944 (Age 82)	June 30, 1995 – June 30, 2004 (9 years, 0 days)	Batangas City
22		Armando Carpio Sanchez; June 15, 1952 — April 27, 2010 (Aged 57)	June 30, 2004 – June 30, 2007 (3 years, 0 days)	Santo Tomas
23		Rosa Vilma Tuazon Santos-Recto; November 3, 1953 (Age 72)	June 30, 2007 – June 30, 2016 (9 years, 0 days)	Lipa City
24		Hermilando Ingco Mandanas; March 25, 1944 (Age 82)	June 30, 2016 – June 30, 2025 (9 years, 0 days)	Batangas City
25		Rosa Vilma Tuazon Santos-Recto; November 3, 1953 (Age 72)	June 30, 2025 – Present (1 year, 69 days)	Lipa City

== Elections ==
- 1988 Batangas local elections
- 1992 Batangas local elections
- 1995 Batangas local elections
- 1998 Batangas local elections
- 2001 Batangas local elections
- 2004 Batangas local elections
- 2007 Batangas local elections
- 2010 Batangas local elections
- 2013 Batangas local elections
- 2016 Batangas local elections
- 2019 Batangas local elections
- 2022 Batangas local elections
- 2025 Batangas local elections
