= Mark Llandro Mendoza =

Filipino politician and Secretary of the Senate of the Philippines (born 1973)

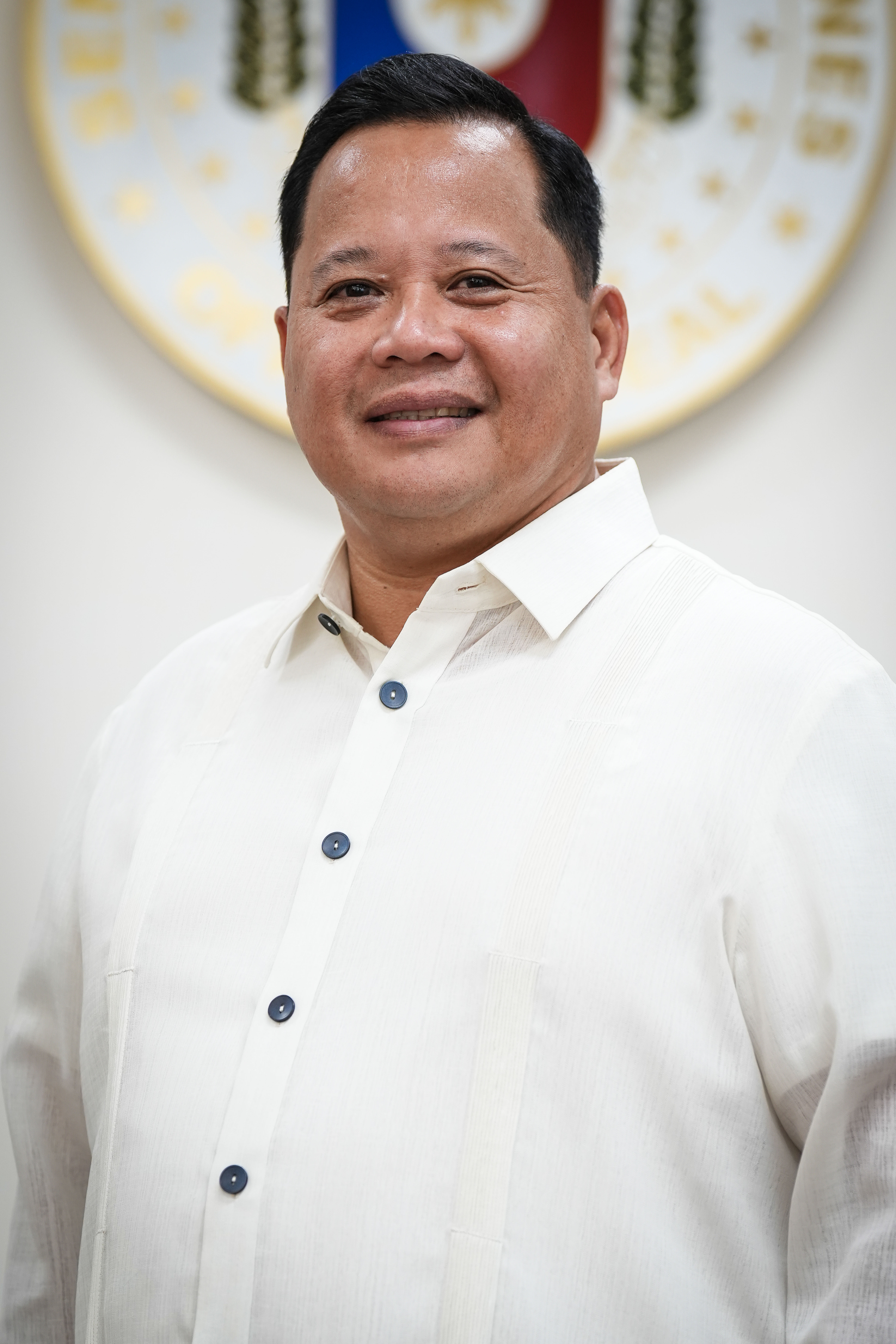
- Official portrait, 2026

23rd Secretary of the Senate of the Philippines
- In office February 2, 2026 – May 18, 2026
- Preceded by: Renato Bantug Jr.
- Succeeded by: Jose Luis Montales

Presidential Adviser on Legislative Affairs and Head of Presidential Legislative Liaison Office
- In office August 23, 2022 – June 19, 2025
- President: Bongbong Marcos
- Preceded by: Irene Afortunado (OIC)
- Succeeded by: Adrian Bersamin

Secretary General of the House of Representatives of the Philippines
- In office November 18, 2020 – July 25, 2022
- Preceded by: Jose Luis Montales
- Succeeded by: Reginald Velasco

Member of the Philippine House of Representatives from Batangas' 4th District
- In office June 30, 2007 – June 30, 2016
- Preceded by: Oscar L. Gozos
- Succeeded by: Lianda Bolilia

Personal details
- Born: August 29, 1973 (age 52)
- Party: NPC (2007–present)
- Parent: Leandro Mendoza (father)
- Occupation: Politician

Mark Llandro "Dong" Latorre Mendoza (born August 29, 1973) is a Filipino politician. He served as the Secretary of the Senate of the Philippines from February to May 2026, and as the Secretary-General of the House of Representatives from 2020 to 2022. He was a member of the cabinet of President Bongbong Marcos serving the Presidential Adviser on Legislative Affairs and head of the Presidential Legislative Liaison Office until 2025.

== Political career ==
A member of the Nationalist People's Coalition, he previously served as the Secretary General of the House of Representatives of the Philippines under the speakership of Marinduque lone district representative Lord Allan Velasco. He also served as a member of the House of Representatives representing the 4th district of Batangas from 2007 to 2016. He also unsuccessfully ran for governor of Batangas in 2016 and for a comeback to the Congress as representative of the same district in 2019.

He was elected Secretary of the Senate of the Philippines on February 2, 2026 under the Senate presidency of Tito Sotto.

== Personal life ==
He is the son of Leandro Mendoza, a former secretary of Transportation and Communications and chief of the Philippine National Police.

Senate of the Philippines
Preceded by Renato Bantug Jr.	Secretary; 2026	Succeeded by Jose Luis Montales
House of Representatives of the Philippines
Preceded by Oscar L. Gozos	Representative, 4th District of Batangas; 2007–2016	Succeeded by Lianda Bolilia
Preceded by Jocelia Bighani Sipin	Secretary General; 2020–2022	Succeeded by Reginald S. Velasco
Political offices
Preceded by Irene Afortunado (OIC)	Presidential Adviser on Legislative Affairs & Head of Presidential Legislative Liaison Office; 2022–2025	Office abolished
