= Renato Bantug Jr. =

Secretary of the Senate of the Philippines (2022-2026; since 2026)

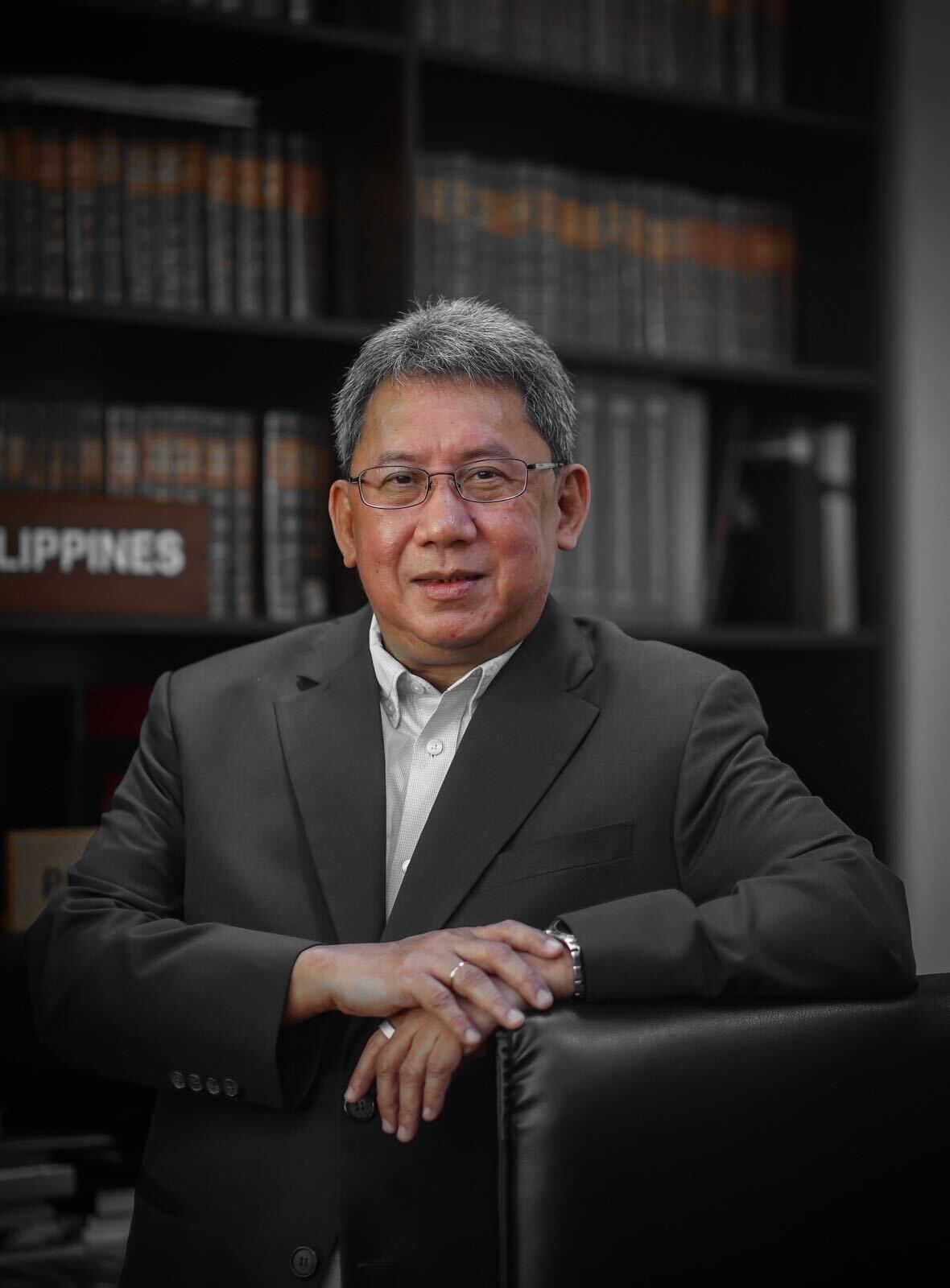
- Official portrait, 2026

22nd and 25th Secretary of the Senate of the Philippines
- Incumbent
- Assumed office June 3, 2026
- Preceded by: Jose Luis Montales
- In office July 25, 2022 – February 2, 2026
- Preceded by: Myra Marie Villarica
- Succeeded by: Mark Llandro Mendoza

Personal details
- Born: Pasay City, Philippines
- Education: Colegio de San Juan de Letran (BA); Ateneo de Manila University; Lyceum of the Philippines University (JD)
- Profession: Lawyer

Renato N. Bantug Jr. is a Filipino lawyer and government official who serves as the Secretary of the Senate of the Philippines since June 3, 2026, a position he previously held in the 19th and 20th Congresses from July 25, 2022, until February 2, 2026.

As Secretary, he also serves concurrently as Clerk of Court in the impeachment trial of Vice President Sara Duterte’s second impeachment.

== Early life and education ==
Bantug was born in Pasay City, Philippines. He earned a Bachelor of Arts degree in Economics from Colegio de San Juan de Letran in 1987, and Juris Doctor degrees from the Ateneo De Manila School of Law in 1991 and the Lyceum of the Philippines College of Law in 1994, respectively.

== Career ==
Prior to his election as Secretary of the Senate, Bantug served for 27 years in various capacities, including Executive Director for Legislation, Acting Senate Legal Counsel, and Chief of Staff to the Office of the Senate President under Franklin Drilon.

On January 28, 2026, Juan Miguel Zubiri introduced Senate Resolution No. 262 for his dedicated service, expressing the highest commendation and gratitude to retiring to the upper chamber. Bantug retired from the Senate on February 2, 2026, as was succeeded by Mark Llandro Mendoza. He was re-elected as Senate secretary on June 3, 2026, following a reorganization of the Senate that declared all elective offices vacant.

Senate of the Philippines
Preceded by Jose Luis Montales	Secretary; June 3, 2026 – present (July 25, 2022 – February 2, 2026)	Incumbent
Preceded by Myra Marie Villarica	Secretary; June 3, 2026 – present (July 25, 2022 – February 2, 2026)	Succeeded by Mark Llandro Mendoza
