= 2013 Batangas local elections =

Philippine election

2013 Batangas gubernatorial election
- May 13, 2013
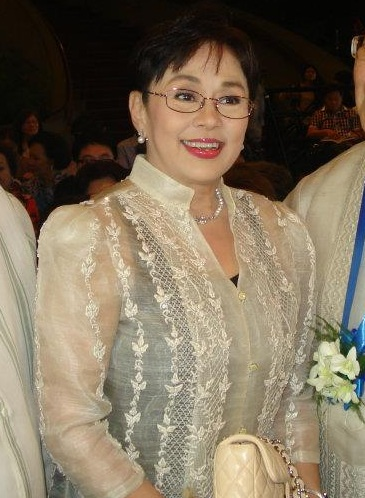
Nominee	Vilma Santos-Recto
Party	Liberal
Running mate	Jose Antonio Leviste II
Popular vote	759,237
Percentage	93.47
Governor before election
Vilma Santos-Recto
Liberal
Elected Governor
Vilma Santos-Recto
Liberal

Local elections were held in the province of Batangas on May 13, 2013 as part of the 2013 general election. Voters will select candidates for all local positions: a town mayor, vice mayor and town councilors, as well as members of the Sangguniang Panlalawigan, the vice-governor, governor and representatives for the four districts of Batangas.

== Provincial elections ==
The candidates for governor and vice governor with the highest number of votes wins the seat; they are voted separately, therefore, they may be of different parties when elected.

=== Gubernatorial election ===
Parties are as stated in their certificate of candidacies.

Vilma Santos Recto is the incumbent.

Batangas gubernatorial election
Party	Candidate	Votes	%
Liberal	Vilma Santos-Recto	759,237	93.47
Independent	Marcos Mandanas, Sr.	48,143	5.93
PMP	Praxedes Bustamante	4,859	0.60
Total votes		975,723	100.00
Liberal hold			

=== Vice-gubernatorial election ===
Parties are as stated in their certificate of candidacies.

Batangas vice-gubernatorial election
Party	Candidate	Votes	%
Liberal	Jose Antonio Leviste II	685,953	89.10
PMP	Rommel Arguelles	83,912	10.90
Total votes		975,723	100.00
Liberal hold			

== Congressional elections ==
Each of Batangas's four legislative districts will elect each representative to the House of Representatives.

=== 1st District ===
Tomas Apacible is the incumbent. He will be facing off against Reynaldo Albajera, former representative Eileen Ermita-Buhain and Dr. Luisito L. Ruiz.

Philippine House of Representatives election at Batangas' 1st district
Party	Candidate	Votes	%
Lakas	Eileen Ermita-Buhain	103,571	50.30
Liberal	Tomas Apacible	98,252	47.72
UNA	Luisito L. Ruiz MD.	2,640	1.28
UNA	Reynaldo Albajera	1,444	0.70
Valid ballots		205,907	90.67
Invalid or blank votes		21,178	9.32
Total votes		227,085	100.00
Lakas gain from Liberal			

=== 2nd District ===
Incumbent Hermilando Mandanas, who had earlier resigned from the Liberal Party is term limited. The Liberals nominated actor and incumbent board member Christopher de Leon, with the United Nationalist Alliance nominating former Board Member Godofredo Berberabe. Berberabe died on March 4, 2013; he was substituted by his brother, Danilo Berberabe.

Philippine House of Representatives election at Batangas' 2nd district
Party	Candidate	Votes	%
Nacionalista	Raneo Abu	94,531	42.55
UNA	Danilo Berberabe	93,426	42.05
Liberal	Christopher de Leon	34,218	15.40
Valid ballots		222,175	93.67
Invalid or blank votes		15,003	6.33
Total votes		237,178	100.00
Nacionalista gain from Liberal			

=== 3rd District ===
Sonny Collantes is the incumbent. He will be facing-off against former congresswoman Victoria Hernandez-Reyes, Tanauan City Mayor Sonia Aquino and Nicomedes Hernandez.

Philippine House of Representatives election at Batangas' 3rd district
Party	Candidate	Votes	%
Liberal	Nelson Collantes	104,276	48.47
Lakas	Sonia Aquino	80,459	37.40
Nacionalista	Victoria Hernandez-Reyes	23,473	10.91
UNA	Nicomedes Hernandez	6,912	3.21
Valid ballots		215,120	92.87
Invalid or blank votes		16,516	7.13
Total votes		231,636	100.00
Liberal hold			

=== 4th District ===
Mark L. Mendoza is the incumbent. He will be facing off against Bernadette Sabili, wife of Lipa City Mayor Meynardo Sabili (Liberal), running as independent

Philippine House of Representatives election at Batangas' 4th district
Party	Candidate	Votes	%
NPC	Mark L. Mendoza	161,131	60.90
UNA	Bernadette Sabili	103,446	39.10
Valid ballots		264,577	94.55
Invalid or blank votes		15,247	5.45
Total votes		279,824	100.00
NPC hold			

== Sangguniang Panlalawigan elections ==
All 4 Districts of Batangas will elect Sangguniang Panlalawigan or provincial board members.

=== 1st District ===
- Municipality: Balayan, Calaca, Calatagan, Lemery, Lian, Nasugbu, Taal, Tuy
- Population (2007): 522,607

Parties are as stated in their certificate of candidacies.

Batangas 1st District Sangguniang Panlalawigan election
Party	Candidate	Votes	%
Liberal	Roman Rosales	94,609	37.46
Liberal	Ramon Bausas	82,935	32.84
UNA	Dennis Apacible	74,983	29.69
Total votes		227,085	100.00

=== 2nd District ===
- City: Batangas City
- Municipality: Bauan, Lobo, Mabini, San Luis, San Pascual, Tuy
- Population (2007): 558,882

Parties are as stated in their certificate of candidacies.

Batangas 2nd District Sangguniang Panlalawigan election
Party	Candidate	Votes	%
Liberal	Dexter Buted	116,793	24.87
NPC	Marvey Mariño	112,178	23.89
Liberal	Amy Alvarez	75,618	16.10
UNA	Serging Atienza	58,897	12.54
Lakas	Joko Diaz	45,814	9.76
UNA	Romeo Sulit	42,358	9.02
Lakas	Jake Garcia	17,932	3.82
Total votes		237,178	100.00

=== 3rd District ===
- City: Tanauan City
- Municipality: Agoncillo, Alitagtag, Balete, Cuenca, Laurel, Malvar, Mataas na Kahoy, San Nicolas, Santa Teresita, Santo Tomas, Talisay
- Population (2007): 537,399

Parties are as stated in their certificate of candidacies

Batangas 3rd District Sangguniang Panlalawigan election
Party	Candidate	Votes	%
Liberal	Alfredo Corona	123,456	55.51
Liberal	Divina Balba	98,935	44.49
Total votes		231,636	100.00

=== 4th District ===
- City: Lipa City
- Municipality: Ibaan, Padre Garcia, Rosario, San Jose, San Juan, Taysan
- Population (2007): 626,981

Parties are as stated in their certificate of candidacies

Batangas 4th District Sangguniang Panlalawigan election
Party	Candidate	Votes	%
Liberal	Rowena Africa	139,774	25.30
Liberal	Caloy Bolilia	133,996	24.26
Liberal	Mabelle Virtusio	133,299	24.13
UNA	Oscar Gozos II	98,286	17.79
UNA	Dy Pang Lim	47,058	8.52
Total votes		279,824	100.00

== City and municipal elections ==
All municipalities of Batangas, Batangas City, Lipa City and Tanauan City will elect mayor and vice-mayor this election. The candidates for mayor and vice mayor with the highest number of votes wins the seat; they are voted separately, therefore, they may be of different parties when elected. Below is the list of mayoralty and vice-mayoralty candidates of each city and municipalities per district

=== 1st District ===
- Municipality: Balayan, Calaca, Calatagan, Lemery, Lian, Nasugbu, Taal, Tuy

==== Balayan ====
Incumbent Mayor Emmanuel Fronda is running for reelection and incumbent Vice Mayor Romel Castelo is not running for re-election.

Balayan mayoralty election
Party	Candidate	Votes	%
Lakas	Manny Fronda	15,723	48.01
Liberal	Marlon Martinez	13,878	42.37
UNA	Peter Malabanan	3,151	9.62
Total votes		34,086	100.00
Lakas hold			

Balayan vice mayoralty election
Party	Candidate	Votes	%
Independent	Joel Arada	14,365	45.18
Liberal	Efren Chavez	9,806	30.84
Lakas	Dennish Afable	7,627	23.99
Total votes		34,086	100.00
Independent gain from Lakas			

==== Calaca ====
Incumbent Mayor Sofronio Ona, Jr. and vice mayor Larry Atienza are term limited. Atienza is running for mayor.

Calaca mayoralty election
Party	Candidate	Votes	%
Lakas	Sofronio Manuel Ona	14,328	48.39
NUP	Elmie Macalindong	7,787	26.30
Liberal	Larry Atienza	7,495	25.31
Total votes		30,282	100.00
Lakas hold			

Calaca vice mayoralty election
Party	Candidate	Votes	%
Lakas	Rante Macalindong	12,235	43.35
Liberal	Emma Dajoyag	9,179	32.52
NUP	Ranie Hernandez	6,811	24.13
Total votes		30,282	100.00
Lakas gain from Liberal			

==== Calatagan ====
Incumbent Mayor Sophia Palacio is running for reelection. Incumbent Vice Mayor Lenie Pantoja is running for mayor. All women will be eyeing the mayoral seat.

Calatagan mayoralty elections
Party	Candidate	Votes	%
Liberal	Sophia Palacio	11,825	55.34
Lakas	Lenie Pantoja	9,209	43.10
UNA	Edna Pedraza	332	1.55
Total votes		22,309	100.00
Liberal hold			

Calatagan vice mayoralty elections
Party	Candidate	Votes	%
Liberal	Glenn Aytona	10,000	49.62
Lakas	Michael Anzaldo	8,967	44.50
UNA	Tet Caisip	1,185	5.88
Total votes		22,309	100.00
Liberal hold			

==== Lemery ====
Incumbent mayor Eulalio Alilio is considered term limited because his first term started in 2006 after winning his electoral protest. Incumbent Vice Mayor Honorlito Solis is running for reelection.

Lemery mayoralty election
Party	Candidate	Votes	%
Liberal	Cherry Alilio	18,673	56.41
UNA	Raul Bendaña	10,889	32.90
Lakas	EJ De Castro	3,539	10.69
Total votes		34,124	100.00
Liberal hold			

Lemery vice mayoralty election
Party	Candidate	Votes	%
Liberal	Honorlito Solis	18,354	57.16
UNA	Geraldine Ornales	13,757	42.84
Total votes		34,124	100.00
Liberal hold			

==== Lian ====
Incumbent mayor Osita Vergara is term limited. Incumbent vice mayor Benito Magbago is running for reelection.

Lian mayoralty election
Party	Candidate	Votes	%
UNA	Isagani Bolompo	8,551	40.29
Liberal	Suzzet Vergara	6,679	31.47
Lakas	Gerardo Manalo	5,993	28.24
Total votes		21,837	100.00
UNA gain from Liberal			

Lian vice mayoralty election
Party	Candidate	Votes	%
Liberal	Raul Lagrisola	7,040	35.42
UNA	Lauro Butiong	6,589	33.15
Lakas	Benito Magbago	6,245	31.42
Total votes		21,837	100.00
Liberal gain from Lakas			

==== Nasugbu ====
Incumbent mayor Antonio Jose Barcelon is term limited.

Nasugbu mayoralty election
Party	Candidate	Votes	%
Liberal	Rosario Apacible	15,947	37.39
Lakas	Jehiel Barcelon	14,137	33.14
PMP	Apolo Villafania	5,171	12.12
NPC	Lerma Kid Limboc	4,238	9.94
LM	Mar Malabanan	2,649	6.21
UNA	Juner Villamin	510	1.20
Total votes		45,139	100.00
Liberal gain from Lakas			

Incumbent vice mayor Apolo Villafania is term limited and is running for Mayor.

Nasugbu vice mayoralty election
Party	Candidate	Votes	%
Lakas	Larry Albanio	15,839	40.34
Liberal	Jimmy Bautista	13,297	33.86
UNA	Ruperto Bragado	8,888	22.64
NPC	Lando Riñoza	1,242	3.16
Total votes		45,139	100.00
Lakas hold			

==== Taal ====
Incumbent mayor Michael Montenegro and vice mayor Fulgencio Mercado is running for reelection

Taal mayoralty election
Party	Candidate	Votes	%
Liberal	Michael D. Montenegro	15,878	72.94
Lakas	Lino Montenegro	5,891	27.06
Total votes		22,518	100.00
Liberal hold			

Taal vice mayoralty election
Party	Candidate	Votes	%
Liberal	Fulgencio Mercado	12,423	58.97
Lakas	Erwin Reyes, Jr.	8,017	38.05
Nacionalista	Horace Afable	628	2.98
Total votes		22,518	100.00
Liberal hold			

==== Tuy ====
Incumbent Mayor Jose Jecerell Cerrado is running for reelection. Incumbent vice mayor Emmanuel Calingasan is not running

Tuy mayoralty elections
Party	Candidate	Votes	%
Liberal	Jose Jecerell Cerrado	10,200	62.46
UNA	Jose Calingasan	6,130	37.54
Total votes		16,790	100.00
Liberal hold			

Tuy vice mayoralty elections
Party	Candidate	Votes	%
Lakas	Teloy Rodriguez	7,878	50.25
Liberal	Atong Mendoza	4,772	30.44
UNA	Ireno Panaligan	3,029	19.32
Total votes		16,790	100.00
Lakas gain from Liberal			

=== 2nd District ===
- City: Batangas City
- Municipality: Bauan, Lobo, Mabini, San Luis, San Pascual, Tingloy

==== Batangas City ====
Incumbent Mayor Vilma Dimacuha is not running for reelection. Her husband, Eduardo Dimacuha is running for Mayor.

Batangas City mayoral election
Party	Candidate	Votes	%
NPC	Eduardo Dimacuha	83,343	77.14
Liberal	Jose Virgilio Tolentino	33,815	28.86
Total votes		122,252	100.00
NPC hold			

Batangas City vice mayoral Election
Party	Candidate	Votes	%
UNA	Emilio Berberabe, Jr.	68,692	58.40
NPC	Eloisa Portugal	24,476	20.81
Liberal	Arthur Blanco	24,446	20.78
Total votes		122,252	100.00
UNA gain from NPC			

==== Bauan ====
Bauan mayoralty election
Party	Candidate	Votes	%
Liberal	Ryanh Dolor	17,399	51.00
Nacionalista	Juan Magboo	16,717	49.00
Total votes		34,906	100.00
Liberal hold			

Bauan mayoralty election
Party	Candidate	Votes	%
Liberal	Julian Casapao	16,226	50.25
Nacionalista	Guding Masangcay	16,066	49.75
Total votes		34,906	100.00
Liberal hold			

==== Lobo ====
Lobo mayoralty election
Party	Candidate	Votes	%
Nacionalista	Jurly Manalo	8,971	51.81
Liberal	Efren Diona	8,345	48.19
Total votes		17,524	100.00
Nacionalista gain from Liberal			

Lobo vice mayoralty election
Party	Candidate	Votes	%
Liberal	Renato Perez	8,797	100.00
Total votes		17,524	100.00
Liberal hold			

==== Mabini ====
Mabini mayoralty election
Party	Candidate	Votes	%
Liberal	Nilo Villanueva	12,299	73.07
Lakas	Esperanza Balita	4,532	26.93
Total votes		17,412	100.00
Liberal hold			

Mabini vice mayoralty election
Party	Candidate	Votes	%
Liberal	Elmar Panopio	9,623	57.13
Lakas	Leonido Bantugon	7,221	42.87
Total votes		17,412	100.00
Liberal hold			

==== San Luis ====
San Luis mayoralty election
Party	Candidate	Votes	%
NPC	Roberto Diokno	8,389	52.85
Liberal	Loreto Huerto	7,483	47.15
Total votes		16,195	100.00
NPC hold			

San Luis vice mayoralty election
Party	Candidate	Votes	%
Liberal	Samuel Noel Ocampo	7,853	50.15
NPC	Rodolfo Mendoza	7,806	49.85
Total votes		16,195	100.00
Liberal gain from NPC			

==== San Pascual ====
Incumbent Mayor Antonio "Tony" Dimayuga is term-limited.

San Pascual mayoralty election
Party	Candidate	Votes	%
Liberal	Antonio Dimayuga	13,854	54.79
Nacionalista	Rosario Anna Conti	11,263	44.54
NPC	Brenda Dimayuga	170	0.67
Total votes		25,891	100.00
Liberal hold			

San Pascual vice mayoralty election
Party	Candidate	Votes	%
Liberal	Davis Gregory Fider	8,439	34.52
NPC	Willy Dimatatac	8,270	33.83
Nacionalista	Librado Dimaunahan	6,612	27.05
Lakas	Marlon Magsaysay	1,124	4.60
Total votes		25,891	100.00
Liberal hold			

==== Tingloy ====
Tingloy mayoralty election
Party	Candidate	Votes	%
Liberal	Lauro Alvarez	2,367	100.00
Total votes		2,998	100.00
Liberal hold			

Tingloy vice mayoralty election
Party	Candidate	Votes	%
Liberal	Danilo Datingaling	2,225	100.00
Total votes		2,998	100.00
Liberal hold			

=== 3rd District ===
- City: Tanauan City
- Municipality: Agoncillo, Alitagtag, Balete, Cuenca, Laurel, Malvar, Mataas na Kahoy, Batangas, San Nicolas, Santa Teresita, Santo Tomas, Talisay

==== Tanauan City ====
Tanauan City mayoralty election
Party	Candidate	Votes	%
NPC	Antonio Halili	33,942	59.79
Liberal	Julius Caesar Platon II	22,829	40.21
Total votes		58,119	100.00
NPC gain from Liberal			

Tanauan City vice mayoralty election
Party	Candidate	Votes	%
Liberal	Jhoanna Corona	31,514	56.95
NPC	Pol Mark Fajardo	23,825	43.05
Total votes		58,119	100.00
Liberal hold			

==== Agoncillo ====
Agoncillo mayoralty election
Party	Candidate	Votes	%
Liberal	Daniel Reyes	8,151	54.19
UNA	Luisito De Leon	6,890	45.81
Total votes		15,256	100.00
Liberal hold			

Agoncillo vice mayoralty election
Party	Candidate	Votes	%
Liberal	Domingo Encarnacion	7,570	51.59
UNA	Anna Queen Martinez	7,102	48.41
Total votes		15,256	100.00
Liberal hold			

==== Alitagtag ====
Alitagtag mayoralty election
Party	Candidate	Votes	%
Liberal	Anthony Francis Andal	4,891	47.35
NPC	Guillermo Reyes	4,727	45.76
PMP	Henry Hernandez	712	6.89
Total votes		10,644	100.00
Liberal hold			

Alitagtag vice mayoralty election
Party	Candidate	Votes	%
NPC	Donald Marasigan	5,497	55.67
Liberal	Ante Palines	4,377	44.33
Total votes		10,644	100.00
NPC hold			

==== Balete ====
Balete mayoralty election
Party	Candidate	Votes	%
Liberal	Leovino Hidalgo	3,488	100.00
Total votes		5,409	100.00
Liberal hold			

Balete vice mayoralty election
Party	Candidate	Votes	%
Liberal	Wilson Maralit	3,492	100.00
Total votes		5,409	100.00
Liberal hold			

==== Cuenca ====
Cuenca mayoralty election
Party	Candidate	Votes	%
Liberal	Celerino Endaya	7,629	53.85
UNA	Edmundo Remo	6,538	46.15
Total votes		14,478	100.00
Liberal gain from UNA			

Cuenca mayoralty election
Party	Candidate	Votes	%
Nacionalista	Rolando La Rosa	6,051	44.11
PMP	Lordito Hoseña	5,134	37.43
Liberal	Lucina Cuevas	2,532	18.46
Total votes		14,478	100.00
Nacionalista gain from Liberal			

==== Laurel ====
Incumbent Mayor Randy James Amo is running for reelection. He will be facing off against former Mayor Natalio Panganiban, while vice mayor Florencio Villanueva is running for reelection.

Laurel mayoralty election
Party	Candidate	Votes	%
Liberal	Randy James Amo	10,529	61.62
UNA	Natalio Panganiban	6,559	38.38
Total votes		17,479	100.00
Liberal hold			

Laurel Vice Mayoralty election
Party	Candidate	Votes	%
Liberal	Felimon Austria	10,115	61.21
UNA	Florencio Villanueva	6,410	38.79
Total votes		17,479	100.00
Liberal gain from UNA			

==== Malvar ====
Malvar mayoralty election
Party	Candidate	Votes	%
Liberal	Carlito Reyes	13,433	100.00
Total votes		16,112	100.00
Liberal hold			

Malvar vice mayoralty election
Party	Candidate	Votes	%
Liberal	Cristeta Reyes	13,224	100.00
Total votes		16,112	100.00
Liberal hold			

==== Mataas na Kahoy ====
Mataas na Kahoy mayoralty election
Party	Candidate	Votes	%
Liberal	Jay Ilagan	7,164	51.75
UNA	Calixto Luna, Jr.	6,679	48.25
Total votes		14,106	100.00
Liberal hold			

Mataas na Kahoy mayoralty election
Party	Candidate	Votes	%
UNA	Henry Laqui	6,956	51.89
Liberal	Dennis Sombrano	6,448	48.11
Total votes		14,106	100.00
UNA gain from Liberal			

==== San Nicolas ====
San Nicolas mayoralty election
Party	Candidate	Votes	%
Liberal	Epifanio Sandoval	5,356	49.30
Lakas	Ireneo Hernandez	5,195	47.82
UNA	Regidor Caringal	313	2.88
Total votes		11,130	100.00
Liberal hold			

San Nicolas vice mayoralty election
Party	Candidate	Votes	%
Lakas	Alex Biscocho	5,449	52.20
Liberal	Leonardo Alvaira	4,989	47.80
Total votes		11,130	100.00
Lakas gain from Liberal			

==== Santa Teresita ====
Santa Teresita mayoralty election
Party	Candidate	Votes	%
Liberal	Ma. Aurea Segunial	3,124	63.91
PMP	Anna Marie Mendoza	1,764	36.09
Total votes		5,008	100.00
Liberal hold			

Santa Teresita vice mayoralty election
Party	Candidate	Votes	%
Liberal	Carlos Bathan	3,380	75.13
PMP	Antonio Salazar	1,119	24.87
Total votes		5,008	100.00
Liberal hold			

==== Santo Tomas ====
Santo Tomas mayoralty election
Party	Candidate	Votes	%
UNA	Edna Sanchez	16,263	31.94
Nacionalista	Renato Federico	14,814	29.09
Liberal	Osmundo Maligaya	13,315	
Lakas	Armenius Silva	6,196	12.17
NPC	Noel Ascaño	330	0.65
Total votes		52,738	100.00
UNA gain from Nacionalista			

Santo Tomas vice mayoralty election
Party	Candidate	Votes	%
UNA	Ferdinand Ramos	16,378	33.52
Liberal	Damasino Mabilangan, Jr.	12,415	25.41
Lakas	Gerardo Malijan	11,061	22.64
Nacionalista	Ford Jaurigue	9,012	18.44
Total votes		52,738	100.00
Nacionalista gain from UNA			

==== Talisay ====
Talisay mayoralty election
Party	Candidate	Votes	%
PMP	Gerry Natanauan	5,718	51.93
Liberal	Zenaida Mendoza	5,292	48.07
Total votes		11,157	100.00
PMP gain from Liberal			

Talisay vice mayoralty election
Party	Candidate	Votes	%
Liberal	Geraldine Agno	5,718	53.96
PMP	Allan Lamano	4,878	46.04
Total votes		11,157	100.00
Liberal gain from PMP			

=== 4th District ===
- City: Lipa City
- Municipality: Ibaan, Padre Garcia, Rosario, San Jose, San Juan, Taysan

==== Lipa City ====
Lipa City mayoral election
Party	Candidate	Votes	%
Liberal	Meynardo Sabili	50,140	54.27
UNA	Lydio Lopez, Jr.	38,519	41.69
PMP	Merlo Silva	2,996	3.24
Lakas	Lyn Dimaano	590	0.64
Nacionalista	Roy Sanggalang	152	0.16
Total votes		95,136	100.00
Liberal hold			

Lipa City Vice Mayoral Election
Party	Candidate	Votes	%
Liberal	Eric Africa	38,280	42.65
NPC	Ralph Peter Umali	20,865	23.25
UNA	Marlon Luancing	14,969	16.68
PMP	Avior Rocafort	10,106	11.26
Nacionalista	Mario Panganiban	5,534	6.17
Total votes		95,136	100.00
Liberal gain from UNA			

==== Ibaan ====
Ibaan mayoralty election
Party	Candidate	Votes	%
Liberal	Juan Toreja	13,940	62.12
UNA	Cesar Marasigan	8,502	37.88
Total votes		23,009	100.00
Liberal hold			

Ibaan vice mayoralty election
Party	Candidate	Votes	%
Liberal	Sixto Yabyabin	11,752	53.98
UNA	Mateo Guerra	10,019	46.02
Total votes		23,009	100.00
Liberal hold			

==== Padre Garcia ====
Incumbent Prudencio Gutierrez is term-limited. His brother, Abraham Gutierrez is his party's nominee. His opponent is Celsa Rivera, wife of 1-CARE partylist representative Michael Angelo Rivera.

Padre Garcia mayoralty election
Party	Candidate	Votes	%
NPC	Abraham Gutierrez	10,896	53.72
Liberal	Celsa Rivera	9,387	46.28
Total votes		20,787	100.00
NPC hold			

Incumbent Melvin Vidal who assumed the position after the death of vice mayor Pedro Convento, is running for a full three-year term. His opponents are Noel Cantos, incumbent councilor Artemio Gonzales and Dexter Calizar.

Padre Garcia mayoralty election
Party	Candidate	Votes	%
Liberal	Noel Cantos	6,738	33.92
Nacionalista	Melvin Vidal	6,128	30.85
NPC	Artemio Gonzales	5,026	25.30
Lakas	Dexter Calizar	1,972	9.93
Total votes		20,787	100.00
Liberal gain from Nacionalista			

==== Rosario ====
Incumbent Manuel Alvarez who assumed the position after the death of mayor Felipe Marquez is running for a full three-year term. His opponents are incumbent councilor Leovigildo Morpe and former councilor Jesus De Veyra.

Rosario mayoralty election
Party	Candidate	Votes	%
UNA	Manuel Alvarez	23,529	46.21
Liberal	Leovigildo Morpe	20,262	39.79
PDSP	Jesus De Veyra	7,130	14.00
Total votes		51,912	100.00
UNA hold			

Incumbent Jose Valencia who assumed the position after Manuel Alvarez was elevated to mayor is running for a full three-year term. His opponents are former vice mayor Leonardo Anyayahan, Gaudioso Macatangay, incumbent councilor Teodoro Karr Luansing and former mayor Rodolfo Villar.

Rosario vice mayoralty election
Party	Candidate	Votes	%
PDSP	Jose Valencia	15,867	32.52
UNA	Rodolfo Villar	12,582	25.79
Liberal	Teodoro Karr Luansing	11,329	23.22
PMP	Gaudioso Macatangay	5,844	11.98
Lakas	Leonardo Anyayahan	3,169	6.50
Total votes		51,912	100.00
PDSP hold			

==== San Jose ====
San Jose mayoralty election
Party	Candidate	Votes	%
Liberal	Entiquio Briones	14,640	49.07
Bangon Pilipinas	Jose Nereus Agbing	6,882	23.07
UNA	Godfrey Umali	5,873	19.68
PMP	Melvin Requiño	2,305	7.73
Lakas	Genaro Masilungan, Jr.	137	0.46
Total votes		31,348	100.00
Liberal hold			

San Jose vice mayoralty election
Party	Candidate	Votes	%
NPC	Valentino Patron	19,969	69.94
Bangon Pilipinas	Francisco De Villa	7,528	26.37
PMP	Emma Alday	1,053	3.69
Total votes		31,348	100.00
NPC gain from Bangon Pilipinas			

==== San Juan ====
San Juan mayoral election
Party	Candidate	Votes	%
Liberal	Rodolfo H. Manalo	24,770	59.97
UNA	Danilo S. Mindanao	16,537	40.03
Total votes		43,078	100.00
Liberal hold			

San Juan vice mayoral Election
Party	Candidate	Votes	%
NPC	Octavio Antonio L. Marasigan	33,188	100.00
Total votes		43,078	100.00
NPC hold			

==== Taysan ====
Taysan mayoralty election
Party	Candidate	Votes	%
NPC	Victor Portugal, Jr	10,418	100.00
Total votes		14,554	100.00
NPC hold			

Taysan vice mayoralty election
Party	Candidate	Votes	%
NPC	Grande Gutierrez	10,769	100.00
Total votes		14,554	100.00
NPC hold			
