= Jose Luis Montales =

Secretary of the Senate of the Philippines (May–June 2026)

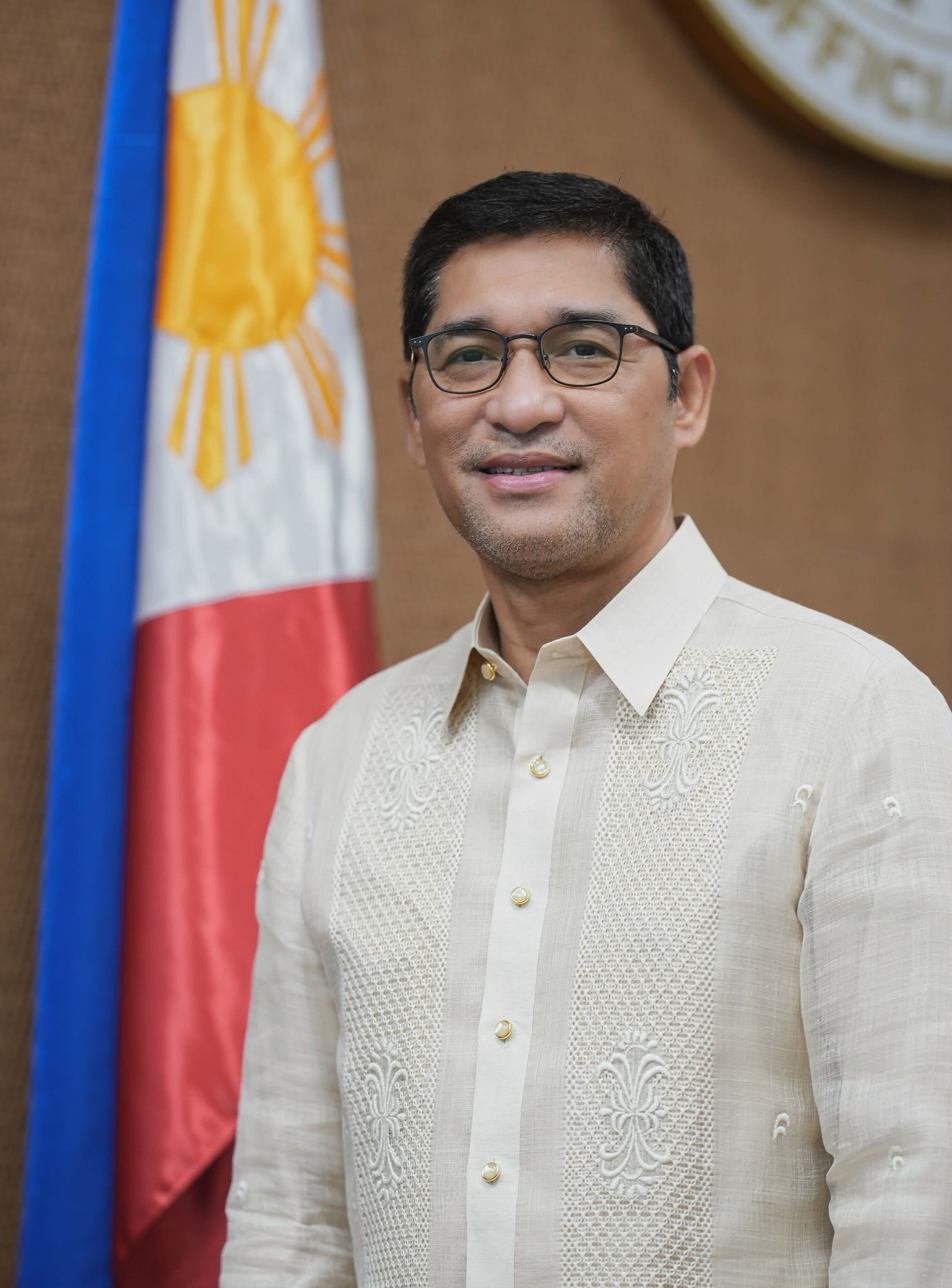
- Official portrait as Senate secretary, 2026

Secretary of the Senate of the Philippines
- In office May 18, 2026 – June 3, 2026
- Preceded by: Mark Llandro Mendoza
- Succeeded by: Renato Bantug Jr.

Secretary General of the House of Representatives of the Philippines
- In office July 22, 2019 – October 12, 2020
- Preceded by: Dante Roberto Maling (acting)
- Succeeded by: Jocelia Bighani Sipin

City Administrator of Taguig
- In office 2022–2026
- Mayor: Lani Cayetano
- Preceded by: Lyle Niño Pasco
- Succeeded by: Cecilia Montales
- In office 2010–2017
- Mayor: Lani Cayetano

Personal details
- Born: August 28, 1968 (age 58) Calapan, Oriental Mindoro, Philippines
- Spouse: Cecilia Montales
- Education: Ateneo de Manila University (AB); University of the Philippines Diliman (LL.B.)
- Occupation: Lawyer

Jose Luis Garcia Montales (born August 28, 1968) is a Filipino lawyer and government official, who briefly served as Secretary of the Senate of the Philippines from May 18 to June 3, 2026, under Alan Peter Cayetano as Senate President.

He had previously served as the Secretary-General of the House of Representatives from 2019 to 2020, under Cayetano's tenure as Speaker, as well as the City Administrator of Taguig from 2010 to 2017 and from 2022 to 2026, during the mayorship of Cayetano's wife Lani.

== Early life and education ==
Montales was born in Calapan, Oriental Mindoro. He graduated with high honors at the Calapan Central School and Oriental Mindoro National High School. He obtained a degree in AB Philosophy from the Ateneo de Manila University in 1989 and pursued graduate studies at the University of the Philippines Diliman, where he earned his Bachelor of Laws degree in 1993. He subsequently passed the 1994 Philippine Bar Examinations.

== Political career ==
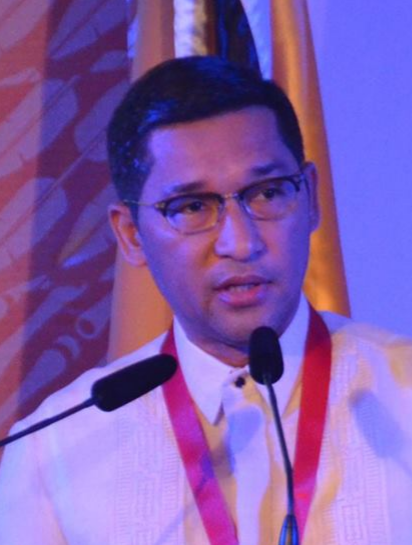
Foreign Affairs Undersecretary Montales in 2017

Montales served as head of the City Administrator's Office of Taguig under the mayoralty of Lani Cayetano from 2010 to 2017. Upon Alan Peter Cayetano's appointment as Secretary of Foreign Affairs, Montales served in the Department of Foreign Affairs as undersecretary for civilian security and consular concerns.

Montales was elected secretary-general of the House of Representatives on July 22, 2019, at the opening of the 18th Congress, following the election of then-Taguig-Pateros 1st District representative Alan Peter Cayetano as speaker. He was succeeded by Jocelia Sipin during a special session convened by allies Marinduque Lone District representative Lord Allan Velasco, who unseated Cayetano as speaker on October 12, 2020.

In 2022, Montales began his second stint as Taguig city administrator under returning Mayor Lani Cayetano. During his term, he saw the transfer of the ten Embo barangays to Taguig in 2023, following the final Supreme Court ruling on the city's boundary dispute with Makati. On March 5, 2024, four Makati City Government employees filed a lawsuit against Montales, Cayetano, and other Taguig officials before the Taguig City Prosecutor's Office for illegal detention following the Makati Park and Garden (now Taguig People's Park) standoff on March 1. The charges were dismissed later that year due to lack of evidence.

Montales was elected Secretary of the Senate on May 18, 2026, a week after Alan Peter Cayetano was elected Senate President following the controversial ouster of Tito Sotto and the return of Senator Ronald dela Rosa, who was the subject of an arrest warrant issued by the International Criminal Court. On June 3, 2026, when the then eleven-member minority bloc, together with Senator Francis Escudero, attended a session prior to the Senate's sine die adjournment, Montales was called upon by presiding officer and Senate President pro tempore Sherwin Gatchalian to conduct the roll call but refused to do so. He was subsequently replaced by former Senate Secretary Renato Bantug Jr.

== Personal life ==
Montales is married to Dr. Cecilia Montales, who succeeded him as city administrator of Taguig in 2026 and is previously the city government's executive assistant for health.

Senate of the Philippines
Preceded by Mark Llandro Mendoza	Secretary; 2026	Succeeded by Renato Bantug Jr.
Government offices
Preceded by Lyle Niño Pasco	City Administrator of Taguig; 2022–2026	Succeeded by Cecilia Montales
House of Representatives of the Philippines
Preceded by Dante Roberto Maling (acting)	Secretary General; 2019–2020	Succeeded by Jocelia Bighani Sipin
