= Secretary of the Senate of the Philippines =

Elected officer of the Senate of the Philippines

- Kalihim ng Senado ng Pilipinas
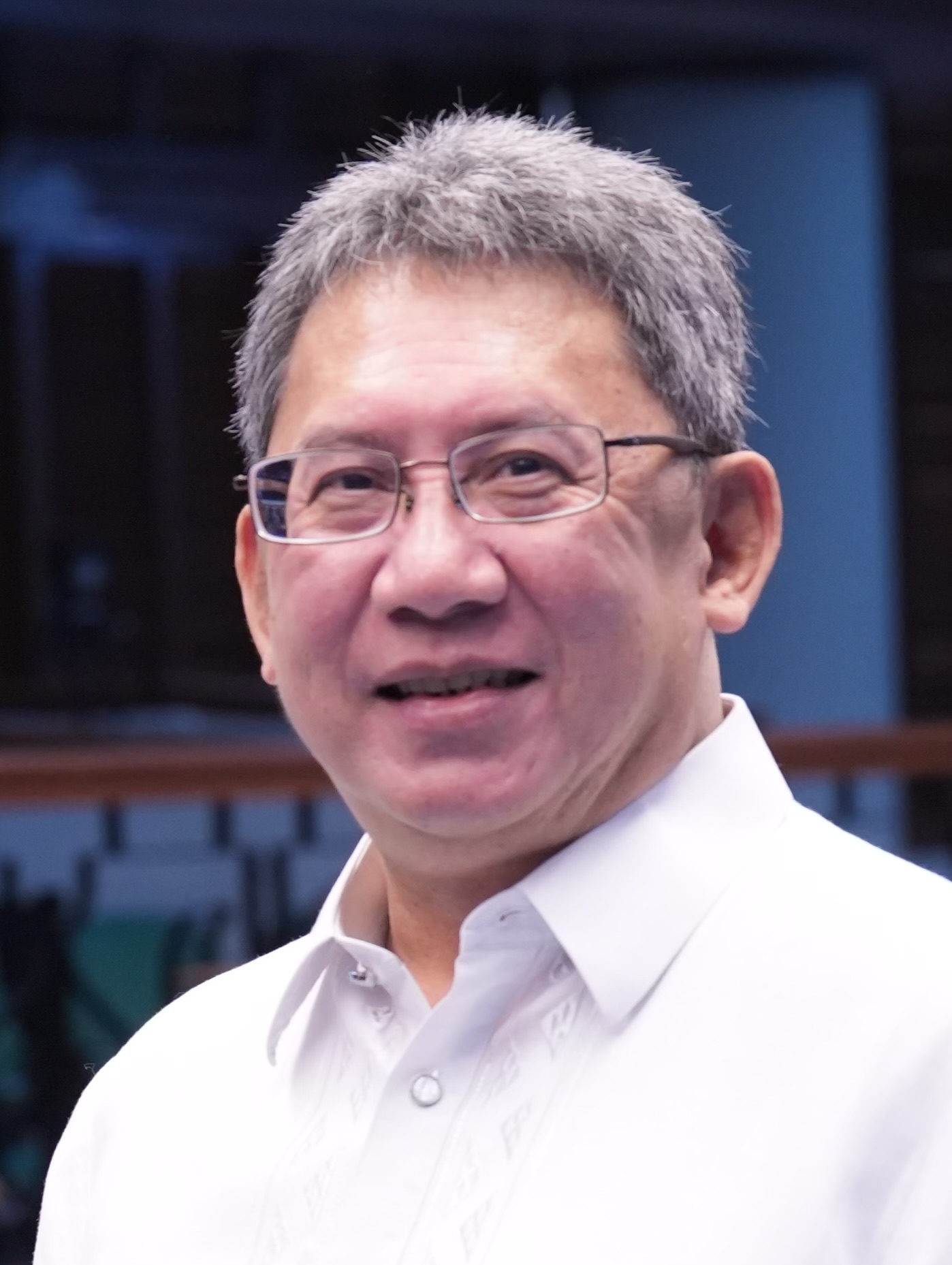
- Incumbent; Renato Bantug Jr. since June 3, 2026
- Senate of the Philippines
- Style: The Honorable
- Seat: GSIS Building, Financial Center, Jose W. Diokno Boulevard, Pasay
- Appointer: Elected by the Senate
- Formation: October 16, 1916
- First holder: Felipe Buencamino Jr.
- Deputy: Deputy Secretaries of the Senate of the Philippines
- Salary: ₱3,341,000 per year (2023)

The secretary of the Senate of the Philippines (Filipino: Kalihim ng Senado ng Pilipinas) is an officer of the Senate of the Philippines. The secretary is an elected official among the staff of the Senate, responsible for helping the Senate president provide efficient legislative and administrative support to the offices of the senators, managing the affairs of the Senate Secretariat, inclusive of all the offices, service units, officers, and employees, acting as its central clearinghouse, and developing strategic plans and policies for the enhancement of the Senate's professionalism.

The first secretary was Felipe Buencamino Jr., serving in the upper chamber of the fourth Philippine Legislature from the Senate's establishment in 1916 until 1917.

The current secretary of the Senate is Renato Bantug Jr., serving since June 3, 2026.

== Powers and duties ==
According to Rule V, Section 7 of the Rules of the Senate, the duties and powers of the Secretary are:

- For the inaugural session of the Congress, to prepare the Order of Business of the Senate which shall include:
  - A Resolution informing the President of the Philippines that the Senate has been organized and has elected its President, President Pro Tempore, Secretary and Sergeant-at-Arms;
  - A Resolution informing the House of Representatives that the Senate has been organized and has elected its President, President Pro Tempore, Secretary and Sergeant-at-Arms;
  - A Concurrent Resolution of the Senate and House of Representatives providing for a joint session to hear the State of the Nation Address of the President of the Philippines;
  - A Concurrent Resolution authorizing the appointment of a joint committee of both Houses to inform the President of the Philippines that Congress, in joint session, is ready to receive his State of the Nation Address;
- To attend the sessions of the Senate;
- To open, whenever there is neither a President nor a President Pro Tempore, the first session in which the Senators elected in the immediately preceding regular elections shall participate, and to announce that the business in order is the designation of the temporary President;
- To keep a Record and Journal of the proceedings of the Senate, and to certify them himself;
- To prepare and distribute the calendars of the Senate;
- To publish and distribute the Journal and Record of the Senate;
- To serve as custodian of all the records of the Senate;
- To certify all measures, orders and resolutions approved by the Senate and to stamp them with its official seal which shall also be under his custody;
- To appoint, whenever expressly authorized by the Senate, the necessary subordinate personnel thereof;
- To be responsible for the strict compliance by the Senate personnel with their duties, upon whom he may impose, for just cause, corrective or disciplinary measures including a recommendation to the President for their dismissal;
- To administer oath as a Notary ex officio of the Senate; and
- To perform other duties inherent in his office although not specified in these Rules.

The Secretary also serves as the official clerk of the impeachment court when the Senate convenes as such.

== Secretaries of the Senate ==
The following persons served as Secretary of the Senate:

Portrait	Name	Term start	Term end	Legislature	Refs.
	Felipe Buencamino Jr.	October 16, 1916	1917	4th Legislature	
	Fernando María Guerrero	1917	1922	4th Legislature	
	Fernando María Guerrero	1917	1922	5th Legislature	
	Faustino Aguilar	1922	1931	6th Legislature	
	Faustino Aguilar	1922	1931	7th Legislature	
	Faustino Aguilar	1922	1931	8th Legislature	
	Fermín Torralba	1931	November 15, 1935	9th Legislature	
	Fermín Torralba	1931	November 15, 1935	10th Legislature	
Senate abolished (1935–1941)
	Felix Lazo	June 9, 1945	1946	1st Commonwealth; Congress	
	Antonio Zacarias	1946	1949	2nd Commonwealth; Congress	
	Antonio Zacarias	1946	1949	1st Congress	
	Toribio Perez	1949	1954	2nd Congress	
	Sofronio Quimson	1954	1958	3rd Congress	
	Fidel Henares	1958	1960	4th Congress	
	Regino Eustaquio	1960	1966	4th Congress	
	Regino Eustaquio	1960	1966	5th Congress	
	Regino Eustaquio	1960	1966	6th Congress	
	Eliseo Tenza	1966	January 17, 1973	6th Congress	
	Eliseo Tenza	1966	January 17, 1973	7th Congress	
Senate abolished (1973–1986)
	Eriberto Bernal	July 27, 1987	1988	8th Congress	
	Edwin Acoba	1988	1991	8th Congress	
	Anacleto Badoy	1991	1992	8th Congress	
	Lorenzo Leynes Jr. Acting	1991	1992	8th Congress	
	Anacleto Badoy	1992	1993	8th Congress	
	Anacleto Badoy	1992	1993	9th Congress	
	Edgardo Tumangan	1993	1995	9th Congress	
	Edgardo Tumangan	1993	1995	10th Congress	
	Hezel Gacutan	1995	1996	10th Congress	
	Lorenzo Leynes Jr.	1996	1998	10th Congress	
	Hezel Gacutan	1998	April 2000	10th Congress	
	Hezel Gacutan	1998	April 2000	11th Congress	
	Oscar Yabes	April 2000	November 2000	11th Congress	
	Lutgardo Barbo	November 2000	July 23, 2001	11th Congress	
	Oscar Yabes	July 23, 2001	July 24, 2007	12th Congress	
	Oscar Yabes	July 23, 2001	July 24, 2007	13th Congress	
	Emma Lirio-Reyes	July 24, 2007	July 22, 2013	14th Congress	
	Emma Lirio-Reyes	July 24, 2007	July 22, 2013	15th Congress	
	Oscar Yabes	July 22, 2013	July 25, 2016	16th Congress	
	Lutgardo Barbo	July 25, 2016	May 29, 2018	17th Congress	
	Myra Marie Villarica	May 29, 2018	July 25, 2022	17th Congress	
	Myra Marie Villarica	May 29, 2018	July 25, 2022	18th Congress	
	Renato Bantug Jr.	July 25, 2022	February 2, 2026	19th Congress	
	Renato Bantug Jr.	July 25, 2022	February 2, 2026	20th Congress	
	Mark Llandro Mendoza	February 2, 2026	May 18, 2026	20th Congress	
	Jose Luis Montales	May 18, 2026	June 3, 2026	20th Congress	
	Renato Bantug Jr.	June 3, 2026	Incumbent	20th Congress	

== See also ==
- Secretary General of the House of Representatives of the Philippines
