= 2019 Batangas local elections =

2019 Batangas gubernatorial election
- May 13, 2019
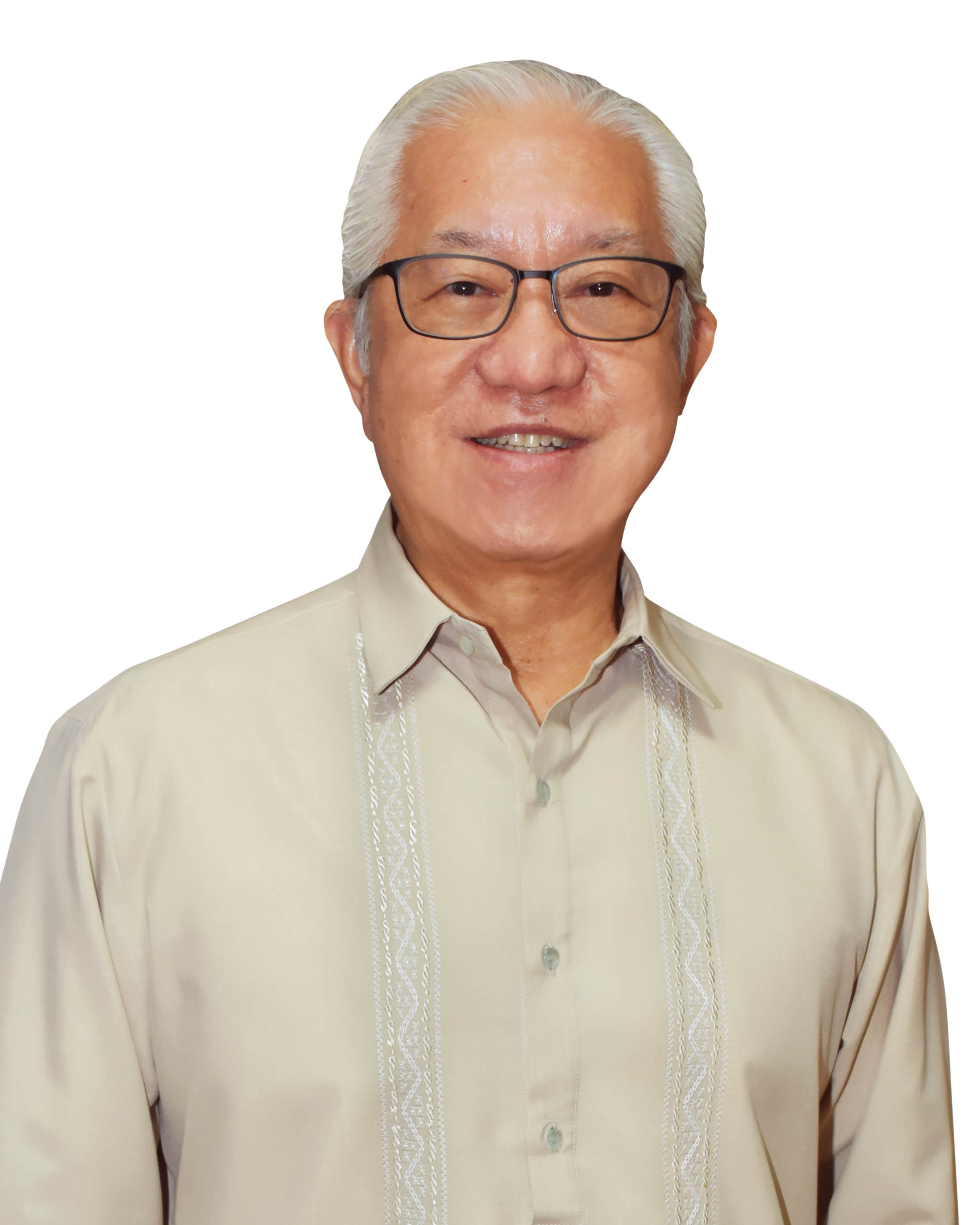
Nominee	Hermilando Mandanas
Party	PDP–Laban
Running mate	Mark Leviste
Popular vote	1,078,447
Percentage	96.57
Governor before election
Hermilando Mandanas
PDP–Laban
Elected Governor
Hermilando Mandanas
PDP–Laban

Batangas held its local elections on May 13, 2019, as part of the 2019 general election. Voters will select candidates for all local positions: a town mayor, vice mayor and town councilors, as well as members of the Sangguniang Panlalawigan, the vice-governor, governor and for the six districts of Batangas.

== Provincial elections ==
=== Governor ===
Incumbent Hermilando Mandanas ran for reelection.

Batangas gubernatorial election
Party	Candidate	Votes	%
PDP–Laban	Hermilando Mandanas	1,078,447	96.57
Independent	Jojo Kabise Gutierrez	28,549	2.55
Independent	Danilo Guste	9,656	0.86
Total votes		1,116,652	100.00
PDP–Laban hold			

=== Vice Governor ===
Incumbent Sofronio Ona Jr. did not run for his second term, he instead ran for Mayor of Calaca, Batangas. Running for the position were Reynan Bool and former Vice Governors Mark Leviste and Richard Recto.

Batangas vice gubernatorial election
Party	Candidate	Votes	%
PDP–Laban	Mark Leviste	819,521	74.13
Independent	Ricky Recto	273,496	24.74
PDDS	Reynan Bool	12,428	1.12
Total votes		1,105,445	100.00
PDP–Laban hold			

=== Congressional Elections ===
==== 1st District ====
Eileen Ermita-Buhain was the incumbent. Her opponent was former congressman Conrado Apacible.

2019 Philippine House of Representatives election in Batangas's 1st District
Party	Candidate	Votes	%
Nacionalista	Eileen Ermita-Buhain	209,091	81.27
PDP–Laban	Conrado Apacible	48,158	18.72
Total votes		257,249	100.00
Nacionalista hold			

==== 2nd District ====
Raneo Abu was the incumbent.

2019 Philippine House of Representatives election in Batangas's 2nd District
Party	Candidate	Votes	%
Nacionalista	Raneo Abu	117,205	88.91
PDP–Laban	Nicasio Conti	14,610	11.08
Total votes		131,815	100.00
Nacionalista hold			

==== 3rd District ====
Incumbent Ma. Theresa Collantes ran for reelection. Her main opponents were Nestor Burgos, former Board Member Ma. Chona Dimayuga and Jose Gabriel Reyes. Collantes and Dimayuga ran under two factions of PDP-Laban. Collantes ran under the Pimentel Wing while Dimayuga was under the Garcia Wing.

2019 Philippine House of Representatives election in Batangas's 3rd District
Party	Candidate	Votes	%
PDP–Laban	Ma. Theresa Collantes	200,450	70.70
Independent	Ma. Chona Dimayuga	63,430	22.37
Independent	Jose Gabriel Reyes	11,541	4.07
LM	Nestor Burgos	8,095	2.85
Total votes		283,516	100.00
PDP–Laban hold			

==== 4th District ====
Lianda Bolilia was the incumbent. Her opponent was former representative Mark Llandro Mendoza.

2019 Philippine House of Representatives election in Batangas's 4th District
Party	Candidate	Votes	%
Nacionalista	Lianda Bolilia	124,036	55.48
NPC	Mark Llandro Mendoza	99,500	44.51
Total votes		223,536	100.00
Nacionalista hold			

==== 5th District (Batangas City) ====
Incumbent Marvey Mariño ran for reelection.

2019 Philippine House of Representatives election in Batangas's 5th District (Lone District of Batangas City)
Party	Candidate	Votes	%
Nacionalista	Marvey Mariño	132,286	100.00
Total votes		132,286	100.00
Nacionalista hold			

==== 6th District (Lipa City) ====
Incumbent Vilma Santos-Recto ran for reelection. Her main opponent was incumbent Lipa Mayor Meynardo Sabili.

2019 Philippine House of Representatives election in Batangas's 6th District (Lone District of Lipa City)
Party	Candidate	Votes	%
Nacionalista	Vilma Santos-Recto	96,743	61.01
NPC	Meynardo Sabili	61,821	38.99
Total votes		158,564	100.00
Nacionalista hold			

=== Provincial Board Members ===
Party	Popular vote		Seats	
Party	Total	%	Total	%
Nacionalista	1,257,103	72.19%	12	80%
PDP–Laban	256,269	14.72%	0	0%
NPC	171,381	9.84%	0	0%
Independent	56,722	3.26%	0	0%
Total	1,741,475	100%	12	80%

==== 1st District ====
2019 Provincial Board Election in 1st District of Batangas
Party	Candidate	Votes	%
Nacionalista	Carlo Roman Rosales	146,558	44.33
Nacionalista	Glenda Bausas	100,184	30.30
PDP–Laban	Consuelo Malabanan	83,855	25.36
Total votes		330,597	100.00

==== 2nd District ====
2019 Provincial Board Election in 2nd District of Batangas
Party	Candidate	Votes	%
Nacionalista	Arlina Magboo	89,183	46.04
Nacionalista	Wilson Leonardo Rivera	67,411	34.80
Independent	Herminio Dolor	37,084	19.14
Total votes		193,678	100.00

==== 3rd District ====
2019 Provincial Board Election in 3rd District of Batangas
Party	Candidate	Votes	%
Nacionalista	Jhoanna Corona-Villamor	141,559	30.72
Nacionalista	Rodolfo Balba	111,729	24.25
PDP–Laban	Randy James Amo	87,480	18.98
PDP–Laban	Peter Thomas Reyes	84,934	18.43
NPC	Balbino Pariño	28,321	6.14
Independent	Randy Peter Aragon	6,711	1.45
Total votes		460,734	100.00

==== 4th District ====
2019 Provincial Board Election in 4th District of Batangas
Party	Candidate	Votes	%
Nacionalista	Jonas Patrick Gozos	116,767	39.31
Nacionalista	Jesus De Veyra	98,294	33.09
NPC	Mabelle Virtusio	81,930	27.58
Total votes		296,991	100.00

==== 5th District ====
2019 Provincial Board Election in 5th District of Batangas
Party	Candidate	Votes	%
Nacionalista	Maria Claudette Ambida	113,547	49.46
Nacionalista	Arthur Blanco	103,096	44.90
Independent	Edwin Sulit	12,927	5.63
Total votes		229,570	100.00

==== 6th District ====
2019 Provincial Board Election in 6th District of Batangas
Party	Candidate	Votes	%
Nacionalista	Lydio Lopez, Jr.	95,128	41.37
Nacionalista	Aries Emmanuel Mendoza	73,647	32.03
NPC	Federico Caisip	61,130	26.58
Total votes		229,905	100.00

== City and municipal elections ==
All municipalities of Batangas, Batangas City, Lipa City and Tanauan City will elect mayor and vice-mayor this election. The candidates for mayor and vice mayor with the highest number of votes wins the seat; they are voted separately, therefore, they may be of different parties when elected. Below is the list of mayoralty and vice-mayoralty candidates of each city and municipalities per district

=== 1st District ===
- Municipality: Balayan, Calaca, Calatagan, Lemery, Lian, Nasugbu, Taal, Tuy

==== Balayan ====
Incumbent Emmanuel Salvador Fronda II is running for reelection. His opponent is incumbent Vice Mayor Joel Arada. Aranda would later withdrew his candidacy and was substituted by Nilo Pamintuan.

Balayan mayoralty elections
Party	Candidate	Votes	%
Nacionalista	Emmanuel Salvador Fronda II	29,649	71.59
PDP–Laban	Nilo Pamintuan	11,762	28.40
Margin of victory		17,887	41.60%
Valid ballots		41,411	96.31%
Invalid or blank votes		1,586	3.69%
Total votes		42,997	100%
Nacionalista hold			

Incumbent Joel Arada is running for mayor. His party nominated Francisco Ramos. His opponent is Rita Abiad.

Balayan vice mayoralty elections
Party	Candidate	Votes	%
PDP–Laban	Francisco Ramos	20,434	50.43
Nacionalista	Rita Abiad	20,078	49.56
Margin of victory		356	0.83%
Valid ballots		40,512	94.22%
Invalid or blank votes		2,485	5.78%
Total votes		42,997	100%
PDP–Laban hold			

==== Calaca ====
Incumbent Sofronio Manuel Ona is not running. His brother, incumbent Vice Governor Sofronio Ona Jr. is his party's nominee.

Calaca mayoralty elections
Party	Candidate	Votes	%
Nacionalista	Sofronio "Nas" Ona	34,166	86.89
Independent	Roberto Landicho	5,154	13.10
Margin of victory		29,012	73.78%
Valid ballots		39,320	94.18%
Invalid or blank votes		2,430	5.82%
Total votes		41,750	100%
Nacionalista hold			

Incumbent Renante Macalindong is running for reelection unopposed.

Calaca vice mayoralty elections
Party	Candidate	Votes	%
Nacionalista	Renante Macalindong	32,783	100.00
Invalid or blank votes		8,967	21.48%
Total votes		41,750	100.00
Nacionalista hold			

==== Calatagan ====
Calatagan mayoralty elections
Party	Candidate	Votes	%
NPC	Peter Oliver Palacio	17,117	68.29
Nacionalista	Lenie Pantoja	7,945	31.70
Margin of victory		9,172	36.60%
Valid ballots		25,062	96.78%
Invalid or blank votes		834	3.22%
Total votes		25,896	100%
NPC hold			

Incumbent Andrea del Rosario is running for reelection.

Calatagan vice mayoralty elections
Party	Candidate	Votes	%
NPC	Rogelio Zarraga	14,394	59.04
Independent	Andrea del Rosario	8,026	32.92
Nacionalista	Kim Ruel Rodriguez	1,956	8.02
Margin of victory		6,368	26.12%
Valid ballots		24,376	94.13%
Invalid or blank votes		1,520	5.87%
Total votes		25,896	100%
NPC gain from Independent			

==== Lemery ====
Incumbent Eulalio Alilio is running for reelection.

Lemery mayoralty elections
Party	Candidate	Votes	%
Nacionalista	Eulalio Alilio	25,330	58.58
PDP–Laban	Honorlito Solis	17,910	41.42
Margin of victory		7,420	17.16%
Valid ballots		43,240	97.83%
Invalid or blank votes		957	2.17%
Total votes		44,197	100%
Nacionalista hold			

Incumbent Monnete Rosales-Gamo is running for reelection.

Lemery vice mayoralty elections
Party	Candidate	Votes	%
NPC	Geraldine Ornales	18,415	43.39
Nacionalista	Monette Rosales-Gamo	12,911	30.42
PDP–Laban	Jayvee Bendaña	11,119	26.20
Margin of victory		5,504	12.97%
Valid ballots		42,445	96.03%
Invalid or blank votes		1,752	3.96%
Total votes		44,197	100%
NPC gain from Nacionalista			

==== Lian ====
Incumbent Isagani Bolompo is running for reelection

Lian mayoralty elections
Party	Candidate	Votes	%
PDP–Laban	Isagani Bolompo	18,706	72.99
Nacionalista	Braulio Lagrisola	6,922	27.00
Margin of victory		11,784	44.41%
Valid ballots		25,628	96.59%
Invalid or blank votes		848	3.20%
Total votes		26,534	100%
PDP–Laban hold			

Incumbent Exequiel Bonuan is running for reelection.

Lian vice mayoralty elections
Party	Candidate	Votes	%
PDP–Laban	Joseph Peji	16,117	64.86
Nacionalista	Exequiel Bonuan	8,729	35.13
Margin of victory		7,388	27.84%
Valid ballots		24,846	93.63%
Invalid or blank votes		1,688	6.36%
Total votes		26,534	100%
PDP–Laban gain from Nacionalista			

==== Nasugbu ====
Incumbent Antonio Jose Barcelon is running for reelection. His opponent is former mayor Raymund Apacible. Initially, former mayor Rosario Apacible is running against Barcelon, however she withdrew her candidacy and substituted by his son.

Nasugbu mayoralty elections
Party	Candidate	Votes	%
Nacionalista	Antonio Jose Barcelon	35,241	63.44
PDP–Laban	Raymund Apacible	20,308	36.55
Margin of victory		14,933	26.88%
Valid ballots		55,549	96.59%
Invalid or blank votes		2,438	4.20%
Total votes		57,987	100%
Nacionalista hold			

Incumbent Larry Albanio is running for reelection.

Nasugbu vice mayoralty elections
Party	Candidate	Votes	%
Nacionalista	Larry Albanio	38,752	76.95
PDP–Laban	Ramoncito Baylosis	9,709	19.27
Independent	Ramon Lim	1,898	3.76
Margin of victory		29,043	57.67%
Valid ballots		50,359	86.85%
Invalid or blank votes		7,628	13.15%
Total votes		57,987	100%
Nacionalista hold			

==== Taal ====
Incumbent Fulgencio Mercado is running for reelection.

Taal mayoralty elections
Party	Candidate	Votes	%
Nacionalista	Fulgencio Mercado	19,193	67.55
PDP–Laban	Michael Montenegro	9,221	32.45
Margin of victory		9,972	35.10%
Valid ballots		28,414	97.42%
Invalid or blank votes		752	2.58%
Total votes		29,166	100%
Nacionalista hold			

Incumbent Jovito Albufera is running for reelection.

Taal vice mayoralty elections
Party	Candidate	Votes	%
Nacionalista	Jovito Albufera	14,621	52.14
PDP–Laban	Michael Villano	13,423	47.86
Margin of victory		1,198	4.27%
Valid ballots		28,044	96.15%
Invalid or blank votes		1,122	3.85%
Total votes		29,166	100%
Nacionalista hold			

==== Tuy ====
Incumbent Mayor Jose Jecerell Cerrado is term-limited and is running for Vice Mayor.

Tuy mayoralty election
Party	Candidate	Votes	%
Nacionalista	Armando Afable	13,349	64.70
PDP–Laban	Elsie Calingasan	7,282	35.30
Margin of victory		6,067	29.41%
Valid ballots		20,631	96.39%
Invalid or blank votes		773	3.61%
Total votes		21,404	100%
Nacionalista hold			

Incumbent Elsie Calingasan is running for Mayor.

Tuy vice mayoralty elections
Party	Candidate	Votes	%
Nacionalista	Jose Jecerell Cerrado	17,860	87.16
PDP–Laban	Emmanuel Calingasan	2,631	12.84
Margin of victory		15,229	74.32%
Valid ballots		20,491	95.73%
Invalid or blank votes		913	4.27%
Total votes		21,404	100%
Nacionalista gain from PDP–Laban			

=== 2nd District ===
- Municipality: Bauan, Lobo, Mabini, San Luis, San Pascual, Tingloy

==== Bauan ====
Mayor Julian Casapao who elevates the Mayorship after the death of Mayor Herminigildo Dolor is opted to run as Vice Mayor.

Bauan mayoralty elections
Party	Candidate	Votes	%
Nacionalista	Rhyan Dolor	21,470	50.61
PDDS	Juan Magboo	20,947	49.38
Margin of victory		523	1.23%
Valid ballots		42,417	97.87%
Invalid or blank votes		923	2.13%
Total votes		43,340	100%
Nacionalista hold			

Vice Mayor Ronald Cruzat who elevates the Vice Mayorship after the death of Mayor Herminigildo Dolor is opted to run as councilor.

Bauan vice mayoralty elections
Party	Candidate	Votes	%
Nacionalista	Julian Casapao	23,033	56.53
PDDS	Joey Castillo	17,711	43.46
Margin of victory		5,322	13.06%
Valid ballots		40,744	94.01%
Invalid or blank votes		2,596	5.99%
Total votes		43,340	100%
Nacionalista hold			

==== Lobo ====
Incumbent Gaudioso Manalo is running for reelection. His opponent is former Mayor Efren Diona.

Lobo mayoralty elections
Party	Candidate	Votes	%
Nacionalista	Gaudioso Manalo	13,411	66.29
PDDS	Efren Diona	6,790	33.56
Margin of victory		6,621	32.73%
Valid ballots		20,231	98.00%
Invalid or blank votes		413	2.00%
Total votes		20,644	100%
Nacionalista hold			

Lobo vice mayoralty elections
Party	Candidate	Votes	%
Nacionalista	Virgilio Manalo	12,491	65.14
PDDS	Dionisio Canuel, Jr.	6,685	34.86
Margin of victory		5,806	30.28%
Valid ballots		19,176	92.89%
Invalid or blank votes		1,468	7.11%
Total votes		20,644	100%
Nacionalista hold			

==== Mabini ====
Mabini mayoralty election
Party	Candidate	Votes	%
Nacionalista	Noel Luistro	16,012	72.41
PDP–Laban	Bayani Villanueva	6,101	27.59
Margin of victory		9,911	44.82%
Valid ballots		22,113	93.89%
Invalid or blank votes		1,440	6.11%
Total votes		23,553	100%
Nacionalista hold			

Incumbent Pablo Villanueva Jr. is running for reelection.

Mabini vice mayoralty elections
Party	Candidate	Votes	%
Nacionalista	Pablo Villanueva, Jr.	16,718	86.46
PDP–Laban	Democrito Mendoza	2,618	13.54
Margin of victory		14,100	72.92%
Valid ballots		19,336	82.10%
Invalid or blank votes		4,217	17.90%
Total votes		23,553	100%
Nacionalista hold			

==== San Luis ====
Incumbent Samuel Noel Ocampo is running for reelection. However, Mayor Samuel Noel Ocampo died on June 17, 2019, days before he was about to take oath. The winning Vice Mayor Danilo Medina will assume as Mayor.

San Luis mayoralty elections
Party	Candidate	Votes	%
Nacionalista	Samuel Noel Ocampo	12,425	66.85
NPC	Roberto De Castro	6,161	33.15
Margin of victory		6,264	33.70%
Valid ballots		18,586	98.03%
Invalid or blank votes		374	1.97%
Total votes		18,960	100%
Nacionalista hold			

Incumbent Danilo Medina is running for reelection. However, due to the death of the winning Mayor Samuel Noel Ocampo, the winning Vice Mayor Danilo Medina will assume as Mayor. The winning first councilor Oscarlito Hernandez will assume the post of Vice Mayor.

San Luis vice mayoralty elections
Party	Candidate	Votes	%
Nacionalista	Danilo Medina	10,259	56.98
NPC	Lilian Siscar-Ilagan	7,747	43.02
Margin of victory		2,512	13.95%
Valid ballots		18,006	94.97%
Invalid or blank votes		954	5.03%
Total votes		18,960	100%
Nacionalista hold			

==== San Pascual ====
San Pascual mayoralty elections
Party	Candidate	Votes	%
UNA	Antonio Dimayuga	16,910	54.03
PDP–Laban	Rosario Roanna Conti	14,386	45.97
Margin of victory		2,524	8.06%
Valid ballots		31,296	98.64%
Invalid or blank votes		433	1.36%
Total votes		31,729	100%
UNA gain from PDP–Laban			

Incumbent Antonio Dimayuga is running for mayor.

San Pascual vice mayoralty elections
Party	Candidate	Votes	%
UNA	Isagani Dimatatac	16,595	54.93
PDP–Laban	Jaime Collantes	13,616	45.06
Margin of victory		2,979	9.86%
Valid ballots		30,211	95.22%
Invalid or blank votes		1,518	4.78%
Total votes		31,729	100%
UNA hold			

==== Tingloy ====
Incumbent Mark Lawrence Alvarez is not running. His father, former Mayor Lauro Alvarez is his party's nominee.

Tingloy mayoralty elections
Party	Candidate	Votes	%
Nacionalista	Lauro Alvarez	4,523	50.60
Independent	Victor Binay	3,935	44.03
PDP–Laban	Adoracion Atienza	480	5.37
Margin of victory		588	6.58%
Valid ballots		8,938	97.98%
Invalid or blank votes		184	2.02%
Total votes		9,122	100%
Nacionalista hold			

Tingloy vice mayoralty elections
Party	Candidate	Votes	%
PDP–Laban	Rolando Masangkay	4,837	56.55
Nacionalista	Danilo Datingaling	3,717	43.45
Margin of victory		1,120	13.09%
Valid ballots		8,554	93.77%
Invalid or blank votes		568	6.23%
Total votes		9,122	100%
PDP–Laban hold			

=== 3rd District ===
- City: Tanauan City
- Municipality: Agoncillo, Alitagtag, Balete, Cuenca, Laurel, Malvar, Mataas na Kahoy, San Nicolas, Santa Teresita, Santo Tomas, Talisay

==== Tanauan City ====
Incumbent Mayor Jhoanna Corona-Villamor, who assumed office following the assassination of Mayor Antonio Halili, is running for Provincial Board Member, switching places with his father, incumbent Board Member Alfredo Corona. His opponents are former Mayor Sonia Torres-Aquino, former DFA Lipa Director Jesusa "Nancy" Garcia, Mary Angeline Halili, the daughter of the slain Mayor Antonio Halili, and Marcos Valdez. Pedrito Carandang withdrew from the race.

Tanauan City mayoralty elections
Party	Candidate	Votes	%
UNA	Mary Angeline Halili	41,757	45.99
Lakas	Sonia Aquino	27,381	30.16
Nacionalista	Alfredo Corona	20,132	22.17
Independent	Jesusa Garcia	1,217	1.34
Independent	Marcos Valdez	245	0.26
Independent	Pedrito Carandang	51	0.05
Margin of victory		14,376	15.42%
Valid ballots		90,783	97.40%
Invalid or blank votes		2,247	24.11%
Total votes		93,210	100%
UNA gain from Nacionalista			

Incumbent Vice Mayor Benedicto Corona, who assumed office following the assassination of Mayor Antonio Halili, is running for City Councilor. His party nominated former Vice Mayor Julius Caesar Platon II, the son of slain former Mayor Cesar Platon; however, Platon died due to heart attack on November 19, 2018. Marissa Tabing, wife of incumbent councilor Lim Tabing, withdrew her candidacy for councilor to become Platon's substitute. Her opponents are former City Administrator Herminigildo Trinidad Jr., Mary Jane Reyes, and Salvador Quimo.

Tanauan City vice mayoralty elections
Party	Candidate	Votes	%
UNA	Herminigildo Trinidad, Jr.	50,111	58.19
Nacionalista	Marissa Tabing	31,533	36.61
Independent	Mary Jane Reyes	3,317	3.87
Independent	Salvador Quimo	1,128	1.30
Margin of victory		18,578	19.93%
Valid ballots		86,109	92.38%
Invalid or blank votes		7,101	76.18%
Total votes		93,210	100%
UNA gain from Nacionalista			

==== Agoncillo ====
Agoncillo mayoralty elections
Party	Candidate	Votes	%
PDP–Laban	Daniel Reyes	15,396	84.11
Independent	Quintin Vergara	2,907	15.88
Margin of victory		12,489	64.57%
Valid ballots		18,303	94.62%
Invalid or blank votes		1,040	5.38%
Total votes		19,343	100%
PDP–Laban hold			

Agoncillo vice mayoralty elections
Party	Candidate	Votes	%
PDP–Laban	Danilo Anuran	15,374	100.00
Invalid or blank votes		3,969	20.51%
Total votes		19,343	100%
PDP–Laban hold			

==== Alitagtag ====
Alitagtag mayoralty elections
Party	Candidate	Votes	%
PDP–Laban	Edilberto Ponggos	6,207	42.83
Nacionalista	Reynaldo Rosales	4,157	28.68
NPC	Mary Therese Andal-Cruz	4,128	28.48
Margin of victory		2,050	13.96%
Valid ballots		14,492	98.68%
Invalid or blank votes		194	1.38%
Total votes		14,686	100%
PDP–Laban gain from NPC			

Alitagtag vice mayoralty elections
Party	Candidate	Votes	%
PDP–Laban	Bernardo Reyes, Jr.	6,887	50.64
NPC	Ambrosio Sandoval	6,712	49.35
Margin of victory		175	1.20%
Valid ballots		13,599	92.60%
Invalid or blank votes		1,087	7.40%
Total votes		14,686	100%
PDP–Laban hold			

==== Balete ====
Incumbent Wilson Maralit assumed office after the assassination of former Mayor Leovino Hidalgo.

Balete mayoralty election
Party	Candidate	Votes	%
Nacionalista	Wilson Maralit	7,932	66.77
PDP–Laban	Nova Ortega	3,783	31.84
Independent	Guillermo Bituin	141	1.18
Independent	Ma. Isabel Hidalgo	23	0.19
Margin of victory		4,149	34.44%
Valid ballots		11,879	98.62%
Invalid or blank votes		166	1.38%
Total votes		12,045	100%
Nacionalista hold			

Balete vice mayoralty election
Party	Candidate	Votes	%
Nacionalista	Alvin Payo	5,995	52.18
PDP–Laban	Graciano Garcia	2,437	21.21
Independent	Loreto Maralit	1,959	17.05
Independent	Victor Javier	1,096	9.54
Margin of victory		3,558	29.53%
Valid ballots		11,487	95.37%
Invalid or blank votes		558	4.63%
Total votes		12,045	100%
Nacionalista hold			

==== Cuenca ====
Cuenca mayoralty elections
Party	Candidate	Votes	%
Nacionalista	Faye Endaya-Barretto	7,504	39.20
PMB	Alexander Magpantay	7,225	37.74
PDP–Laban	Melvin Cuevas	4,411	23.04
Margin of victory		279	1.43%
Valid ballots		19,140	98.28%
Invalid or blank votes		335	1.72%
Total votes		19,475	100%
Nacionalista hold			

Incumbent Romulo Cuevas is running for reelection.

Cuenca vice mayoralty elections
Party	Candidate	Votes	%
Nacionalista	Romulo Cuevas	10,607	59.36
Independent	Dakila Matibag	4,365	24.42
PMB	Nicanor Cuevas	2,896	16.20
Margin of victory		6,242	32.05%
Valid ballots		17,868	91.74%
Invalid or blank votes		1,607	8.26%
Total votes		19,475	100%
Nacionalista hold			

==== Laurel ====
Incumbent Randy James Amo is term-limited and is running for board member.

Laurel mayoralty elections
Party	Candidate	Votes	%
PDP–Laban	Joan Amo	10,737	52.56
Independent	Roderick Natanuan	7,369	36.07
Nacionalista	Felimon Austria	2,321	11.36
Margin of victory		3,368	16.67%
Valid ballots		20,427	98.07%
Invalid or blank votes		403	1.93%
Total votes		20,830	100%
PDP–Laban hold			

Laurel vice mayoralty elections
Party	Candidate	Votes	%
PDP–Laban	Rachelle Ogalinola	9,406	47.58
Nacionalista	Angelito Rodriguez	5,667	28.66
Independent	Natalio Panganiban	4,695	23.75
Margin of victory		3,739	17.95%
Valid ballots		19,768	94.90%
Invalid or blank votes		1,062	5.10%
Total votes		20,830	100%
PDP–Laban gain from Nacionalista			

==== Malvar ====
Incumbent Cristeta Reyes is running for reelection. Her opponent is incumbent Vice Mayor Alberto Lat. Lat assumed office after the Office of the Ombudsman dismissed Mayor Cristeta Reyes. Former Mayor Carlito Reyes originally ran for the position since Reyes was perpetually disqualified from holding public office. But, he withdrew from his candidacy and substituted by his sister-in-law who reassumed the mayorship.

Malvar mayoralty election
Party	Candidate	Votes	%
PDP–Laban	Cristeta Reyes	13,799	54.47
Nacionalista	Alberto Lat	11,534	45.52
Margin of victory		2,265	8.74%
Valid ballots		25,333	97.83%
Invalid or blank votes		561	2.17%
Total votes		25,894	100%
PDP–Laban hold			

Incumbent Alberto Lat is running for Mayor. He assumed the mayorship after the dismissal of Mayor Cristeta Reyes. But he reassumed the position of Vice Mayor. His party nominated incumbent Senior Councilor Matt Louie Aranda.

Malvar vice mayoralty elections
Party	Candidate	Votes	%
Nacionalista	Matt Louie Aranda	13,603	54.74
PDP–Laban	Karina Reyes	11,247	45.25
Margin of victory		2,356	9.10%
Valid ballots		24,850	95.97%
Invalid or blank votes		1,044	4.03%
Total votes		25,894	100%
Nacionalista hold			

==== Mataasnakahoy ====
Incumbent Gualberto Silva is running for reelection.

Mataasnakahoy mayoralty elections
Party	Candidate	Votes	%
PDP–Laban	Janet Ilagan	8,542	57.73
PFP	Gualberto Silva	5,677	38.37
Independent	Chester Vergara	575	3.88
Margin of victory		2,865	19.02%
Valid ballots		14,794	98.22%
Invalid or blank votes		267	1.77%
Total votes		15,061	100%
PDP–Laban gain from PFP			

Incumbent Janet Ilagan is running for Mayor. Her husband, former Mayor Jay Ilagan is her party's nominee.

Mataasnakahoy vice mayoralty elections
Party	Candidate	Votes	%
PDP–Laban	Jay Ilagan	8,871	61.01
PFP	Henry Laqui	4,532	31.17
Independent	Puto Dimaano	1,135	7.80
Margin of victory		4,339	28.80%
Valid ballots		14,538	96.52%
Invalid or blank votes		523	3.48%
Total votes		15,061	100%
PDP–Laban hold			

==== San Nicolas ====
San Nicolas mayoralty elections
Party	Candidate	Votes	%
PDP–Laban	Lester De Sagun	6,156	46.33
PFP	Epifanio Sandoval	5,177	38.96
Nacionalista	William Enriquez	1,954	14.70
Margin of victory		979	7.27%
Valid ballots		13,287	98.67%
Invalid or blank votes		180	1.33%
Total votes		13,467	100%
PDP–Laban gain from Nacionalista			

San Nicolas vice mayoralty elections
Party	Candidate	Votes	%
PDP–Laban	Napoleon Arceo	6,029	46.95
PFP	Lucio Landicho	4,457	34.71
Nacionalista	Artemio Landicho	1,257	9.78
Independent	Remedios Bereña	1,097	8.54
Margin of victory		1,572	11.67%
Valid ballots		12,840	95.34%
Invalid or blank votes		627	4.66%
Total votes		13,467	100%
PDP–Laban gain from PFP			

==== Santa Teresita ====
Incumbent Ma. Aurea Segunial is term-limited and is running for Vice Mayor. Her husband, Norberto is her party's nominee. His opponent is incumbent Vice Mayor Carlos Bathan.

Santa Teresita mayoralty elections
Party	Candidate	Votes	%
Nacionalista	Norberto Segunial	5,594	52.81
Liberal	Carlos Bathan	4,997	47.18
Margin of victory		1,097	10.16%
Valid ballots		10,591	98.07%
Invalid or blank votes		208	1.92%
Total votes		10,799	100%
Nacionalista gain from PDP–Laban			

Incumbent Carlos Bathan is term-limited and is running for Mayor.

Santa Teresita vice mayoralty elections
Party	Candidate	Votes	%
PDP–Laban	Ma. Aurea Segunial	5,267	50.07
Liberal	Allen Bryan Atienza	3,191	30.33
Independent	Reynaldo Aquino, Jr.	2,061	19.59
Margin of victory		2,076	19.22%
Valid ballots		10,519	97.40%
Invalid or blank votes		280	2.60%
Total votes		10,799	100%
PDP–Laban gain from Liberal			

==== Santo Tomas ====
Incumbent Edna Sanchez is running for reelection.

Santo Tomas mayoralty elections
Party	Candidate	Votes	%
Nacionalista	Edna Sanchez	37,750	51.19
PDP–Laban	Arth Jhun Marasigan	34,714	47.07
Independent	Rey Meer	1,274	1.72
Margin of victory		3,036	4.03%
Valid ballots		73,738	97.97%
Invalid or blank votes		1,530	2.03%
Total votes		75,268	100%
Nacionalista hold			

Incumbent Armenius Silva is running for reelection.

Santo Tomas vice mayoralty elections
Party	Candidate	Votes	%
Nacionalista	Armenius Silva	36,999	52.60
PDP–Laban	Leovino Villegas	33,331	47.39
Margin of victory		3,668	4.87%
Valid ballots		70,330	93.43%
Invalid or blank votes		4,938	6.56%
Total votes		75,268	100%
Nacionalista hold			

==== Talisay ====
Talisay mayoralty election
Party	Candidate	Votes	%
Independent	Gerry Natanauan	14,947	100.00
Invalid or blank votes		7,414	33.15%
Total votes		22,361	100%
Independent hold			

Talisay vice mayoralty election
Party	Candidate	Votes	%
PDP–Laban	Charlie Natanauan	13,219	67.46
Independent	Felix Pesigan	6,375	32.53
Margin of victory		6,844	30.60%
Valid ballots		19,594	87.62%
Invalid or blank votes		2,767	12.37%
Total votes		22,361	100%
PDP–Laban hold			

=== 4th District ===
- Municipality: Ibaan, Padre Garcia, Rosario, San Jose, San Juan, Taysan

==== Ibaan ====
Incumbent Mayor Juan Toreja is term-limited. His party nominated former Mayor Artemio Chua. His main opponent is incumbent Vice Mayor Edralyn Joy Salvame.

Ibaan mayoralty elections
Party	Candidate	Votes	%
PDP–Laban	Edralyn Joy Salvame	16,285	50.25
Nacionalista	Artemio Chua	16,135	49.75
Margin of victory		150	0.45
Valid ballots		32,420	98.55
Invalid or blank votes		479	14.55
Total votes		32,899	100%
PDP–Laban gain from Nacionalista			

Incumbent Edralyn Joy Salvame is running for Mayor. Her party nominated incumbent Councilor Juvy Mendoza. Her opponents are incumbent councilors Socrates Arellano, Cesar Marasigan and Pio Roberto.

Ibaan vice mayoralty elections
Party	Candidate	Votes	%
Nacionalista	Socrates Arellano	12,261	38.72
PDP–Laban	Juvy Mendoza	11,266	35.58
Independent	Cesar Marasigan	7,334	23.16
Independent	Pio Roberto Austria	800	2.52
Margin of victory		995	30.24
Valid ballots		31,661	96.24
Invalid or blank votes		1,238	37.63
Total votes		32,899	100%
Nacionalista gain from PDP–Laban			

==== Padre Garcia ====
Incumbent Michael Angelo Rivera is not running. His wife, Celsa is his party's nominee. Her opponent is former ABC President Nicetas Amante.

Padre Garcia mayoralty elections
Party	Candidate	Votes	%
Nacionalista	Celsa Rivera	17,095	67.99
NPC	Nicetas Amante	8,048	32.00
Margin of victory		9,047	30.24
Valid ballots		25,143	98.24
Invalid or blank votes		450	17.58
Total votes		25,593	100%
Nacionalista hold			

Incumbent Noel Cantos is running for reelection.

Padre Garcia mayoralty elections
Party	Candidate	Votes	%
Nacionalista	Noel Cantos	19,337	100.00
Invalid or blank votes		6,256	24.44
Total votes		25,593	100%
Nacionalista hold			

==== Rosario ====
Both Mayor Manuel Alvarez and Vice Mayor Leovigildo Morpe will stand unopposed for reelection.

Rosario mayoralty elections
Party	Candidate	Votes	%
PDP–Laban	Manuel Alvarez	49,250	100.00
Invalid or blank votes		9,474	24.44
Total votes		58,724	100%
PDP–Laban hold			

Rosario vice mayoralty elections
Party	Candidate	Votes	%
Nacionalista	Leovigildo Morpe	48,281	100.00
Invalid or blank votes		10,443	17.78
Total votes		58,724	100%
Nacionalista hold			

==== San Jose ====
Incumbent Valentino Patron is running for reelection.

San Jose mayoralty elections
Party	Candidate	Votes	%
Nacionalista	Valentino Patron	34,536	95.81
Independent	Genaro Masilungan, Jr.	1,507	4.18
Margin of victory		33,029	80.55
Valid ballots		36,043	87.90
Invalid or blank votes		4,960	12.10
Total votes		41,003	100%
Nacionalista hold			

Incumbent Entiquio Briones is running for reelection

San Jose vice mayoralty elections
Party	Candidate	Votes	%
Independent	Noel Virtucio	25,114	63.23
Nacionalista	Entiquio Briones	14,602	36.76
Margin of victory		10,512	25.63
Valid ballots		39,716	96.86
Invalid or blank votes		1,287	3.14
Total votes		41,003	100%
Independent gain from Nacionalista			

==== San Juan ====
Incumbent Mayor Rodolfo Manalo is term-limited. His wife, Teresita is his party's nominee. Her opponents are Pastor Noel Castillo and incumbent Vice Mayor Ildebrando Salud.

San Juan mayoralty elections
Party	Candidate	Votes	%
NPC	Ildebrando "Beebong" Salud	30,943	56.10
Nacionalista	Teresita Manalo	23,832	43.20
PDDS	Noel Castillo	380	0.62
Margin of victory		7,111	12.61
Valid ballots		55,155	97.79
Invalid or blank votes		1,248	2.21
Total votes		56,403	100%
NPC gain from Nacionalista			

Incumbent Ildebrando Salud is running for Mayor. His party nominated incumbent councilor Florencio De Chavez. His opponents are Ruel Carandang and former Vice Mayor Octavio Antonio Marasigan.

San Juan vice mayoralty elections
Party	Candidate	Votes	%
Nacionalista	Octavio Antonio Marasigan	29,044	54.64
NPC	Florencio De Chavez	23,864	44.89
PDDS	Ruel Carandang	243	0.45
Margin of victory		5,180	9.18
Valid ballots		53,151	94.23
Invalid or blank votes		3,252	57.66
Total votes		56,403	100%
Nacionalista gain from NPC			

==== Taysan ====
Incumbent Grande Gutierrez is running for reelection. His opponent is former Mayor Victor Portugal Jr.

Taysan mayoralty elections
Party	Candidate	Votes	%
Nacionalista	Grande Gutierrez	12,673	59.41
NPC	Victor Portugal, Jr.	8,657	40.58
Margin of victory		4,016	18.54
Valid ballots		21,330	98.46
Invalid or blank votes		334	15.41
Total votes		21,664	100%
Nacionalista hold			

Incumbent Marianito Perez is running for reelection.

Taysan vice mayoralty elections
Party	Candidate	Votes	%
Nacionalista	Marianito Perez	12,375	60.33
NPC	Ronald Ancheta	6,839	33.34
Independent	Pedro Jimmy Delos Reyes	1,297	6.32
Margin of victory		5,536	25.55
Valid ballots		20,511	94.68
Invalid or blank votes		1,153	53.22
Total votes		21,664	100%
Nacionalista hold			

=== 5th District ===
- City: Batangas City

==== Batangas City ====
Incumbent Mayor Beverley Rose Dimacuha and Vice Mayor Emilio Francisco Berberabe Jr. will stand unopposed for reelection.

Batangas City mayoralty elections
Party	Candidate	Votes	%
Nacionalista	Beverley Rose Dimacuha	136,055	100.00
Invalid or blank votes		16,199	10.64%
Total votes		152,254	100%
Nacionalista hold			

Batangas City Vice Mayoralty Election
Party	Candidate	Votes	%
PDP–Laban	Emilio Berberabe Jr.	134,529	100.00%
Invalid or blank votes		17,725	11.64%
Total votes		152,254	100.00%
PDP–Laban hold			

=== 6th District ===
- City: Lipa City

==== Lipa City ====
Lipa City mayoralty elections
Party	Candidate	Votes	%
Nacionalista	Eric Africa	78,109	49.69
NPC	Bernadette Sabili	76,511	48.67
Independent	Mario Panganiban	2,575	1.64
Margin of victory		1,598	1.02%
Valid ballots		157,195	97.01%
Invalid or blank votes		4,874	3.01%
Total votes		162,042	100.00
Nacionalista gain from NPC			

Lipa City vice mayoralty elections
Party	Candidate	Votes	%
Nacionalista	Mark Aries Luancing	63,848	42.31
NPC	Ruben Umali	47,795	31.68
Independent	Merlo Silva	36,739	24.35
Independent	Ricardo Leyesa	2,488	1.65
Margin of victory		11,056	7.33%
Valid ballots		150,870	93.11%
Invalid or blank votes		11,172	6.89%
Total votes		162,042	100.00
Nacionalista hold			
