= 2016 Batangas local elections =

2016 Batangas gubernatorial election
- May 9, 2016
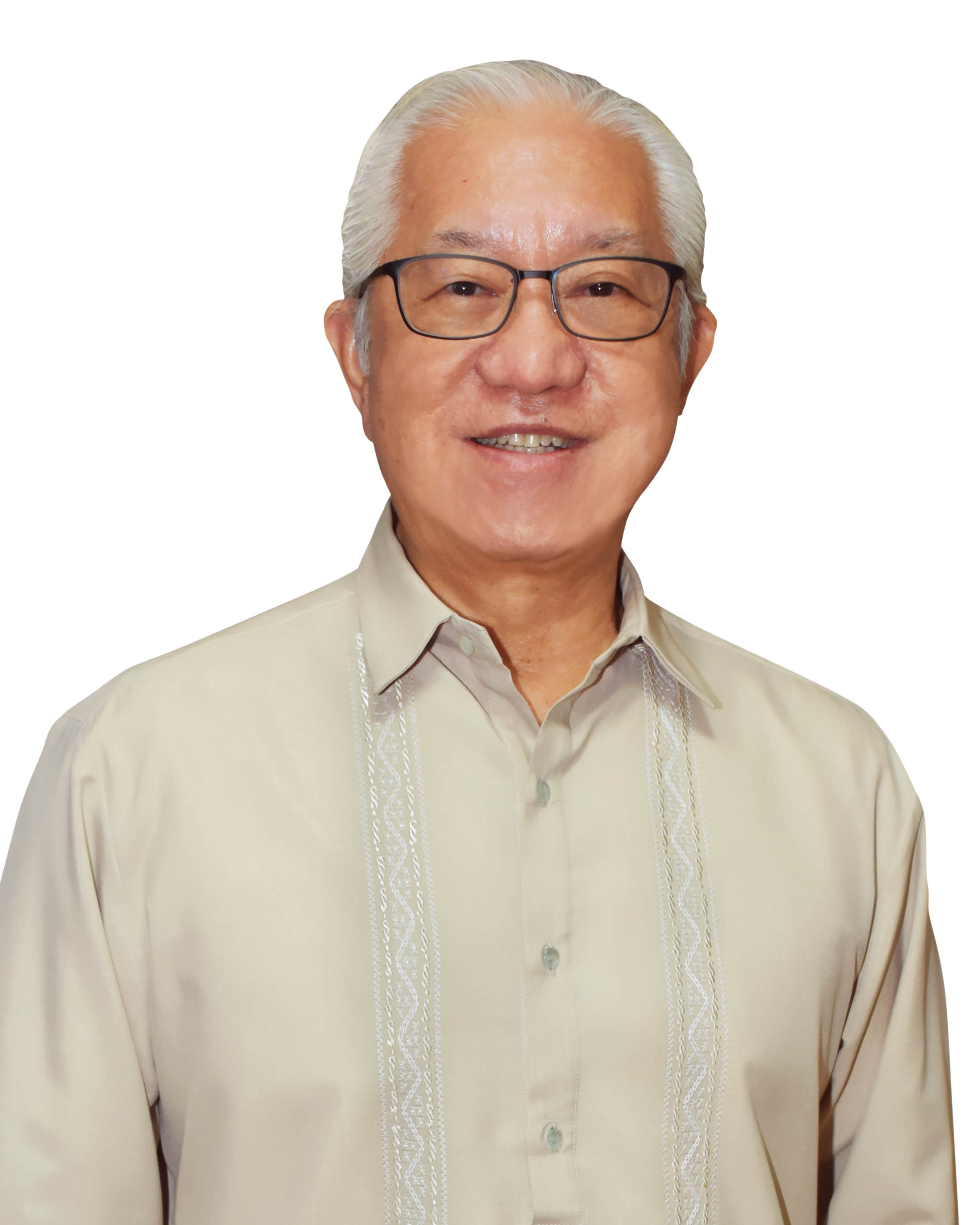

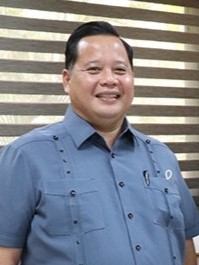

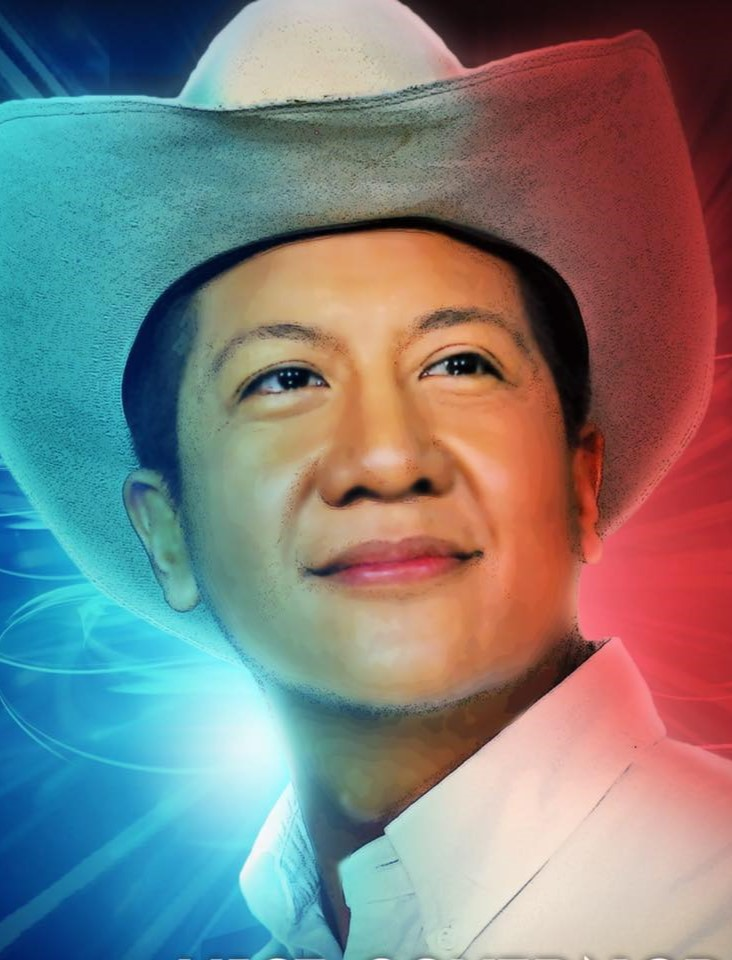

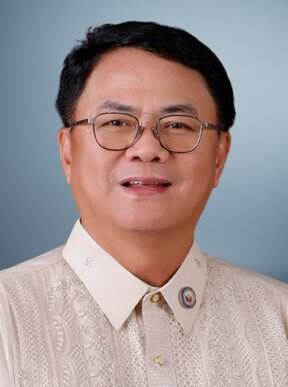
Nominee	Hermilando Mandanas	Mark Llandro Mendoza	Jose Antonio Leviste II
Party	Independent	NPC	Liberal
Running mate	N/A	Sofronio Ona, Jr.	Caloy Bolilia
Popular vote	337,829	293,852	292,665
Percentage	26.80%	23.31%	23.21%
Nominee	Nicanor Briones	Marcos Mandanas
Party	PDP–Laban	Independent
Running mate	Chona Dimayuga	N/A
Popular vote	204,726	19,797
Percentage	16.24%	1.57%
Governor before election
Vilma Santos-Recto
Liberal
Elected Governor
Hermilando Mandanas
Independent

Local elections were held in Batangas on May 9, 2016, as part of the 2016 general election. Voters will select candidates for all local positions: a town mayor, vice mayor and town councilors, as well as members of the Sangguniang Panlalawigan, the vice-governor, governor and for the six districts of Batangas.

== Provincial elections ==
The candidates for governor and vice governor with the highest number of votes wins the seat; they are voted separately, therefore, they may be of different parties when elected. Incumbent Governor Vilma Santos-Recto and Vice Governor Mark Leviste is barred from seeking reelection since they are in their third term.

=== Governor ===
Incumbent Vilma Santos-Recto is barred to seek another term, she instead will run for Congress in the 6th District. Incumbent Vice Governor Mark Leviste is her party's nominee. His main opponents are AGAP Party- list Representative Nicanor Briones, former 3-termer Governor and former 3-termer 2nd District Representative Hermilando Mandanas, incumbent 4th District Representative Mark Llandro Mendoza and Marcos Mandanas, Sr.

Batangas gubernatorial election
Party	Candidate	Votes	%
Independent	Hermilando Mandanas	337,829	26.79%
NPC	Mark Llandro Mendoza	293,852	23.31%
Liberal	Jose Antonio Leviste II	292,665	23.21%
PDP–Laban	Nicanor Briones	204,756	16.24%
Independent	Marcos Mandanas, Sr.	19,797	1.57%
Margin of victory		43,977	3.48%
Valid ballots		1,148,899	91.14%
Invalid or blank votes		111,705	8.86%
Total votes		1,260,604	100%
Turnout		1,526,195	82.60%
Independent gain from Liberal			

=== Vice Governor ===
Incumbent Jose Antonio Leviste II is barred to seek reelection and is running for governor. His party nominated incumbent 4th District Board Member Caloy Bolilia. His main opponents are former 3rd District Board Member Chona Dimayuga, Danilo Guste and former Calaca, Batangas Mayor Sofronio Ona Jr.

Batangas vice gubernatorial election
Party	Candidate	Votes	%
NPC	Sofronio Ona, Jr.	521,397	41.36%
Liberal	Caloy Bolilia	383,287	30.41%
PDP–Laban	Chona Dimayuga	150,214	11.92%
KBL	Danilo Guste	6,648	0.52%
Margin of victory		138,110	10.95%
Valid ballots		1,061,546	84.21%
Invalid or blank votes		199,058	15.79%
Total votes		1,260,604	100%
Turnout		1,526,195	82.60%
NPC gain from Liberal			

== Congressional elections ==
=== 1st District ===
Eileen Ermita-Buhain is the incumbent

2016 Philippine House of Representatives election in Batangas's 1st District
Party	Candidate	Votes	%
Nacionalista	Eileen Ermita-Buhain	191,351	69.49%
Independent	Valentino Lopez	43,846	15.92%
Margin of victory		147,505	53.57%
Valid ballots		235,197	85.41%
Invalid or blank votes		40,164	14.59%
Total votes		275,361	100%
Nacionalista hold			

=== 2nd District ===
Raneo Abu is the incumbent

2016 Philippine House of Representatives election in Batangas's 2nd District
Party	Candidate	Votes	%
Nacionalista	Raneo Abu	78,365	54.39%
NUP	Nicasio Conti	52,733	36.60%
Margin of victory		25,632	17.79%
Valid ballots		131,098	90.99%
Invalid or blank votes		12,978	9.01%
Total votes		144,076	100%
Nacionalista hold			

=== 3rd District ===
Nelson Collantes is the incumbent. His opponent is DZJV reporter Nestor Burgos. On October 17, Burgos withdrew his candidacy, thus resulting to Collantes running unopposed. On December 10, Collantes also withdrew his candidacy to give way to his wife, Maria Theresa.

2016 Philippine House of Representatives election in Batangas's 3rd District
Party	Candidate	Votes	%
Liberal	Maria Theresa Collantes	186,440	58.04%
Invalid or blank votes		134,768	41.96%
Total votes		321,208	100%
Liberal hold			

=== 4th District ===
Incumbent Mark Llandro Mendoza is the last Representative of the 4th District of Batangas. Running for a seat are former Board Member Lianda Bolilia and incumbent Taysan Mayor Victor Portugal, Jr.

2016 Philippine House of Representatives election in Batangas's 4th District
Party	Candidate	Votes	%
Liberal	Lianda Bolilia	110,485	50.29%
NPC	Victor Portugal, Jr.	91,392	41.60%
Margin of victory		19,093	8.69%
Valid ballots		201,877	91.89%
Invalid or blank votes		17,811	8.11%
Total votes		219,688	100%
Liberal win (new seat)			

=== 5th District (Batangas City) ===
Incumbent 2nd District Board Member Mario Vittorio Mariño will run for the newly created 5th District against Danilo Berberabe, Felipe Baroja, Carloto Bisa and former Justice Secretary Hernando Perez.

2016 Philippine House of Representatives election in Batangas's 5th District (Lone District of Batangas City)
Party	Candidate	Votes	%
Liberal	Mario Vittorio Mariño	69,577	45.92%
UNA	Danilo Berberabe	46,967	31.00%
Independent	Hernando Perez	15,951	10.52%
Independent	Felipe Baroja	5,587	3.69%
Independent	Carlito Bisa	4,145	2.74%
Margin of victory		22,610	14.92%
Valid ballots		142,227	93.87%
Invalid or blank votes		9,284	6.13%
Total votes		151,511	100%
Liberal win (new seat)			

=== 6th District (Lipa City) ===
Incumbent Mark Llandro Mendoza who came from the 4th District is term-limited and is running for Governor. Running for a seat in Congress is Bernadette Sabili, wife of Mayor Meynard Sabili and incumbent Governor Vilma Santos-Recto. Initially, Sabili is running under the National Unity Party. Like her husband, the party withdrew her nomination due to its coalition with the Liberal Party. As a result, Sabili is running as an independent.

2016 Philippine House of Representatives election in Batangas's 6th District (Lone District of Lipa City)
Party	Candidate	Votes	%
Liberal	Vilma Santos-Recto	83,492	56.13%
NUP	Bernadette Sabili	60,472	40.65%
Margin of victory		23,020	15.48%
Valid ballots		143,964	96.78%
Invalid or blank votes		4,796	3.22%
Total votes		148,760	100%
Liberal gain from NUP			

== Sangguniang Panlalawigan election ==
All six districts of Batangas will elect Sangguniang Panlalawigan or provincial board members.

=== 1st District ===
- Municipalities: Balayan, Calaca, Calatagan, Lemery, Lian, Nasugbu, Taal, Tuy
- Population (2010): 546,811

Parties are as stated in their certificate of candidacies.

Batangas 1st District Sangguniang Panlalawigan election
Party	Candidate	Votes	%
Independent	Roman Rosales, Jr.	107,175	29.89%
Liberal	Ramon Bausas	91,495	25.51%
Independent	Rowena Raquel Rodriguez	60,418	16.85%
Liberal	Sophia Palacio	44,193	12.32%
NPC	Christopher Jones Bello	38,130	10.63%
Independent	Robert Landicho	17,121	4.77%
Total votes		422,532	100%

=== 2nd District ===
Municipalities: Bauan, Lobo, Mabini, San Luis, San Pascual, Tingloy

- Population (2010): 269,981

Batangas 2nd District Sangguniang Panlalawigan election
Party	Candidate	Votes	%
UNA	Wilson Rivera	51,235	23.92%
Independent	Arlina Magboo	43,317	20.23%
Liberal	Contesa Buted	40,638	18.97%
Liberal	Amelia Alvarez	29,519	13.78%
Independent	Mara Fernandez	22,395	10.45%
Independent	Efren Reyes	11,843	5.53%
UNA	Arnel Arevalo	9,380	4.38%
Independent	Genaro Abreu	5,794	2.70%
Total votes		214,121	100%

=== 3rd District ===
- City: Tanauan City
- Municipalities: Agoncillo, Alitagtag, Balete, Cuenca, Laurel, Malvar, Mataas na Kahoy, San Nicolas, Santa Teresita, Santo Tomas, Talisay
- Population (2010): 574,443

Batangas 3rd District Sangguniang Panlalawigan election
Party	Candidate	Votes	%
Liberal	Alfredo Corona	142,754	38.87%
Liberal	Divina Balba	124,169	33.81%
Nacionalista	Pedro Reyes	61,687	16.79%
Independent	Lino Rustia	38,599	10.51%
Total votes		367,209	100%

=== 4th District ===
- Municipalities: Ibaan, Padre Garcia, Rosario, San Jose, San Juan, Taysan
- Population (2010): 397,085

Batangas 4th District Sangguniang Panlalawigan election
Party	Candidate	Votes	%
Liberal	Jonas Patrick Gozos	80,028	26.27
Liberal	Jesus De Veyra	73,177	24.02
NPC	Gerald Alday	54,339	17.84
Independent	Federico Caisip	50,331	16.52
NPC	Jessie Patron	46,791	15.36
Total votes		304,666	100.00

=== 5th District ===
- City: Batangas City
- Population (2010): 305,607

Batangas 5th District Sangguniang Panlalawigan election
Party	Candidate	Votes	%
Liberal	Claudette Ambida	74,221	33.42
Liberal	Arthur Blanco	73,186	32.96
PDP–Laban	Jose Virgilio Tolentino	47,262	21.28
Independent	Angelito Bagui	27,395	12.34
Total votes		222,064	100.00

=== 6th District ===
- City: Lipa City
- Population (2010): 283,468

Batangas 6th District Sangguniang Panlalawigan election
Party	Candidate	Votes	%
Liberal	Rowena Africa	94,575	48.99
Liberal	Lydio Lopez, Jr.	69,049	35.77
Independent	Romano Gonzales	32,436	16.80
Total votes		193,060	100.00

== City and municipal elections ==
All municipalities of Batangas, Batangas City, Lipa City and Tanauan City will elect mayor and vice-mayor this election. The candidates for mayor and vice mayor with the highest number of votes wins the seat; they are voted separately, therefore, they may be of different parties when elected. Below is the list of mayoralty and vice-mayoralty candidates of each city and municipalities per district

=== 1st District ===
- Municipality: Balayan, Calaca, Calatagan, Lemery, Lian, Nasugbu, Taal, Tuy

==== Balayan ====
Incumbent Emmanuel Fronda is term-limited. His son, Emmanuel Salvador II is his party's nominee.

Balayan mayoralty elections
Party	Candidate	Votes	%
PGP	Emmanuel Salvador Fronda II	16,834	41.60%
UNA	Francisco Ramos	9,916	24.50%
Liberal	Rodel Macalindong	9,290	22.96%
PDP–Laban	Rommel Castelo II	3,070	7.59%
LDP	Pedro Malabanan	49	0.12%
Margin of victory		6,918	8.69%
Valid ballots		39,159	96.77%
Invalid or blank votes		1,308	3.23%
Total votes		40,467	100%
PGP hold			

Incumbent Joel Arada is running for reelection.

Balayan vice mayoralty elections
Party	Candidate	Votes	%
UNA	Joel Arada	16,822	41.57%
Liberal	Efren Chavez	16,714	41.30%
LDP	Cristeta Caraig	3,425	8.46%
Margin of victory		108	0.27%
Valid ballots		36,961	91.34%
Invalid or blank votes		3,506	8.66%
Total votes		40,467	100%
UNA hold			

==== Calaca ====
Incumbent Sofronio Manuel Ona is running for reelection.

Calaca mayoralty elections
Party	Candidate	Votes	%
NPC	Sofronio Manuel Ona	29,740	78.18%
Liberal	Raphaelito Abitan	6,074	15.97%
Margin of victory		23,666	62.21%
Valid ballots		35,814	94.15%
Invalid or blank votes		2,226	5.85%
Total votes		38,040	100%
NPC hold			

Incumbent Renante Macalindong is running for reelection unopposed.

Calaca vice mayoralty elections
Party	Candidate	Votes	%
NPC	Renante Macalindong	27,563	72.46%
Invalid or blank votes		10,477	27.54%
Total votes		38,040	100%
NPC hold			

==== Calatagan ====
Incumbent Mayor Sophia Palacio is term limited and is running for Board Member. Her husband, former Mayor Peter Oliver Palacio is her party's nominee. His opponent is former Vice Mayor Lenie Pantoja

Calatagan mayoralty elections
Party	Candidate	Votes	%
Liberal	Peter Oliver Palacio	13,049	49.40%
UNA	Lenie Pantoja	12,214	46.24%
Margin of victory		835	0.16%
Valid ballots		25,263	95.64%
Invalid or blank votes		2,226	4.36%
Total votes		26,416	100%
Liberal hold			

Incumbent Glen Aytona is running for reelection. His opponents are actress Andrea del Rosario and Michael Anzalado.

Calatagan vice mayoralty elections
Party	Candidate	Votes	%
UNA	Andrea del Rosario	13,572	51.38%
Liberal	Glenn Aytona	8,307	31.45%
PGP	Michael Anzalado	2,709	10.26%
Margin of victory		5,265	19.93%
Valid ballots		24,588	93.08%
Invalid or blank votes		1,828	6.92%
Total votes		26,416	100%
UNA gain from Liberal			

==== Lemery ====
Incumbent Charisma Alilio is not running. Her husband, former Mayor Eulalio Alilio is her party's nominee.

Lemery mayoralty elections
Party	Candidate	Votes	%
Liberal	Eulalio Alilio	20,677	51.62%
PDP–Laban	Honorlito Solis	12,187	30.42%
UNA	Jayvee Bendaña	6,037	15.07%
Margin of victory		8,490	21.20%
Valid ballots		38,901	97.11%
Invalid or blank votes		1,157	2.89%
Total votes		40,058	100%
Liberal hold			

Incumbent Honorlito Solis is running for Mayor.

Lemery vice mayoralty elections
Party	Candidate	Votes	%
Liberal	Monette Rosales-Gamo	21,064	52.58%
UNA	Vincent Vergara	14,453	36.08%
Margin of victory		6,611	16.50%
Valid ballots		35,517	88.66%
Invalid or blank votes		4,541	11.34%
Total votes		40,058	100%
Liberal gain from PDP–Laban			

==== Lian ====
Incumbent Isagani Bolompo is running for reelection

Lian mayoralty elections
Party	Candidate	Votes	%
UNA	Isagani Bolompo	14,714	57.97%
NPC	Osita Vergara	8,621	33.97%
Liberal	Ely Maranan	1,631	6.43%
Margin of victory		6,093	24.00%
Valid ballots		24,966	98.37%
Invalid or blank votes		414	1.63%
Total votes		25,380	100%
UNA hold			

Incumbent Braulio Lagrisola is running for reelection.

Lian vice mayoralty elections
Party	Candidate	Votes	%
UNA	Exy Bonuan	10,131	39.92%
NPC	Ompong Butiong	7,778	30.65%
Liberal	Braulio Lagrisola	5,846	23.03%
Margin of victory		2,353	9.27%
Valid ballots		23,755	93.60%
Invalid or blank votes		1,625	6.40%
Total votes		25,380	100%
UNA gain from Liberal			

==== Nasugbu ====
Incumbent Rosario Apacible is running for reelection.

Nasugbu mayoralty elections
Party	Candidate	Votes	%
UNA	Antonio Barcelon	28,739	51.10%
Liberal	Rosario Apacible	24,554	43.65%
Lakas	Dionisia Limboc	322	0.57%
Margin of victory		4,185	7.45%
Valid ballots		53,615	95.32%
Invalid or blank votes		2,631	4.68%
Total votes		56,246	100%
UNA gain from Liberal			

Incumbent Larry Albanio is running for reelection.

Nasugbu vice mayoralty elections
Party	Candidate	Votes	%
UNA	Larry Albanio	30,275	53.83%
Liberal	Ramoncito Baylosis	18,639	33.14%
Lakas	Maria Mercedes Pesigan	412	0.73%
Margin of victory		11,636	20.69%
Valid ballots		49,326	87.70%
Invalid or blank votes		6,920	12.30%
Total votes		56,246	100%
UNA hold			

==== Taal ====
Incumbent Michael Montenegro is term limited. His party nominated incumbent Vice Mayor Fulgencio Mercado.

Taal mayoralty elections
Party	Candidate	Votes	%
Liberal	Fulgencio Mercado	13,932	49.48%
NPC	Michael Rey Villano	13,387	47.52%
PDP–Laban	Enrico Navarro	150	0.53%
Margin of victory		545	1.96%
Valid ballots		27,469	97.55%
Invalid or blank votes		689	2.45%
Total votes		28,158	100%
Liberal hold			

Incumbent Fulgencio Mercado is term limited and is running for Mayor.

Taal vice mayoralty elections
Party	Candidate	Votes	%
Nacionalista	Jovito Albufera	13,341	47.38%
Liberal	Edward Alvarez	13,204	46.89%
Margin of victory		137	0.49%
Valid ballots		26,545	94.27%
Invalid or blank votes		1,613	5.73%
Total votes		28,158	100%
Nacionalista gain from Liberal			

==== Tuy ====
Incumbent Mayor Jose Jecerell Cerrado is running for reelection unopposed.

Tuy mayoralty election
Party	Candidate	Votes	%
Liberal	Jose Jecerell Cerrado	16,789	83.34%
Invalid or blank votes		3,357	16.66%
Total votes		20,146	100%
Liberal hold			

Incumbent Ritcher Rodriguez is running for reelection.

Tuy vice mayoralty elections
Party	Candidate	Votes	%
Lakas	Elsie Calingasan	9,299	46.16%
Liberal	Ritcher Rodriguez	9,110	45.22%
Margin of victory		189	0.94%
Valid ballots		18,409	91.38%
Invalid or blank votes		1,737	8.62%
Total votes		20,146	100%
Lakas gain from Liberal			

=== 2nd District ===
- Municipality: Bauan, Lobo, Mabini, San Luis, San Pascual, Tingloy

==== Bauan ====
Incumbent Ryanh Dolor is term limited. His father, former Mayor and Liga ng mga Barangay Provincial Federation President Herminigildo Dolor is running for mayor under United Nationalist Alliance. His opponents are Mario Bejer and Juan Magboo.

Bauan mayoralty elections
Party	Candidate	Votes	%
UNA	Herminigildo Dolor	24,222	58.31%
Liberal	Juan Magboo	15,312	36.86%
PGP	Mario Bejer	531	1.28%
Margin of victory		8,910	21.45
Valid ballots		40,065	96.45%
Invalid or blank votes		1,473	3.55%
Total votes		41,538	100%
UNA hold			

Incumbent Julian Casapao is running for reelection. His opponents are Presnedy Bacal, Romel Basilan and Gaudencio Masangcay.

Bauan vice mayoralty elections
Party	Candidate	Votes	%
UNA	Julian Casapao	16,577	39.91%
Liberal	Presnedy Bacal	9,955	23.97%
PMP	Romel Basilan	7,341	17.67%
Lakas	Gaudencio Masangcay	5,430	13.07%
Margin of victory		6,622	15.94%
Valid ballots		39,303	94.62%
Invalid or blank votes		2,235	5.38%
Total votes		41,538	100%
UNA hold			

==== Lobo ====
Incumbent Gaudioso Manalo is running for reelection. His opponent is former Mayor Efren Diona

Lobo mayoralty elections
Party	Candidate	Votes	%
Liberal	Gaudioso Manalo	11,838	56.85%
UNA	Efren Diona	8,491	40.78%
Margin of victory		3,347	16.07%
Valid ballots		20,329	97.62%
Invalid or blank votes		495	2.38%
Total votes		20,824	100%
Liberal hold			

Incumbent Renato Perez is running for reelection.

Lobo vice mayoralty elections
Party	Candidate	Votes	%
Liberal	Renato Perez	7,111	34.15%
UNA	Geronimo Alfiler	7,033	33.77%
PMP	Amador Ambrocio Sulit	2,869	13.78%
PDP–Laban	Angelito Abiera	2,651	12.73%
Margin of victory		78	0.38%
Valid ballots		19,664	94.43%
Invalid or blank votes		1,160	5.57%
Total votes		20,824	100%
Liberal hold			

==== Mabini ====
Incumbent Nilo Villanueva is term limited. His party nominated incumbent Vice Mayor Elmar Panopio.

Mabini mayoralty elections
Party	Candidate	Votes	%
Liberal	Noel Luistro	9,419	38.92%
UNA	Richard Villanueva	8,130	33.60%
NPC	Elmar Panopio	5,265	21.76%
Nacionalista	Daniel Aldrin Calangi	865	3.57%
Margin of victory		1,289	5.32%
Valid ballots		23,679	97.86%
Invalid or blank votes		519	2.14%
Total votes		24,198	100%
Liberal gain from NPC			

Incumbent Elmar Panopio is running for Mayor.

Mabini vice mayoralty elections
Party	Candidate	Votes	%
Liberal	Pablo Villanueva	8,656	35.77%
NPC	Jose Nelson Hernandez	7,794	32.21%
Lakas	Gil Guerra	5,106	21.10%
Margin of victory		862	3.56%
Valid ballots		21,556	89.08%
Invalid or blank votes		2,642	10.92%
Total votes		24,198	100%
Liberal gain from NPC			

==== San Luis ====
Incumbent Samuel Noel Ocampo is running for a first full three-year term.

San Luis mayoralty elections
Party	Candidate	Votes	%
Liberal	Samuel Noel Ocampo	9,244	52.50
NPC	Rodolfo Mendoza	8,374	47.50
Total votes		17,618	100.00
Liberal hold			

Incumbent Danilo Medina is running for a first full three-year term.

San Luis vice mayoralty elections
Party	Candidate	Votes	%
Liberal	Danilo Medina	9,437	55.40
NPC	Loreto Huerto	7,601	44.60
Total votes		17,038	100.00
Liberal hold			

==== San Pascual ====
Incumbent Antonio Dimayuga is barred to seek another term, he instead will run for vice-mayor. Incumbent Vice Mayor Davis Fider is his party's nominee. His main opponent is Roanna Conti. It is her third time to run in mayoralty position.

San Pascual mayoralty elections
Party	Candidate	Votes	%
Liberal	Rosario Roanna Conti	14,577	50.90
NPC	Davis Fider	14,039	49.10
Total votes		28,616	100.00
Liberal gain from NPC			

Incumbent Davis Fider is barred to seek another term, he instead will run for mayor. Incumbent Mayor Antonio Dimayuga is his party's nominee. His main opponents are Claro Conti and Norman Dimatatac.

San Pascual vice mayoralty elections
Party	Candidate	Votes	%
NPC	Antonio Dimayuga	18,116	64.50
Liberal	Norman Dimatatac	8,369	29.80
UNA	Claro Conti	1,601	5.70
Total votes		28,086	100.00

==== Tingloy ====
Incumbent Lauro Alvarez is term limited. His son, former SK Provincial Federation President Mark Lawrence Alvarez is his party's nominee.

Tingloy mayoralty elections
Party	Candidate	Votes	%
Liberal	Mark Lawrence Alvarez	5,089	56.00
UNA	Victor Binay	4,003	44.00
Total votes		9,192	100.00

Incumbent Danilo Datingaling is running for Councilor.

Tingloy vice mayoralty elections
Party	Candidate	Votes	%
UNA	Roland Masangkay	4,413	51.30
Liberal	Ebet Dumaoal	4,194	48.70
Total votes		8,607	100.00

=== 3rd District ===
- City: Tanauan City
- Municipality: Agoncillo, Alitagtag, Balete, Cuenca, Laurel, Malvar, Mataas na Kahoy, San Nicolas, Santa Teresita, Santo Tomas, Talisay

==== Tanauan City ====
Incumbent mayor Antonio "Thony" Halili is running for a second term under Tanauan City's Hope (TCH) Team which is affiliated with the Nationalist People's Coalition. His opponent is retired Batangas provincial police director David Quimio.

Meanwhile, the local Liberal Party chapter will support Team TCH despite the latter's affiliation with NPC.

Tanauan City mayoralty elections
Party	Candidate	Votes	%
Liberal	Antonio Halili		
PGP	David Quimio		
Total votes			

Incumbent Jhoanna Corona is running for re-election under the TCH Team. Her opponent is perennial council candidate Marcos Valdez Sr.

Tanauan City vice mayoralty elections
Party	Candidate	Votes	%
Liberal	Jhoanna Corona		
PGP	Marcos Valdez Sr.		
Total votes			

==== Agoncillo ====
Incumbent Danilo Reyes is running for reelection.

Agoncillo mayoralty elections
Party	Candidate	Votes	%
UNA	Glorioso Martinez		
Liberal	Danilo Reyes		
Total votes			

Incumbent Domingo Encarnacion is running for reelection.

Agoncillo vice mayoralty elections
Party	Candidate	Votes	%
UNA	Danilo Anuran		
Liberal	Domingo Encarnacion		
Total votes			

==== Alitagtag ====
Incumbent Anthony Francis Andal is running for reelection.

Alitagtag mayoralty elections
Party	Candidate	Votes	%
NPC	Anthony Francis Andal		
Liberal	Bayani Andal		
Total votes			

Alitagtag vice mayoralty elections
Party	Candidate	Votes	%
Liberal	Donald Marasigan		
NPC	Dingdong Ponggos		
Total votes			

==== Balete ====
Balete mayoralty election
Party	Candidate	Votes	%
NPC	Leovino Hidalgo		
Total votes			
NPC hold			

Balete vice mayoralty election
Party	Candidate	Votes	%
Liberal	Wilson Maralit		
Total votes			
Liberal hold			

==== Cuenca ====
Cuenca mayoralty elections
Party	Candidate	Votes	%
Liberal	Celerino Endaya		
PDP–Laban	Alexander Magpantay		
Total votes			

Incumbent Rolando La Rosa is running for reelection.

Cuenca vice mayoralty elections
Party	Candidate	Votes	%
Liberal	Romulo Cuevas		
UNA	Rolando La Rosa		
Total votes			

==== Laurel ====
Incumbent Randy James Amo is running for reelection

Laurel mayoralty elections
Party	Candidate	Votes	%
Liberal	Randy James Amo		
PDP–Laban	Vincent Endaya		
NPC	Roderick Natanauan		
Total votes			

Laurel vice mayoralty elections
Party	Candidate	Votes	%
Liberal	Felimon Austria		
NPC	Cristituto Lamano		
PDP–Laban	Marvin Vergara		
Total votes			

==== Malvar ====
Incumbent Carlito Reyes is not running. His sister-in-law, incumbent Vice Mayor Cristeta Reyes is his party's nominee and is running unopposed.

Malvar mayoralty election
Party	Candidate	Votes	%
Liberal	Cristeta Reyes		
Total votes			
Liberal hold			

Incumbent Cristeta Reyes is running for Mayor. His party nominated incumbent councilor Alberto Lat.

Malvar vice mayoralty elections
Party	Candidate	Votes	%
UNA	Antonio Aranda		
Liberal	Alberto Lat		
Total votes			

==== Mataasnakahoy ====
Incumbent Jay Ilagan is running for reelection. He initially won, however, the second placer, Gualberto Silva assumed the mayorship.

Mataasnakahoy mayoralty elections
Party	Candidate	Votes	%
Liberal	Jay Ilagan		
UNA	Mel Regalado		
NPC	Gual Silva		
Total votes			

Mataasnakahoy vice mayoralty elections
Party	Candidate	Votes	%
UNA	Puto Dimaano		
Liberal	Janet Ilagan		
NPC	Henry Laqui		
Total votes			

==== San Nicolas ====
Incumbent Epifanio Sandoval is term limited and is running for Vice Mayor

San Nicolas mayoralty elections
Party	Candidate	Votes	%
NPC	Napoleon Arceo		
Liberal	Lester De Sagun		
UNA	William Enriquez		
Total votes			

Incumbent Alfonso Biscocho is term limited

San Nicolas vice mayoralty elections
Party	Candidate	Votes	%
Liberal	Lynne Bancoro		
NPC	Alex Biscocho		
UNA	Epifanio Sandoval		
Total votes			

==== Santa Teresita ====
Incumbent Ma. Aurea Segunial is running for reelection.

Santa Teresita mayoralty elections
Party	Candidate	Votes	%
UNA	Adorlito Ginete		
Liberal	Ma. Aurea Segunial		
Total votes			

Incumbent Carlos Bathan is running for reelection

Santa Teresita vice mayoralty elections
Party	Candidate	Votes	%
UNA	Charlito Arriola		
Liberal	Carlos Bathan		
Total votes			

==== Santo Tomas ====
Incumbent Edna Sanchez is running for reelection.

Santo Tomas mayoralty elections
Party	Candidate	Votes	%
Liberal	Osmundo Maligaya		
UNA	Edna Sanchez		
Total votes			

Incumbent Ferdinand Ramos is running for reelection.

Santo Tomas vice mayoralty elections
Party	Candidate	Votes	%
Liberal	Ferdinand Ramos		
UNA	Armenius Silva		
Total votes			

==== Talisay ====
Talisay is the only municipality in the country where in the elections, the incumbent Mayor, Vice Mayor and all eight councilors are running without any opposing parties.

Talisay mayoralty election
Party	Candidate	Votes	%
Liberal	Gerry Natanauan		
Total votes			
Liberal hold			

Talisay vice mayoralty election
Party	Candidate	Votes	%
Liberal	Allan Lamano		
Total votes			
Liberal hold			

=== 4th District ===
- Municipality: Ibaan, Padre Garcia, Rosario, San Jose, San Juan, Taysan

==== Ibaan ====
Incumbent Mayor Juan Toreja is running for reelection. His opponent is former mayor Remigio Hernandez.

Ibaan mayoralty elections
Party	Candidate	Votes	%
Lakas	Remigio Hernandez		
Liberal	Juan Toreja		
Total votes			

Incumbent Sixto Yabyabin is running for reelection.

Ibaan vice mayoralty elections
Party	Candidate	Votes	%
Lakas	Joy Salvame		
Liberal	Sixto Yabyabin		
Total votes			

==== Padre Garcia ====
Incumbent Abraham Gutierrez is running for reelection. His opponent is 1-CARE Party-list representative Michael Angelo Rivera.

Padre Garcia mayoralty elections
Party	Candidate	Votes	%
NPC	Abraham Gutierrez		
Liberal	Michael Angelo Rivera		
Total votes			

Incumbent Noel Cantos is running for reelection.

Padre Garcia mayoralty elections
Party	Candidate	Votes	%
Liberal	Noel Cantos		
NPC	Melvin Vidal		
Total votes			

==== Rosario ====
Incumbent Manuel Alvarez is running for reelection.

Rosario mayoralty elections
Party	Candidate	Votes	%
Liberal	Edward Aguilar		
UNA	Manuel Alvarez		
Total votes			

Incumbent Jose Valencia is not running.

Rosario vice mayoralty elections
Party	Candidate	Votes	%
Lakas	Manuel Maranan		
Liberal	Leovigildo Morpe		
UNA	Rodolfo Villar		
Total votes			

==== San Jose ====
Incumbent Entiquio Briones is running for Vice Mayor.

San Jose mayoralty elections
Party	Candidate	Votes	%
Liberal	Valentino Patron		
UNA	Melvin Requiño		
Total votes			

Incumbent Valentino Patron is running for Mayor

San Jose vice mayoralty elections
Party	Candidate	Votes	%
NPC	Jose Nereus Agbing		
PDP–Laban	Entiquio Briones		
Total votes			

==== San Juan ====
Incumbent Mayor Rodolfo Manalo is running for reelection. His opponents are former Mayor Danilo Mindanao and Nowell Ona.

San Juan mayoralty elections
Party	Candidate	Votes	%
Liberal	Rodolfo Manalo		
PDP–Laban	Danilo Mindanao		
UNA	Nowell Ona		
Total votes			

Incumbent Octavio Antonio Marasigan is term limited. His party nominated incumbent Councilor Ildebrando Salud. His opponent is incumbent councilor Meynard Robles.

San Juan vice mayoralty elections
Party	Candidate	Votes	%
UNA	Meynard Robles		
Liberal	Ildebrando Salud		
Total votes			

==== Taysan ====
Incumbent Victor Portugal, Jr. is term limited and is running for Congress. His brother, incumbent Councilor Joel Portugal is his party's nominee. His opponent is incumbent Vice Mayor Grande Gutierrez.

Taysan mayoralty elections
Party	Candidate	Votes	%
Liberal	Grande Gutierrez		
NPC	Joel Portugal		
Total votes			

Incumbent Grande Gutierrez is term limited and is running for Mayor.

Taysan vice mayoralty elections
Party	Candidate	Votes	%
NPC	Clint Bosch		
Liberal	Marianito Perez		
Total votes			

=== 5th District ===
- City: Batangas City

==== Batangas City ====
Incumbent Mayor Eduardo Dimacuha is running for reelection. His opponent is incumbent councilor Kristine Gonda Balmes, incidentally his former daughter-in-law. On December 10, Dimacuha withdrew his candidacy. His daughter Beverley Rose Dimacuha substituted him.

Batangas City mayoralty elections
Party	Candidate	Votes	%
PDP–Laban	Kristine Balmes		
Liberal	Beverley Rose Dimacuha		
Total votes			

Incumbent Vice Mayor Emilio "Jun" Berberabe is running unopposed. He is Balmes' running mate.

Batangas City Vice Mayoralty Election
Party	Candidate	Votes	%
UNA	Emilio Berberabe Jr.		
Total votes			

=== 6th District ===
- City: Lipa City

==== Lipa City ====
Incumbent Mayor Meynardo Sabili is running for reelection. His opponent is fiscal Edgardo Mendoza. Sabili is running under the National Unity Party, however the party withdrew Sabili's nomination thus, he is running as an independent.

Lipa City mayoralty elections
Party	Candidate	Votes	%
Liberal	Edgardo Mendoza		
UNA	Meynardo Sabili		
Total votes			

Incumbent Eric Africa is running for reelection. His opponent is incumbent councilor Raul Montealto.

Lipa City vice mayoralty elections
Party	Candidate	Votes	%
Liberal	Eric Africa		
NPC	Raul Montealto		
Total votes			
