= Batangas Provincial Board =

Legislative body of the Philippine province

Batangas Provincial Board Sangguniang Panlalawigan ng Batangas

Type
- Type: Unicameral
- Term limits: 3 terms (9 years)

Leadership
- Presiding Officer: Hermilando I. Mandanas (PDP-Laban) since June 30, 2025
- Senior Board Member: Emilio Francisco A. Berberabe Jr. (Nacionalista) since June 30, 2025

Structure
- Seats: 15 board members 1 ex officio presiding officer
- Political groups: Nacionalista (10) Independent (1) NPC (1) PFP (1) Nonpartisan (2)
- Length of term: 3 years
- Authority: Local Government Code of the Philippines

Elections
- Voting system: Plurality-at-large (regular members); Indirect election (ex officio members)
- Last election: May 12, 2025

Meeting place
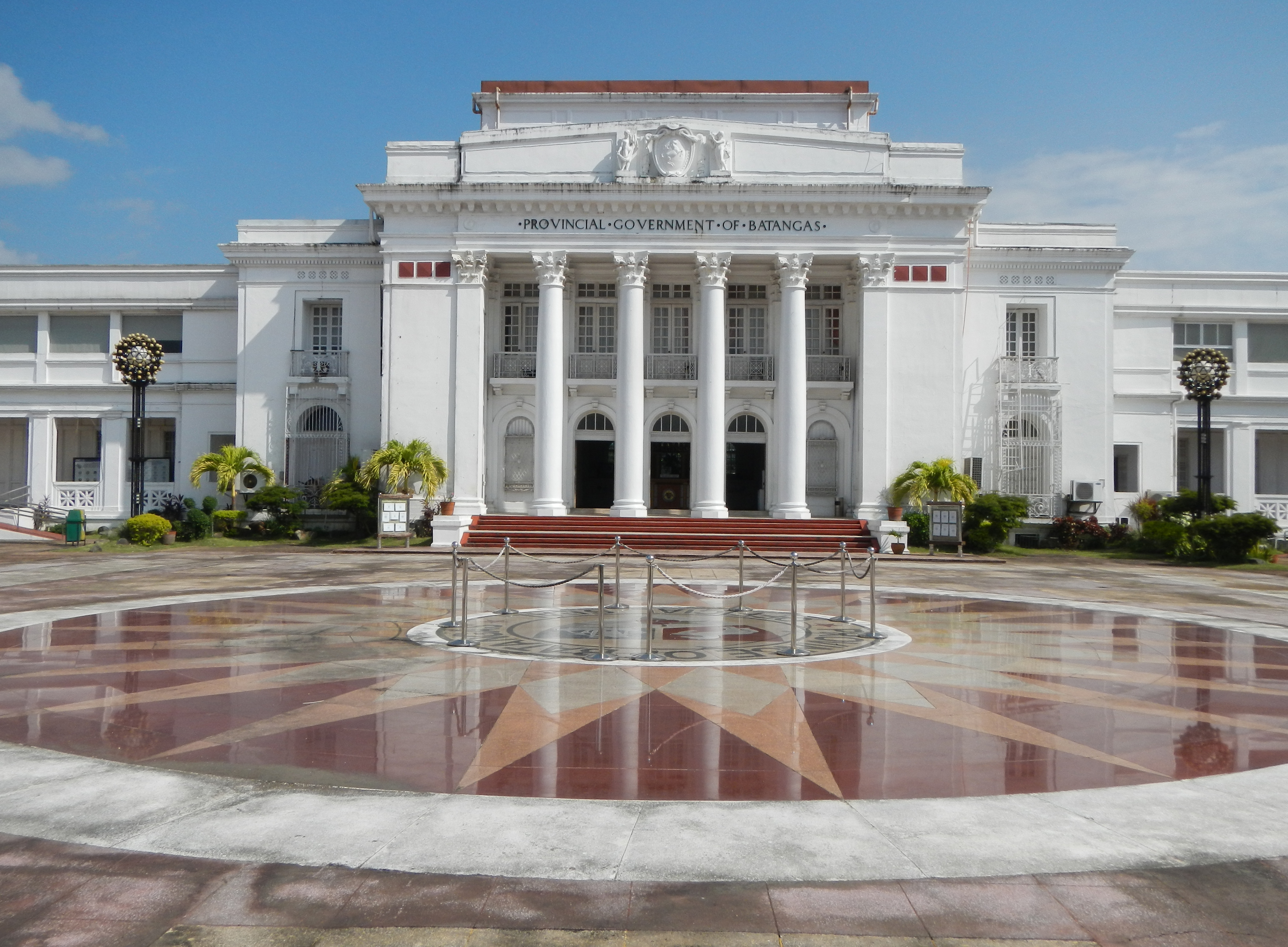
- Apolinario Mabini Legislative Building, Batangas Provincial Capitol Compound, Batangas City

The Batangas Provincial Board is the Sangguniang Panlalawigan (provincial legislature) of the Philippine province of Batangas.

The members are elected via plurality-at-large voting: the province is divided into six districts, two representatives in each district. The candidates with the highest number of votes in each district, depending on the number of members the district sends, are elected. The vice governor is the ex officio presiding officer, and only votes to break ties. The vice governor is elected via the plurality voting system province-wide.

The districts used in appropriation of members is coextensive with the legislative districts of Batangas.

The 2025 session was viewed as contentious by multiple media outlets. This led to a legislative impasse.

== District apportionment ==
Elections	No. of seats per district						Ex officio seats	Total seats
Elections	1st	2nd	3rd	4th	5th	6th	Ex officio seats	Total seats
2001–13	2	3	2	3	—	—	3	13
2016	2	2	2	2	2	2	2	15
2018–present	2	2	2	2	2	2	3	16

== List of members ==
The senior board member is a board member who gets the highest vote in the latest election, he will be the temporary presiding officer if the vice governor is unable to attend the session or appoint as an acting governor. Also he will become a vice governor if the position become vacant.

An additional three ex officio members are the presidents of the provincial chapters of the Association of Barangay Captains, the Councilors' League, the Sangguniang Kabataan provincial president; the municipal and city (if applicable) presidents of the Association of Barangay Captains, Councilor's League and Sangguniang Kabataan, shall elect amongst themselves their provincial presidents which shall be their representatives at the board.

=== Current members ===
As of 2025, the Biards consists of the following:

- Vice Governor: Hermilando Mandanas (PDP-Laban; from June 30, 2025)
- Senior Board Member: Emilio Francisco A. Berberabe Jr. (Nacionalista); from June 30, 2025

Seat	Board member	Party	Term number	Start of term	End of term
1st district	Anna Coretta R. Santos	Nacionalista	1	June 30, 2025	June 30, 2028
1st district	Armie Marie C. Bausas	Nacionalista	2	June 30, 2022	June 30, 2028
2nd district	Maria Reina D. Abu-Reyes	Nacionalista	1	June 30, 2025	June 30, 2028
2nd district	Jently O. Rivera	Nacionalista	1	June 30, 2025	June 30, 2028
3rd district	Alfredo C. Corona	Nacionalista	2	June 30, 2022	June 30, 2028
3rd district	Rodolfo M. Balba	Nacionalista	3	June 30, 2019	June 30, 2028
4th district	Marcus Dominic S. Mendoza	NPC	1	June 30, 2025	June 30, 2028
4th district	Melvin V. Vidal	Independent	1	June 30, 2025	June 30, 2028
5th district	Emilio Francisco A. Berberabe Jr.	Nacionalista	1	June 30, 2025	June 30, 2028
5th district	Hamilton G. Blanco	Nacionalista	1	June 30, 2025	June 30, 2028
6th district	Aries Emmanuel D. Mendoza	Nacionalista	3	June 30, 2019	June 30, 2028
6th district	Oscar M. Gozos II	Nacionalista	1	June 30, 2025	June 30, 2028
ABC	Fernando R. Rocafort	Nonpartisan	1	January 2024	January 2026
PCL	Kathleen C. Briones	PFP	1	June 30, 2025	June 30, 2028
SK	Voltaire Aedrian P. Pua	Nonpartisan	1	November 30, 2023	January 2026

=== Membership summary ===
Election year	VG	ABC	PCL	SK	1	2	3	4	5	6	7	8	9	10	11	12	Controlling party
2004			?												—	—	No majority
2007														?	—	—	No majority
2010															—	—	No majority
2013				—^{1}											—	—	Liberal
2016				—^{1}													Liberal
2018																	Liberal
2019																	Nacionalista
2022																	Nacionalista
2025																	Nacionalista

^1The term of elected officials of the Sangguniang Kabataan elected in 2010 expired on November 30, 2013, and were not replaced.

=== Vice Governor ===
Election year	Name	Party
1992	Ma. Guia Perez-Chavez	
1995	Ricky Recto	
1998	Ricky Recto	
2001	Peter Laurel	
2004	Ricky Recto	Lakas
2007	Mark Leviste	KAMPI
2010	Mark Leviste	Liberal
2013	Mark Leviste	Liberal
2016	Sofronio Ona Jr	NPC
2019	Mark Leviste	PDP–Laban
2022	Mark Leviste	PDP–Laban
2025	Hermilando Mandanas	PDP–Laban

=== 1st District ===
- City: Calaca
- Municipalities: Balayan, Calatagan, Lemery, Lian, Nasugbu, Taal, Tuy
- Population (2020): 635,962

Election year	Member (party)	Member (party)
2004	Consuelo Malabanan (Lakas)	Benjamin Bausas (LDP)
2007	Roman Rosales (KAMPI)	Benjamin Bausas (Lakas)
2010	Roman Rosales (Lakas-Kampi)	Lorenzo Bausas (Liberal)
2013	Roman Rosales (Liberal)	Ramon Bausas (Liberal)
2016	Carlo Roman Rosales (Independent)	Ramon Bausas (Liberal)
2019	Carlo Roman Rosales (Nacionalista)	Glenda Bausas (Nacionalista)
2022	Carlo Roman Rosales (Nacionalista)	Armie Marie Bausas (Nacionalista)
2025	Anna Coretta R. Santos (Nacionalista)	Armie Marie Bausas (Nacionalista)

=== 2nd District ===
- Municipalities: Bauan, Lobo, Mabini, San Luis, San Pascual, Tingloy
- Population (2020): 306,809

Election year	Member (party)	Member (party)	Member (party)
2004	Sergio Atienza (Liberal)	Godofredo Berberabe Jr. (Liberal)	Florencio Loyola (Liberal)
2007	Joel Atienza (KAMPI)	Godofredo Berberabe Jr. (KAMPI)	Florencio Loyola (KAMPI)
2010	Joel Atienza (Lakas-Kampi)	Christopher De Leon (Liberal)	Florencio Loyola (Lakas-Kampi)
2013	Marvey Mariño (NPC)	Dexter Buted (Liberal)	Amelia Alvarez (Liberal)
2016	Wilson Leonardo Rivera (UNA)	Arlina Magboo (Independent)	—N/a
2019	Wilson Leonardo Rivera (Nacionalista)	Arlina Magboo (Nacionalista)	—N/a
2022	Wilson Leonardo Rivera (Nacionalista)	Arlina Magboo (Aksyon)	—N/a
2025	Maria Reina D. Abu-Reyes (Nacionalista)	Jently O. Rivera (Nacionalista)	—N/a

=== 3rd District ===
- Cities: Santo Tomas, Tanauan
- Municipalities: Agoncillo, Alitagtag, Balete, Cuenca, Laurel, Malvar, Mataasnakahoy, San Nicolas, Santa Teresita, Talisay
- Population (2020): 768,561

Election year	Member (party)	Member (party)
2001	Santillan (NPC)	Rudy Balba (Lakas)
2004	Rudy Balba (Lakas)	Cecilio Hernandez (Lakas)
2007	Rudy Balba (KAMPI)	Chona Dimayuga (Lakas)
2010	Devs Balba (Liberal)	Alfredo Corona (Lakas-Kampi)
2013	Devs Balba (Liberal)	Alfredo Corona (Liberal)
2016	Devs Balba (Liberal)	Alfredo Corona (Liberal)
2019	Jhoanna Corona-Villamor (Nacionalista)	Rodolfo M. Balba (Nacionalista)
2022	Alfredo C. Corona (NPC)	Rodolfo M. Balba (Nacionalista)
2025	Alfredo C. Corona (Nacionalista)	Rodolfo M. Balba (Nacionalista)

=== 4th District ===
- Municipalities: Ibaan, Padre Garcia, Rosario, San Jose, San Juan, Taysan
- Population (2020): 472,794

Election year	Member (party)	Member (party)	Member (party)
2004	Mark Leviste (Lakas)	Rowena Africa (Independent)	Lianda Bolilia (Lakas)
2007	Mabelle Virtusio (Lakas)	Marieta Igarta	Amado Carlos Bolilia IV (Lakas)
2010	Mabelle Virtusio (Liberal)	Rowena Africa (Nacionalista)	Amado Carlos Bolilia IV (Liberal)
2013	Mabelle Virtusio (Liberal)	Rowena Africa (Liberal)	Amado Carlos Bolilia IV (Liberal)
2016	Jonas Patrick Gozos (Liberal)	Jesus De Veyra (Liberal)	—N/a
2019	Jonas Patrick Gozos (Nacionalista)	Jesus De Veyra (Nacionalista)	—N/a
2022	Jonas Patrick Gozos (Nacionalista)	Jesus De Veyra (Nacionalista)	—N/a
2025	Marcus Dominic S. Mendoza (NPC)	Melvin V. Vidal (Independent)	—N/a

=== 5th District ===
- City: Batangas City
- Population (2020): 351,437

Election year	Member (party)	Member (party)
2016	Ma. Claudette Ambida (Liberal)	Arthur Blanco (Liberal)
2019	Ma. Claudette Ambida (Nacionalista)	Arthur Blanco (Nacionalista)
2022	Ma. Claudette Ambida (Nacionalista)	Arthur Blanco (Nacionalista)
2025	Emilio Francisco A. Berberabe Jr (Nacionalista)	Hamilton G. Blanco (Nacionalista)

=== 6th District ===
- City: Lipa
- Population (2020): 372,931

Election year	Member (party)	Member (party)
2016	Rowena Africa (Liberal)	Lydio Lopez Jr. (Liberal)
2019	Lydio Lopez Jr. (Nacionalista)	Aries Emmanuel Mendoza (Nacionalista)
2022	Lydio Lopez Jr. (Nacionalista)	Aries Emmanuel Mendoza (Nacionalista)
2025	Aries Emmanuel D. Mendoza (Nacionalista)	Oscar M. Gozos II (Nacionalista)

=== Philippine Councilors League President ===
Election year	Member (party)
2001	Victor Portugal Jr. (Lakas) (Taysan)
2004	Victor Portugal Jr. (Lakas) (Taysan)
2007	Joel Portugal (Lakas) (Taysan)
2010	Joel Portugal (NPC) (Taysan)
2013	Kathleen Briones (Liberal) (Lipa)
2016	Mildred Sanchez (Liberal) (Nasugbu)
2019	Leo Malinay (Nacionalista) (Lian)
2020	Ronald Cruzat (Nacionalista) (Bauan)
2022	Oliver Macatangay (Nacionalista) (Batangas City) (Interim)
2022	Melvin Vidal (Nacionalista) (Padre Garcia)
2025	Venice Manalo (Nacionalista) (Lipa) (Interim)
2025	Kathleen Briones (PFP) (San Jose)

=== Association of Barangay Captains President ===
Election year	Member (party)
2013	Herminigildo Dolor
2016	Wilfredo Maliksi
2023	Medel Medrano
2024	Fernando Rocafort

=== Sangguniang Kabataan President ===
Election year	Member (city/town)
1996	Mabelle Virtusio (Rosario)
2002	Jayvee Bendaña (Lemery)
2007	Melody Ellaine Amante (Padre Garcia)
2010	Mark Lawrence Alvarez (Tingloy)
2018	Hannah Beatriz Cabral (Lemery)
2019	Maria Louise Gamo-Vale (San Luis)
2023	Voltaire Aedrian Pua (Lipa City)
