= Saint Joseph the Patriarch Church (Batangas) =

Roman Catholic church in Batangas, Philippines

- Archdiocesan Shrine and Parish of Saint Joseph the Patriarch
- Pang-Arsidiyosesis na Dambana ng San Jose ang Patriyarka (Filipino)
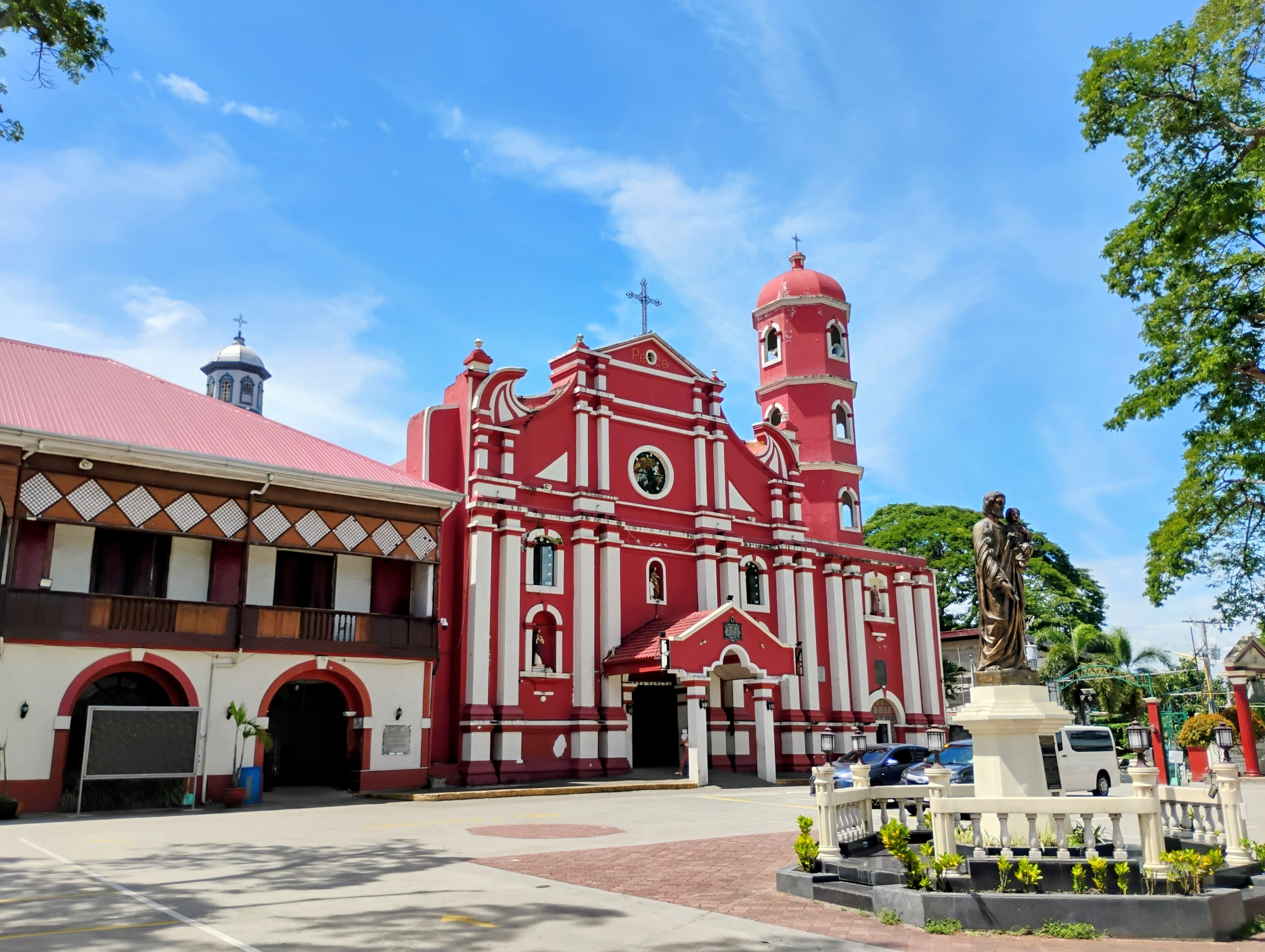
- The church in June 2025

- Location in Luzon Location in the Philippines
- 13°52′47″N 121°06′15″E
- Location: San Jose, Batangas
- Country: Philippines
- Denomination: Roman Catholic
- Religious institute: Oblates of St. Joseph

History
- Status: Archdiocesan Shrine; Parish church
- Founded: 1765
- Dedication: Saint Joseph

Architecture
- Functional status: Active
- Architectural type: Church building
- Style: Baroque and Neo-Classical
- Groundbreaking: 1812
- Completed: 1816

Specifications
- Length: 60 metres (200 ft)
- Width: 14 metres (46 ft)
- Materials: Adobe, Wood, Galvanized Iron

Administration
- Archdiocese: Lipa
- Deanery: Saint Joseph the Patriarch
- Parish: Saint Joseph the Patriarch

Clergy
- Priest(s): Fr. Arnold C. Rosal, OSJ

The Archdiocesan Shrine and Parish of Saint Joseph the Patriarch, also known as Saint Joseph the Patriarch Church, is a Roman Catholic church located in the town center of San Jose, Batangas, in the Philippines. It is under the jurisdiction of the Archdiocese of Lipa. The church is known for being one of the parishes that Fr. Manuel Blanco OSA, who authored the Flora de Filipinas, administered.

== History ==
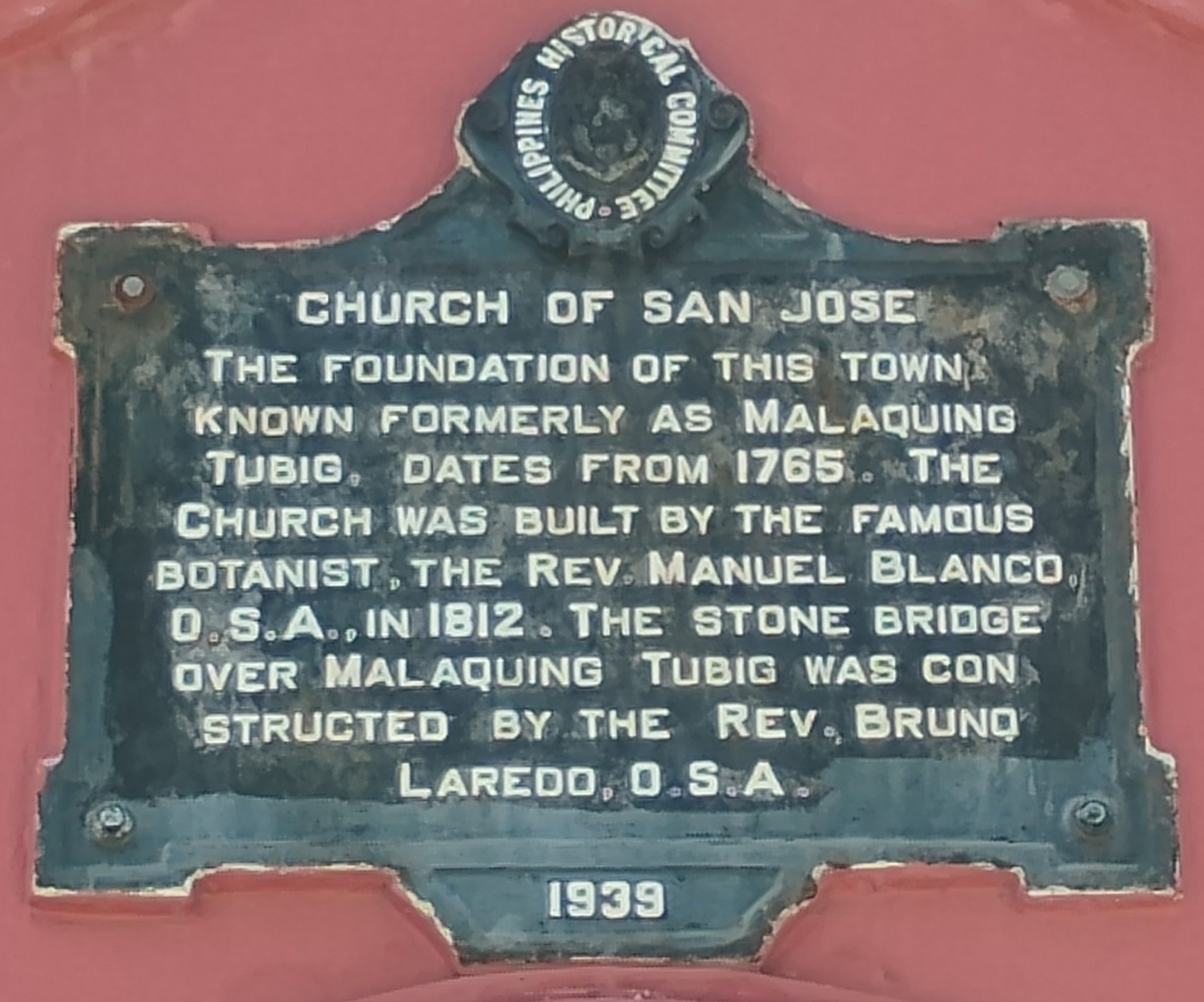
Church PHC historical marker installed in 1939

Fr. Jose Victoria built the church in 1762. The Augustinian Chapter of May 9, 1767, named Fr. Agustin Horbegozo as the town's parish priest. Fr. Tomas Cañón replaced the old structure with one made of lime and pebbles. In 1790, the archbishop of Manila ordered the parish church of Batangas to give one of its old, dismantled retablos to San Jose. Fr. Manuel Blanco in 1812 replaced the original buildings with new ones made of masonry, he constructed the convento and began the work on the present church, but left in 1816 without seeing it completed. The church roof went up in flames in 1847 and was changed to tile in 1849 by Fray Marcos Anton. A fire damaged both the church and convento in 1857. While the church underwent repairs, a new convento had to be built. Fr. Ramon Sanchez took over the parish in 1856 and continued the restoration work on the church. With the completion of the convent and tower, he also added a baptistery to the church in 1868; that was fitted with a marble font in 1878. Fray Bruno Laredo (1870–1884) improved both church and convent, rebuilding the bamboo sacristy in stone, and commencing the work on the transept. During the term of Fr. Vicente Maril (1884–1887), the roof of the church was replaced by galvanized iron. Fr. Victoriano Perez (1890 to 1896) restored the L-shaped convent and completed works on the transept and dome.

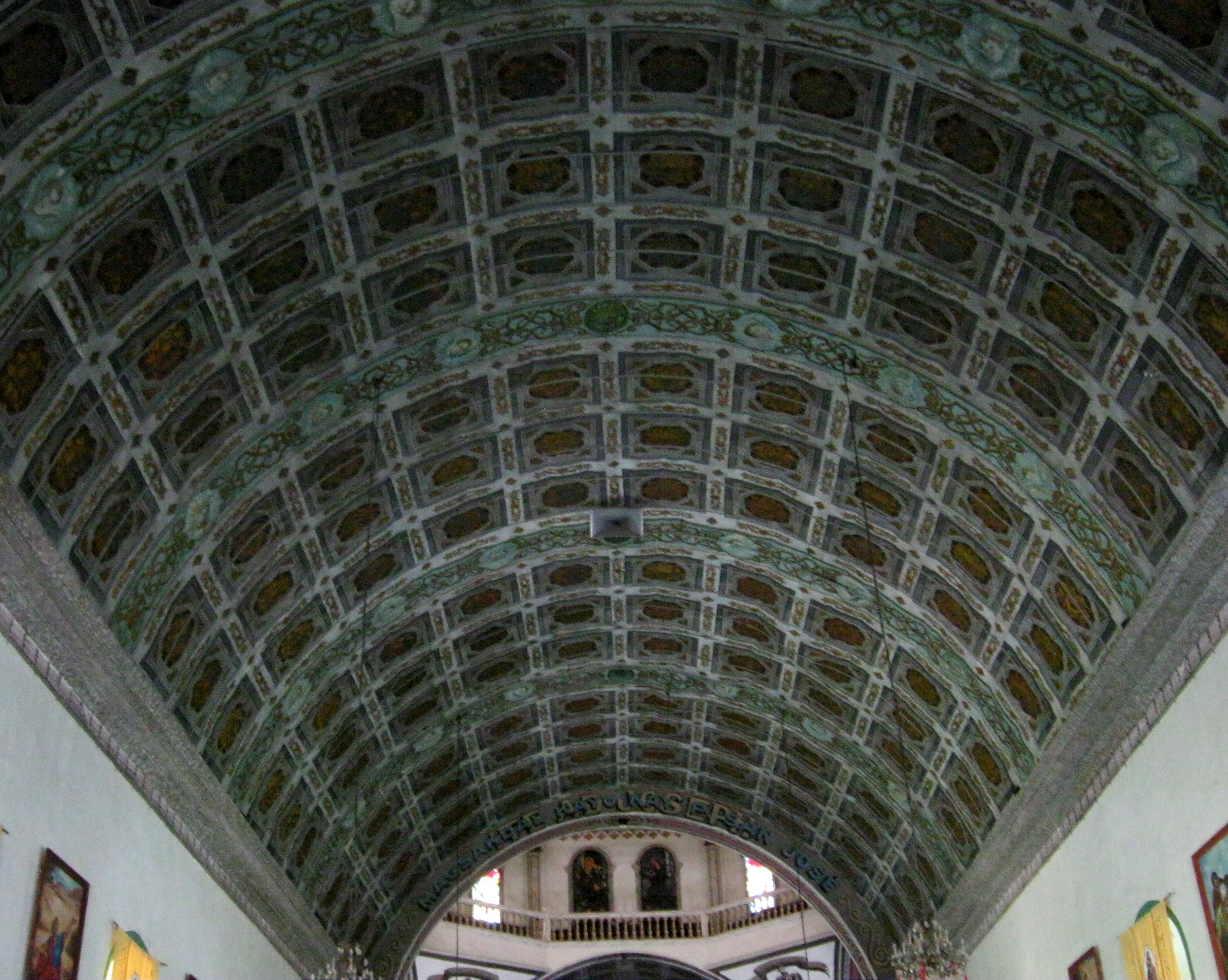
Ceiling of the church

The 1898 revolution expelled the Spanish friars from the Philippines, and the last Spanish priest of the parish was Fray Manuel de Arostegui of the Order of Saint Augustine, whose last entry on the Book of Baptism is dated May 28, 1898. He was replaced by Fr. Vicente Jose Romero, who became the parish priest of the town.

On April 1, 1899, the Filipino secular priest Juan Gernonimo Luna, a native of San Jose, was appointed parish priest. In 1900, American troops occupied the convento and converted it into a military hospital for some time. In 1911, there were no more Filipino priests available in San Jose; hence, a Capuchin friar was called to administer the parish. From July 1911 to 1915, the Missionaries of the Sacred Heart stayed in San Jose, where they set up a small major seminary. The seminary was short-lived, for the Missionaries of the Sacred Heart left the diocese in 1915. In 1915, Bishop Giuseppe Petrelli invited the Oblates of St. Joseph. The first Oblates arrived in Manila by ship on August 25, 1915, and took the train to San Jose, where they were welcomed with the prolonged ringing of bells. Since then, they have been in charge of the parish of San Jose. Fr. Jose Anfossi became the parish priest, with the responsibility also for Cuenca, until his death in August 1921. Fr. Eugenio Gherlone immediately began the reconstruction of the church. His successor, Fr. Luis Mortera, finished the reconstruction of the church, which was beautified by paintings of St. Joseph. Fr. Luis was also responsible for setting up the communion rails and lowering the windows for better light and ventilation.

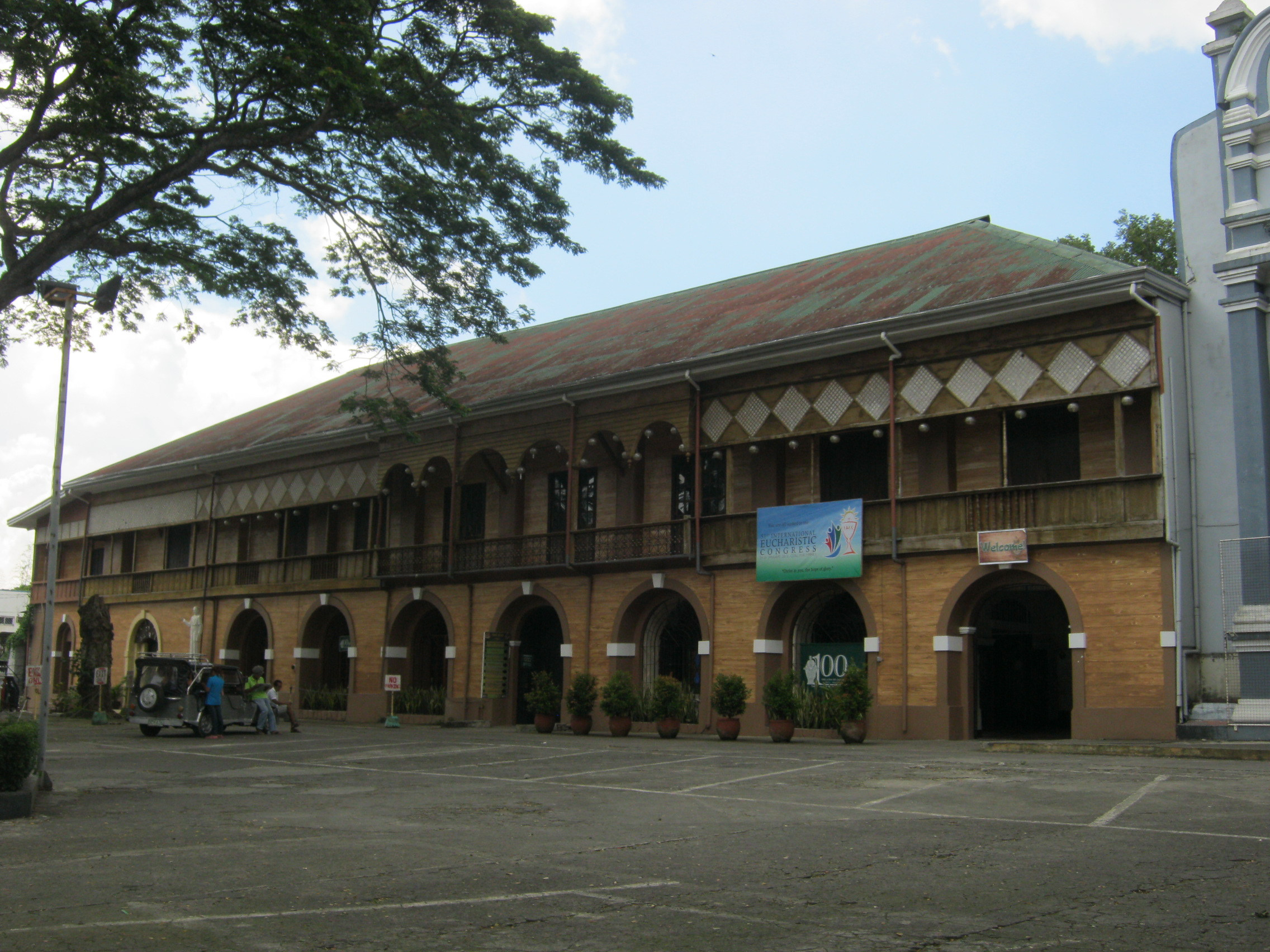
The parish convent

In 1968, Fr. Lucio Aguilar and his parochial vicar, Fr. Raymundo G. de la Cruz, began a major reconstruction. The leaking roof was repaired, the windows lowered for more ventilation, the altar area and communion rails redecorated, and new murals painted. This was concluded by a blessing on April 26, 1970.

In 2000, the parish retook possession of the convent, which had long been used by the Cursillo movement as a venue for its retreats. Fr. Rony Alkonga OSJ began the much-needed repair on the roof and ceiling, as well as a redesign of the area to accommodate, among others, a parish museum. The church was beautified. The adoration chapel and Jubilee stage were constructed. The altars were restored, and additional murals were painted.

The Church experienced renovations on its ceiling and the retablo of the main altar, which the former Parish Priest, Rev. Fr. Servando Sentales, initiated during his term. The newly renovated ceiling and altar were blessed by Rev. Fr. Arnold C. Rosal, Rev. Fr. Servando Sentales, and His Excellency Most Rev. Gilbert A. Garcera, D.D. on August 25, 2025.

On March 19, 2001, during the term of Rev. Fr. Joey Apin OSJ as parish priest, the church of San Jose was proclaimed by Archbishop Gaudencio Rosales as an archdiocesan shrine.

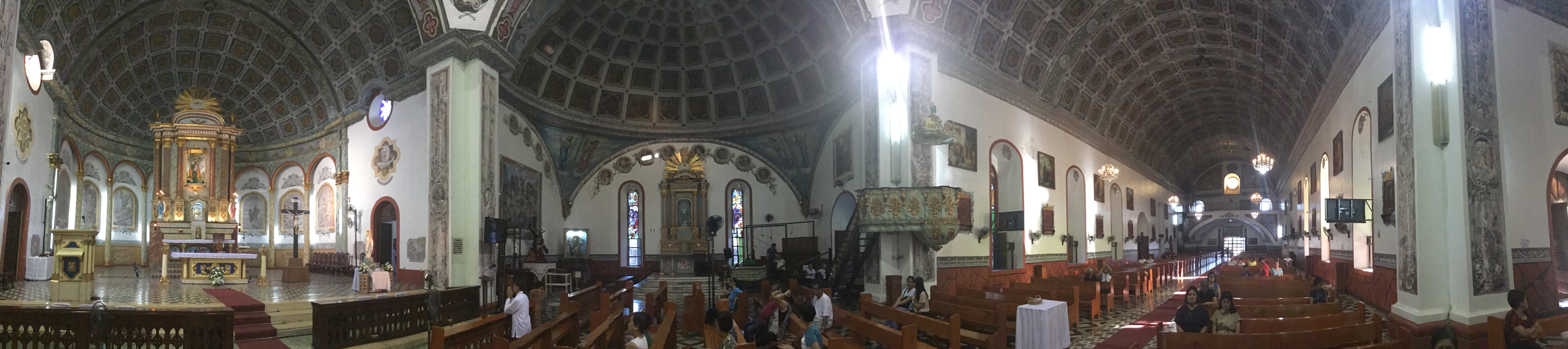
Church interior panorama

In 2021, during the incumbency of Rev. Fr. Edwin Tolentino, OSJ as Parish Priest --and coincidentally the Year of St. Joseph and the 500th anniversary of Christianity in the Philippines-- a parish archive was completed on the ground floor of the old convent building adjacent to the church. Named Archivo de San Jose de Malaquing Tubig after the name of the town and the parish on their founding in 1767, the archive was inaugurated and blessed by His Excellency Gilbert A. Garcera, Archbishop of Lipa, on March 19, 2022, feast day of St. Joseph.

Archivo de SJ de MT, the first and only parish archive in the country, was established to store in physically and environmentally safe conditions the baptismal, matrimonial, and burial records of the church which date back to the parish’s founding in 1767, as well as hundreds of pages of Ecclesiastical Decrees (Decretos Eclesiasticos) and inventory lists of church properties (Libros de Inventario) dating back to the 1860s, and an 1886 ecclesiastical census of the parish. It is believed that these archival documents are among the few surviving sets of Filipino parish records of that age. [As a footnote, one of the few, if not the only, extant signatures of Fr. Jose Burgos (of the Gomburza fame) is on one of the Libros de Inventario kept in the archive.]

The National Commission for Culture and Arts, De La Salle University History Department and Archivo de Universidad de Sto Tomas were among the institutions who assisted the parish in the establishment of the archive.
