= Ibaan =

Municipality in Batangas, Philippines

- Municipality
- Municipality of Ibaan
- Saint James the Greater Parish Church Ibaan Municipal Hall Ibaan Town Proper

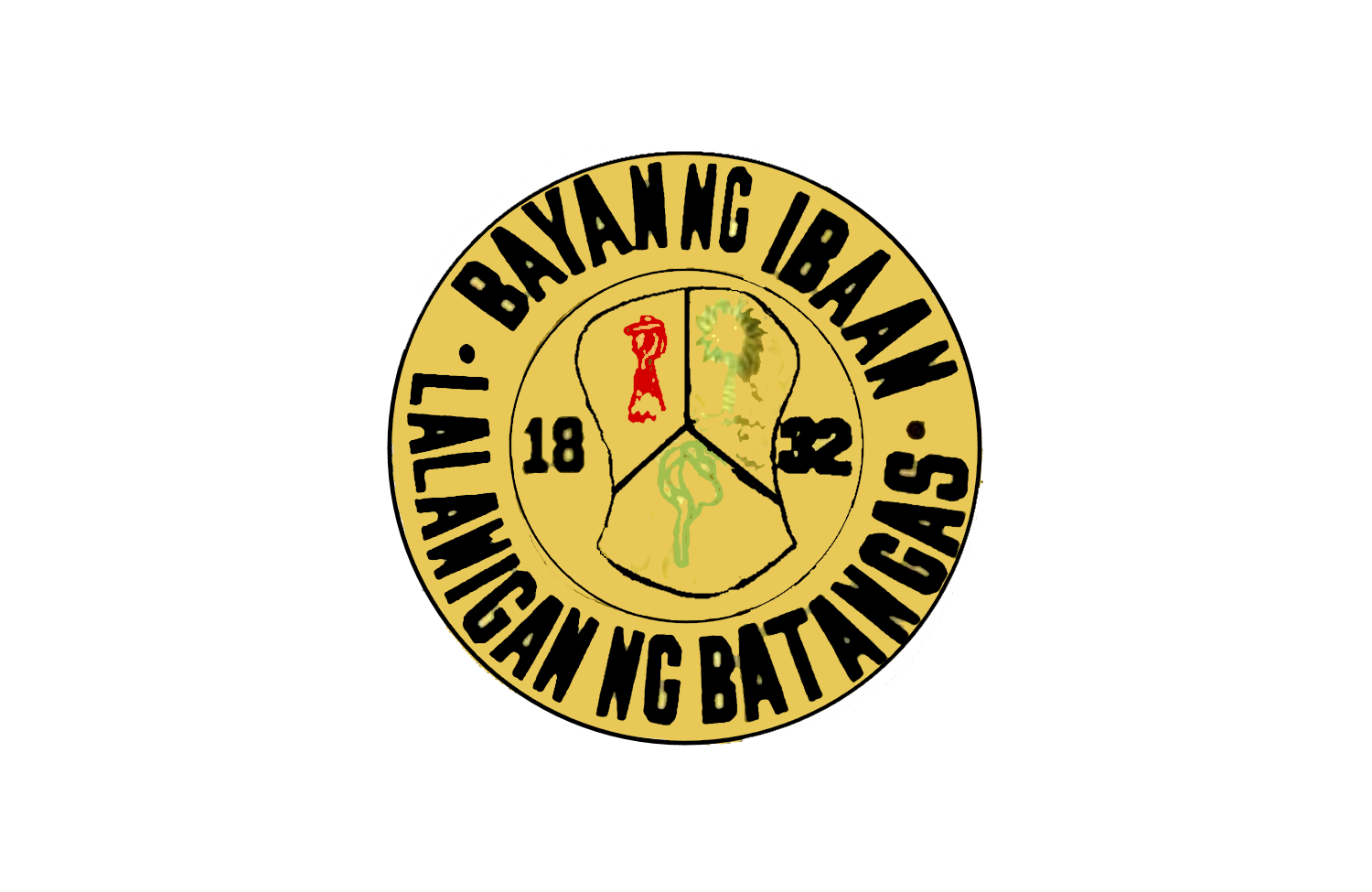
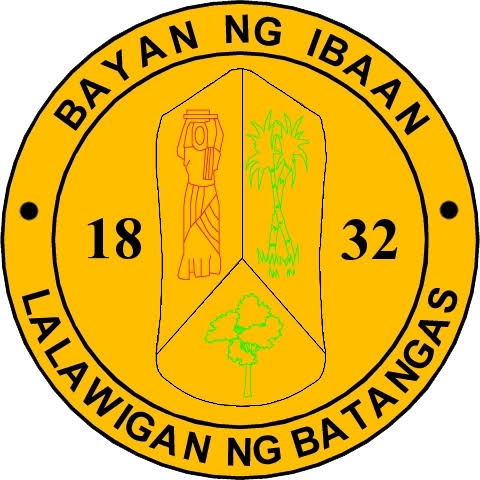
- Flag Seal
- Nickname: Kulambo Capital of the Philippines
- Map of Batangas with Ibaan highlighted
- Interactive map of Ibaan
- Location within the Philippines
- Coordinates: 13°49′03″N 121°07′59″E
- Country: Philippines
- Region: Calabarzon
- Province: Batangas
- District: 4th district
- Founded: February 11, 1832
- Barangays: 26 (see Barangays)

Government
  - Type: Sangguniang Bayan
  - Mayor: Jane A. Casas
  - Vice Mayor: Edralyn Joy A. Salvame
  - Representative: Amado Carlos A. Bolilia IV
  - Municipal Council: Members: Juvy M. Mendoza; John Henry N. Cabatay; Erwin C. Andal; Eloise Jan S. Tejada; Sixto I. Yabyabin; Arsenio A. Ricero; Eddie L. Pasia; Phill Joshua G. Caringal
  - Electorate: 41,301 voters (2025)

Area
  - Total: 68.99 km^{2} (26.64 sq mi)
- Elevation: 178 m (584 ft)
- Highest elevation: 947 m (3,107 ft)
- Lowest elevation: 5 m (16 ft)

Population (2024 census)
  - Total: 58,673
  - Density: 850.5/km^{2} (2,203/sq mi)
  - Households: 14,837

Economy
  - Income class: 1st municipal income class
  - Revenue: ₱ 295.1 million (2024)
  - Assets: ₱ 613.8 million (2024)
  - Expenditure: ₱ 141.5 million (2024)
  - Liabilities: ₱ 118.3 million (2024)

Service provider
  - Electricity: Ibaan Electric and Engineering Corporation (IEEC)
- Time zone: UTC+8 (PST)
- ZIP code: 4230
- PSGC: 0401010000
- IDD : area code: +63 (0)43
- Native languages: Tagalog
- Website: www.ibaan.gov.ph

Ibaan, officially the Municipality of Ibaan (Tagalog: Bayan ng Ibaan), is a municipality in the province of Batangas, Philippines. According to the 2024 census, it has a population of 58,673 people.

The town is known as the home of the "kulambo" (mosquito net), as its production and trading has become one of the most profitable businesses in the locality. Also known for its tamales that are wrapped in banana leaves.

== Etymology ==
Ibaan is derived from a Tagalog word which means "the town where Iba flourishes." According to historians, the present-day municipality was greatly forested with Iba trees (Averrhoa bilimbi).

== History ==
Once part of the former town of Batangas. Its present-day barangay Matala was the first municipal seat (poblacion) of Batangas beginning in 1780. Ibaan was established as a distinct town on February 11, 1832.

=== Pre-colonial and early settlement ===
Before the arrival of Spanish missionaries and colonizers, the area that would become Ibaan was a dense tropical forest, populated only sparsely by early Tagalog-speaking communities. By approximately 1747, settlers began arriving at a place that would become known as Matala, situated roughly four kilometers from where the modern Poblacion of Ibaan stands today. The first recorded gobernadorcillos of the early settlement were Don Francisco de Mercado and Don Anacleto Montalbo, who held their positions from approximately 1747 to 1751.

In 1784, a small chapel was constructed in Matala so that Catholic friars could bring religious services to the growing community. In 1801, the convent at Matala was destroyed by fire. In 1805, the town was struck by a severe locust infestation that devastated agricultural production, causing a famine so acute that a cavan of rice rose from one peso to four pesos.

=== Spanish colonial era ===
==== Founding as a municipality ====
In 1816, a proposal to build a new church at the current Poblacion site was initially opposed but succeeded the following year. In 1817, construction of the present church began. In 1827, a provisional church was completed and blessed, and the seat of government was formally transferred from Matala to the present Poblacion.

Ibaan was officially separated from the municipality of Batangas on February 11, 1832, establishing itself as a distinct municipality with its own principalia. The first gobernadorcillo was Don Bernardo Rafael. Historical records preserved at the National Library of the Philippines contain the names of over sixty holders of this office across the 19th century.

==== The Spanish system of visitation ====
Throughout the Spanish colonial era, every municipality in Batangas — including Ibaan — was subject to official inspections by royally appointed officials called visitadores (inspectors). These officials visited towns, often unannounced, to assess the administration of justice, public works, fiscal management, and civic life, reporting directly to the Council of the Indies in Madrid. Such inspections occurred not once but multiple times throughout the colonial period.

In addition to the political visitadores, the Augustinian friars who administered the parishes of Batangas conducted regular ecclesiastical visitations of their own. A surviving example is the 1845 Augustinian document covering Ibaan alongside the towns of Taal, Bauan, Batangas, San Jose, Lipa, and Tanauan, recording the state of each parish, number of parishioners, condition of the church, and the work of the clergy.

==== Church history ====
The permanent church of Ibaan, dedicated to Saint James the Apostle (Santiago Apostol) as the town's patron saint, was built under Father Manuel Diez González, who was also responsible for the construction of the town's cemetery. The façade and towers were completed during the term of Father Bruno Laredo. The interior was completed under Father Vicente Maril.

The church endured two major catastrophes: a severe termite infestation, followed by the 1889 earthquake, which caused it to collapse completely at Intensity 8. Reconstruction was undertaken during the term of Father Francisco Alvarez.

==== Sastrón's account (1895) ====
The most detailed surviving Spanish-era description of Ibaan comes from Manuel Sastrón, a Spanish official who toured all 22 towns of Batangas and published his findings in Batangas y Su Provincia (1895). Sastrón described Ibaan as located about seven kilometers from the provincial capital, with a total population of 8,712 people dispersed unevenly across the town's hilly terrain and, in his assessment, showing "no signs of urbanization."

The town was connected to other towns by seven roads in fairly good condition, with five bridges, eight rivers, a dozen streams, and fifteen estuaries. The most frequently traversed route was the road leading to San Jose, which connected to the main highway. Ibaan's farmers had previously benefited from the coffee boom but by 1895 all coffee plants in Ibaan had been lost. Sugarcane had emerged as the town's main produce, traded every Saturday on market day. Sastrón also noted that the local school building was in ruins and that the crime rate was low, with animal theft being the most common offense.

==== The Revolutionary period (1896–1898) ====
As the Philippine Revolution against Spanish rule spread across the archipelago in 1896, Ibaan participated in the broader struggle. Local records indicate that one Nicolas San Agustin of the barrio of Sangang Daan attempted to rouse the barrio's inhabitants to join the revolution. The guardia civil had previously used Ibaan barrios — particularly Coliat and Calamias — as concentration points to separate civilians from nationalist fighters, a practice that fueled anti-Spanish sentiment in the community.

=== Philippine–American War and American era ===
==== Philippine–American War (1899–1901) ====
Following the Spanish–American War, American forces arrived in the Philippines, and the Philippine–American War erupted in 1899. Batangas was the last major stronghold of Filipino resistance under General Miguel Malvar. During this period, Jose Mercado Medrano Jr. and Martin Montalbo — both cabezas de barangay in Ibaan — were designated by General Malvar to collect voluntary contributions from the townspeople in support of the Philippine Revolutionary forces. One Ibaanian, Mateo Illustre, rose to lead a force against the American military.

==== Concentration camps (1902) ====
In 1902, General J. Franklin Bell ordered the establishment of military concentration zones across Batangas. Civilians were required to concentrate within a one-mile radius of the poblacion. Several families from Ibaan's outlying barrios who refused to submit took refuge in a natural fortification near the barrio of Salaban — a geological feature consisting of a deep natural cut in a precipice with a large cave at its foot. In the barrio of Lapu-lapu, those who refused to enter the concentration zones and continued to hide were sought out by American soldiers and shot. The overcrowded and insanitary conditions of the concentration camps contributed to catastrophic disease outbreaks in subsequent years.

==== Epidemics (1905–1917) ====
In 1905, a cholera epidemic broke out in Ibaan, claiming hundreds of lives, soon followed by a smallpox outbreak. In 1917, an influenza epidemic afflicted nearly every household in the municipality.

==== Infrastructure and progress (1914–1941) ====
Among the most significant infrastructure developments of the American era was the completion of the Sabang Bridge in 1914 under District Engineer John H. Caton. Before its construction, all goods moving between Ibaan and Batangas City had to be transferred onto bamboo rafts and dragged by carabaos through a shallow stream due to the impassable ravine grades. The bridge's completion transformed local transportation and commerce.

In 1918, sugar prices rose to historic highs, bringing increased prosperity to the municipality. Intermediate classes were introduced in June 1921, a new school building constructed in 1927, and the Municipal Building completed in 1928. In November 1935, Ibaan participated in the celebration of the inauguration of the Commonwealth of the Philippines. In February 1937, a Provincial Eucharistic Congress was held in Ibaan under Reverend Ernesto Fornaca.

=== World War II ===
==== Japanese occupation ====
On December 8, 1941, following Japan's attacks on American bases across the Pacific, the provincial government of Batangas transferred its seat of government to Ibaan, making it the temporary administrative capital of the province. Most neighboring towns and provincial officials evacuated to Ibaan in December 1941, causing an extraordinary surge in the town's population. The barrio of Sandalan briefly served as the seat of the Provincial Government during the early occupation period, while the barrio of Balanga hosted the evacuated Municipal Government of Ibaan.

On January 31, 1942, the Japanese Military Force occupied Ibaan. In January 1942, the Sabang Bridge was demolished by the American Army to impede the Japanese advance, cutting off motor transportation between Ibaan and Batangas City. In June 1942, schools were reopened under Japanese authority with Nihongo added to the curriculum. In May 1942, the church towers were destroyed by a powerful earthquake. On August 8, 1942, prisoners from the concentration camp at Capas, Tarlac — many of them survivors of the Bataan Death March — began returning home.

Several of Ibaan's more remote barangays served as evacuation centers for civilians fleeing Japanese-controlled areas. The barangay of Calamias, accessible only by crossing the Malaking Ilog (Great River), hosted evacuees from Poblacion Ibaan, Lipa, and Batangas City. The barangays of Coliat, Lucsuhin, Dayapan, and Munting Tubig likewise sheltered evacuees from neighboring towns across Batangas. The barangay of Sabang, cut off from Japanese reach by the blown-up bridge, served as the headquarters of the Fil-American guerrillas and the center of underground resistance operations in the area.

==== Guerrilla resistance — the Ibaan Regiment ====
The Ibaan guerrilla unit was organized on January 25, 1943, when members of the Fil-American Irregular Troops (FAIT) — a guerrilla group founded by former U.S. Army officer Colonel Hugh Straughn and organized in Batangas by Captain Jorge D. Espina — were commissioned to form units in the province. Captain Gregorio Aguado was the first guerrilla in Ibaan. On March 10, 1943, Sixto M. Guerra was chosen to command the unit, then comprising both Ibaan and Rosario, with the rank of Captain.

In November 1943, the Japanese launched a pacification campaign, and the guerrilla officers made the decision to lay down their arms to protect the civilian population. The resistance was reorganized, but in March 1944, Captain Espina was captured by the Japanese Military Police and was never heard from again. In August 1944, following the collapse of a successor guerrilla organization, the Ibaan Regiment became a founding component of the Batangas Guerrillas alongside the Rosario Regiment.

==== Japanese atrocities (1945) ====
As American forces advanced in early 1945, Japanese violence against civilians intensified across Batangas. Early on the morning of February 8, 1945, approximately 80 Japanese soldiers arrived at the barangay of Pangao before dawn. Moving from house to house, they ordered all males outside; those who refused were bayoneted or shot. Captives were bound together and shot in groups, or forced toward a well and ordered to jump in, with those who refused shot and their bodies thrown in.

Japanese soldiers burned houses and killed residents in the barangays of Bago, San Agustin, Malainin, and the former barrio of Sangang Daan. In San Agustin, men were killed and some were buried near the toilet of the barrio school. In Malainin, at least one person was killed and the Malainin Bridge was destroyed. In Lapu-lapu, inhabitants found in possession of propaganda leaflets dropped by American planes were executed and their houses burned. Residents of Bago were forced to dig defensive trenches at Soro-soro hill without pay. In December 1944, the Japanese Military Forces demolished both the Ibaan Bridge and the Matala Bridge. Historians estimate that approximately 25,000 Batangueños were massacred by Japanese soldiers during the final months of the occupation across the province, atrocities later cited in the war crimes trial of Japanese General Tomoyuki Yamashita.

==== Liberation ====
Ibaan was liberated on March 13, 1945. On March 15, 1945, an American military camp was established on the school campus. The Poblacion and its barangays became severely overcrowded as evacuees from neighboring towns and from Manila poured in, creating unsanitary conditions; the American military government later transferred some of the displaced population to Batangas City. Public schools reopened on April 5, 1945 under the Philippine Island Civil Affairs Office (PICAO), and were transferred to the Bureau of Public Schools on July 6, 1945. The Ibaan Regiment and other guerrilla fighters subsequently received official recognition as elements of the Philippine Army in service of the Armed Forces of the United States.

=== Post-war reconstruction ===
The years immediately following World War II were devoted to reconstruction. In January 1947, the church towers — destroyed by the 1942 earthquake — were inaugurated after reconstruction. In August 1949, the Ibaan Elementary School was repaired. In October 1949, the Ibaan Bridge was reopened to the public at a cost of ₱19,000, and in May 1949 the Matala Bridge was reopened at a cost of ₱14,000. In 1950, the Dayapan Bridge was completed at a cost of ₱50,000. In 1951, the Sabang Bridge was reconstructed by the United States Rehabilitation Administration at a cost of ₱49,990.

In 1951, responding to a directive from President Elpidio Quirino to reconstruct local histories, the Ibaan District of the Department of Education submitted comprehensive Historical Data documents for the municipality and all of its individual barangays, now preserved at the National Library of the Philippines Digital Collections.

In 1956, the barrio of Bungahan was formally constituted as a distinct barrio of Ibaan.

== Geography ==
Ibaan is located at 13°49′03″N 121°07′59″E. It is 13 kilometres (8.1 mi) from Batangas City and 118 kilometres (73 mi) from Manila. It is bounded to the northwest by San Jose, to the northeast by Lipa, to the east by Rosario, to the southeast by Taysan, and to the southwest by Batangas City. It has a land area of 68.99 square kilometers (26.64 sq mi) at an altitude of 124 meters (407 ft) above sea level.

According to the Philippine Statistics Authority, the municipality has a land area of 68.99 square kilometers (26.64 sq mi) constituting 2.21% of the 3,119.75-square-kilometer (1,204.54 sq mi) total area of Batangas.

=== Barangays ===
Ibaan is politically subdivided into 26 barangays, as shown in the matrix below. Each barangay consists of puroks and some have sitios.

Bungahan was constituted as a barrio in 1956.

PSGC	Barangay	Population			±% p.a.	
		2024		2010		
041010001	Bago	3.5%	2,047	1,985	▴	0.21%
041010002	Balanga	3.2%	1,883	1,781	▴	0.38%
041010003	Bungahan	2.3%	1,355	1,276	▴	0.41%
041010004	Calamias	3.6%	2,125	1,848	▴	0.96%
041010005	Catandala	1.9%	1,143	949	▴	1.29%
041010006	Coliat	6.9%	4,026	3,213	▴	1.56%
041010007	Dayapan	1.4%	841	733	▴	0.95%
041010008	Lapu‑lapu	3.3%	1,914	1,712	▴	0.77%
041010009	Lucsuhin	2.6%	1,508	1,510	▾	−0.01%
041010010	Mabalor	1.4%	820	821	▾	−0.01%
041010011	Malainin	1.8%	1,070	1,082	▾	−0.08%
041010012	Matala	5.4%	3,178	3,083	▴	0.21%
041010013	Munting‑Tubig	3.2%	1,866	1,700	▴	0.64%
041010014	Palindan	3.9%	2,275	2,165	▴	0.34%
041010015	Pangao	5.5%	3,216	2,827	▴	0.89%
041010016	Panghayaan	1.4%	836	888	▾	−0.41%
041010017	Poblacion	4.6%	2,711	2,518	▴	0.51%
041010018	Quilo	2.9%	1,699	1,556	▴	0.61%
041010019	Sabang	3.1%	1,820	1,802	▴	0.07%
041010020	Salaban I	2.3%	1,374	1,125	▴	1.38%
041010022	San Agustin	3.9%	2,259	2,070	▴	0.60%
041010023	Sandalan	2.2%	1,283	1,243	▴	0.22%
041010024	Santo Niño	5.3%	3,107	2,954	▴	0.35%
041010025	Talaibon	6.7%	3,902	3,376	▴	1.00%
041010027	Tulay na Patpat	5.9%	3,441	3,047	▴	0.84%
041010028	Salaban II	2.2%	1,271	1,218	▴	0.29%
	Total		58,673	48,482	▴	1.32%

=== Climate ===
Temperature is moderate both in its rainy and dry seasons, conducive to farming, agricultural and livestock production, which are the most common occupations. There are fewer farmers each year as residents switch to hog-raising, which provides better income.

Climate data for Ibaan, Batangas
Month	Jan	Feb	Mar	Apr	May	Jun	Jul	Aug	Sep	Oct	Nov	Dec	Year
Mean daily maximum °C (°F)	28 (82)	29 (84)	31 (88)	32 (90)	31 (88)	30 (86)	28 (82)	28 (82)	28 (82)	28 (82)	29 (84)	28 (82)	29 (84)
Mean daily minimum °C (°F)	19 (66)	19 (66)	20 (68)	21 (70)	23 (73)	24 (75)	23 (73)	24 (75)	23 (73)	22 (72)	21 (70)	20 (68)	22 (71)
Average precipitation mm (inches)	11 (0.4)	13 (0.5)	14 (0.6)	32 (1.3)	101 (4.0)	142 (5.6)	208 (8.2)	187 (7.4)	175 (6.9)	131 (5.2)	68 (2.7)	39 (1.5)	1,121 (44.3)
Average rainy days	5.2	5.0	7.4	11.5	19.8	23.5	27.0	25.9	25.2	23.2	15.5	8.3	197.5
Source: Meteoblue (modeled/calculated data, not measured locally)

== Demographics ==
Population census of Ibaan
Year	Pop.	±% p.a.
1903	7,178	—
1918	8,320	+0.99%
1939	9,788	+0.78%
1948	10,909	+1.21%
1960	15,709	+3.08%
1970	21,067	+2.97%
1975	23,019	+1.79%
1980	25,875	+2.37%
1990	31,220	+1.90%
1995	34,757	+2.03%
2000	40,165	+3.15%
2007	45,649	+1.78%
2010	48,482	+2.22%
2015	52,970	+1.70%
2020	58,507	+2.11%
2024	58,673	+0.07%
Source: Philippine Statistics Authority

In the 2024 census, Ibaan had a population of 58,673 people. The population density was 850 inhabitants per square kilometer (2,200/sq mi).

=== Language ===
Tagalog is the local language in the Batangueño dialect; however, English is included in its educational curriculum and is often used in official dealings and transactions.

=== Religion ===
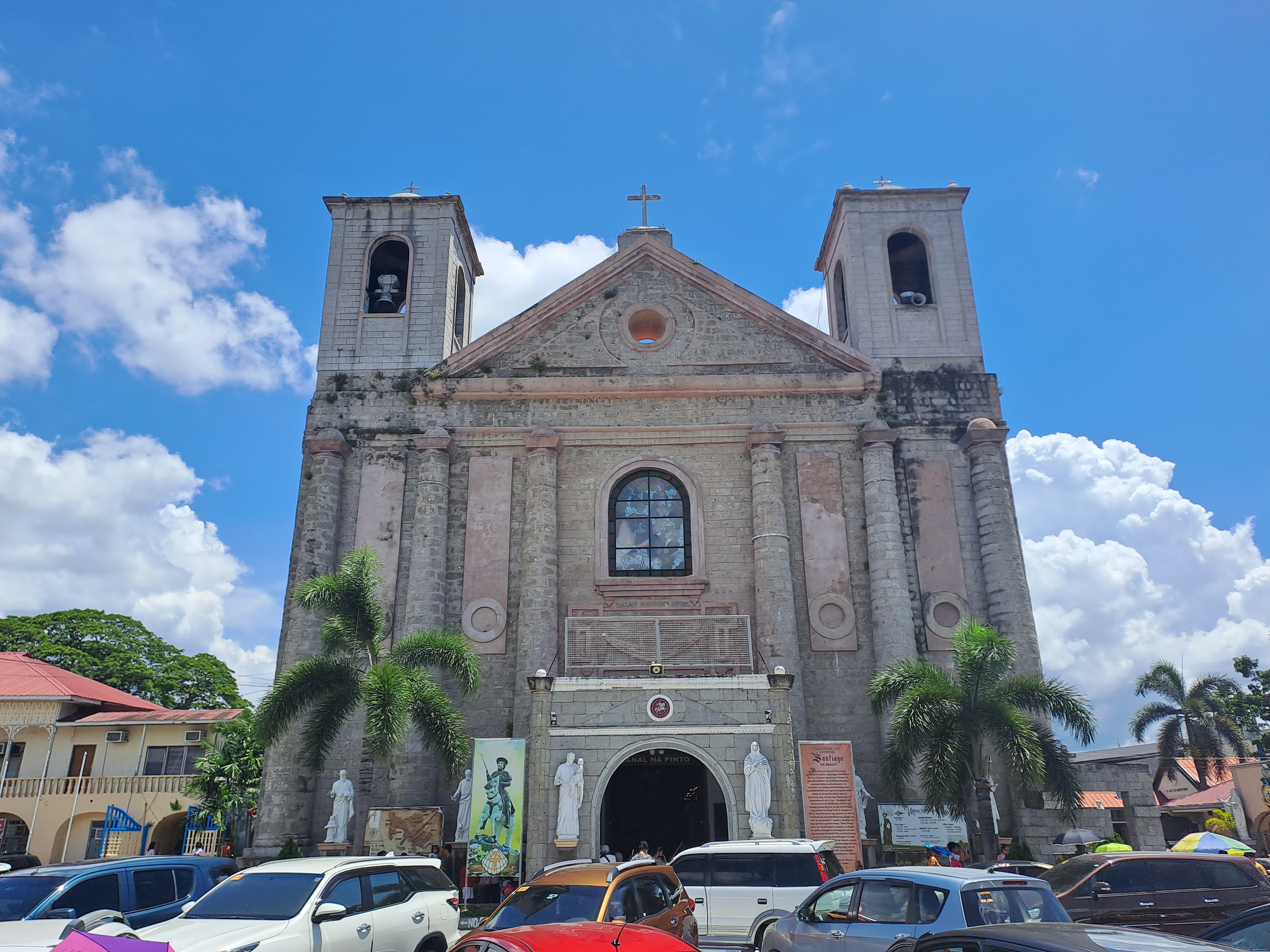
Archdiocesan Shrine and Parish of Saint James the Greater

Ibaan is home to the Archdiocesan Shrine and Parish of Saint James the Greater, the seat of the Roman Catholicism in Ibaan and the oldest church in town.

It is a predominantly Roman Catholic community, with small percentages of Protestants and members of the Iglesia ni Cristo. The indigenous Iglesia ni Cristo has several locales in the town, including the chapels in Coliat and Matala. Other than this, non-denominational full gospel churches are also established to name a few like Jesus the Anointed One Church, United Pentecostal Church and Jesus is Lord Church.

== Economy ==
Poverty incidence of Ibaan (%)

Source: Philippine Statistics Authority

Ibaan main products include tamales, kulambo (mosquito net), lomi, panutsa (sweet peanut), and sugarcane.

== Transportation ==
The town is served by the Southern Tagalog Arterial Road (STAR), a toll road that connects the capital, Manila, with Batangas City.

== Culture ==
=== Festivals ===
The Les KuhLiemBo Festival is the annual festival of Ibaan, Batangas, celebrated every February 11. Its name comes from five products that represent the town's culture and livelihood: Tamales, Kulambo, Habi, Liempo, and Tubo. The festival features street dancing, cultural presentations, local products, and various community activities. It aims to promote Ibaan's rich heritage, recognize the hard work of its people, support local businesses, and strengthen the pride and unity of the Ibaeños. It also celebrates civic and national holidays. December 30 is celebrated in Ibaan, Batangas as its Annual Thanksgiving Day. It is a special occasion for the people of Ibaan to express gratitude for the blessings received throughout the year.

. Each barangay also has its own festivity guided by their patron saint. The town is host to the Feast of Saint James, held every 25 July, which draws hundreds of Catholic devotees. Another religious feast held in Ibaan is the Procession Feast of Holy Week. Non-religious holidays include New Year's Day, National Heroes' Day, Bonifacio Day, and Rizal Day.

Flower festivals are customarily held every May across the barangays of Ibaan, a tradition observed since at least the early 20th century.

=== Traditional customs and social life ===
==== Birth and baptism ====
When a child is born, neighbors and relatives — especially young people — keep vigil over the newly born infant until after the child is baptized by a priest, out of fear of evil spirits such as the aswang, patianak, iki, wakwak, tigbalang, and mankukulam who were believed capable of bewitching or stealing the infant. The baptism is typically accompanied by merrymaking and feasting, often at considerable expense to the parents. It was common for families to incur debt in order to feed the entire community at a baptismal celebration.

Various practices surrounded childbirth. In the barrio of Coliat, it was believed that if a family desired a boy after a succession of daughters, the expectant mother had to steal a man's personal article to ensure the birth of a son. A pregnant woman was advised not to sit on the steps of a staircase, lest she face a difficult delivery. It was also considered unwise to have the back porch (batalan) of the house built or repaired during pregnancy. In the barrio of Malainin, coins, a pencil, and a printed manuscript were placed near the baby during its first bath, symbolizing a wish for the child to grow up prosperous and educated. In Catandala, the birth of a boy was regarded with considerably more pride by the father than the birth of a girl.

To ensure a newborn would acquire a special talent, something was buried with the placenta: a needle and thread, for example, so that the child might become a skilled dressmaker.

==== Courtship ====
Traditional courtship in Ibaan's barangays was highly formal and governed by strict social rules. A suitor was not permitted to approach a young woman on his own; courtship was arranged through the parents. In many barangays, a man's kin would formally ascend the stairs of the woman's family home at night to make arrangements and plead the suitor's case on his behalf. In the barrio of Talaibon, this was described as a "miniature delegation" — the suitor's father, mother, and the most influential person in the locality — who would speak words of tender persuasion deep into the still night on the young man's behalf.

When a suitor visited the home of a young woman, he was required to enter with great courtesy. In Coliat and in the Poblacion, it was customary for the man to walk in a kneeling position from the door up to the one he wished to pay respects to. In the barangay of Pangao, the suitor was not permitted to sit on a bench; he was to sit on the floor. Conversation between the young man and the young woman was extremely limited, with the old folks watching every move closely. When the parents began closing the windows late at night, it was the signal that the visit was over.

Before marriage, the suitor was required to render personal service to the girl's family — fetching water, feeding animals, pounding rice — for a period of several months or even a year. The length of this servitude, along with the bigaykaya (bride price), was typically fixed in the marriage contract. Any violation of the contract was penalized with a heavy fine. Elopement was considered a serious transgression against both families.

==== Marriage ====
Weddings in Ibaan were typically arranged during the months of December, January, and May. The celebration was accompanied by feasting and merrymaking at the home of the bride. After the ceremony, the bride and groom's relatives would transfer together to the groom's home. Among the older pre-Christian customs preserved in the barrio records of Bago, the wedding ceremony itself was simple: the groom and bride drank wine from the same cup, and as they drank, the guests gave a shout — and they were considered married. Lavish feasting was common, with several cows and pigs slaughtered for the occasion in better-off households.

==== Death and mourning ====
When a person in the family died, it was the custom for women to wear black and for men to wear a black ribbon or band around the arm, a period of mourning maintained for a full year. Special evening prayers were said for nine successive nights. Formal prayer gatherings were held on the fourth and ninth days after death, and again on the thirtieth day (for women) or fortieth day (for men), and finally at the end of the year — each occasion accompanied by a feast for family, relatives, and neighbors.

The belief system surrounding death in Ibaan's barangays reflected both pre-Christian and Catholic influences. In Calamias, the ancient people believed that a person was composed of an ethereal body and an eternal soul, and that the soul lived on after death. Because of this belief in a future life, the early inhabitants took care in burying their dead, embalming the corpse using herbs and perfumes, and placing it in a hardwood coffin along with clothes, weapons, food, tools, drink, and gold. Professional mourners were hired to chant the noble deeds of the deceased. The burial places were near or under the house, in caves, or on headlands overlooking the sea.

=== Beliefs and superstitions ===
The barangays of Ibaan preserved a rich body of folk beliefs about natural phenomena, the spirit world, and everyday omens, documented across multiple barrios in the 1951–1953 Historical Data records.

Eclipses were believed to have a direct effect on romantic relationships: a suitor whose proposal was made during an eclipse would meet with rejection — described as Pinaglahuang Pag-ibig (eclipsed love). For those newly engaged, an eclipse signified a temporary break caused by a third party. For couples long engaged, however, an eclipse was an omen of everlasting happiness. Earthquakes were interpreted as the wrath of God, though some believed they were caused by the meeting of heat and cold beneath the earth.

The spirit world was populated with feared beings. The aswang assumed the form of a dog, cat, or other animal and was believed to eat human flesh. The mangkukulam caused illness or death by pricking a doll with a magic pin. The tikbalang took the form of a dog, horse, or old man to deceive victims. People placed faith in the protective power of anting-anting (amulets or charms) to guard against these supernatural threats.

Natural sounds were laden with meaning. The squeaking of a rat, the howling of a dog, the singing of a lizard (butiki), and the crash of an old tree in the silence of the night were all considered bad omens presaging death or misfortune. The long wailing hoot of an owl at night was an omen of death or pestilence. A lizard crossing one's path was an evil omen, and proceeding regardless was said to invite an accident. Sneezing at the start of a journey was considered an ill omen. At harvest time, when the bahaw bird sang, a rich harvest was believed to be coming.

Everyday behaviors carried prophetic weight. If a young girl sang in front of a stove or fire, she was said to be destined to marry an old widower. The cackling of hens at twilight or at midnight was interpreted as a sign that an unmarried woman had been unchaste. The bohusan — an informal wetting ceremony for a newborn — was still practiced in many barangays before the formal Catholic baptism, a custom blending older tradition with newer religious practice.

Pre-Christian belief in the supreme creator god Bathala was also recorded in the historical data of the barrio of Bago, reflecting the enduring memory of the archipelago's pre-colonial spiritual life.

=== Sports ===
Most barangays have a makeshift basketball court, with court markings drawn on the roads. Larger barangays have covered courts where interbarangay leagues are held every summer (April to May).

The town has several well-known sports venues, such as the Bro. Medrano Plaza and Recto Gymnasium, the home of the now defunct Ibaan Basketball Team. The Bro. Medrano Plaza, which houses the basketball and volleyball courts, had hosted several multi-sport events and games.

Other well-known sports facilities include the Recto Gym, operated by the local government, and the Fr. Guido Colletti Gym, a private venue owned by Saint James Academy.

== Education ==
Ibaan Saint James Academy, Inc., the oldest private school in the municipality

The Ibaan Schools District Office governs all educational institutions within the municipality. It oversees the management and operations of all private and public, from primary to secondary schools.

=== Primary and elementary schools ===
- Acts Christian Academy
- Balanga Elementary School
- Bright Christian Academy
- Bungahan Elementary School
- Coliat Elementary School
- Gregorio Sison Memorial Elementary School
- Ibaan Central School
- Ibaan Nazareth School
- Ibaan Saint James Academy
- Lucsuhin Elementary School
- Mabalor-Catandala Elementary School
- Malainin Elementary School
- Maranatha Christian Academy
- Marfeben Academy
- Munting Tubig Elementary School
- Our Lady of Grace Formation School
- Palindan Elementary School
- Panghayaan Elementary School
- Quilo Elementary School
- Sabang Elementary School
- San Agustin Elementary School
- St. Jude Science and Technological School
- Sto. Nino Elementary School
- Talaibon Elementary School
- Tulay Elementary School
- Tulay-Calamias Elementary School

=== Secondary schools ===
- Dr. Juan A. Pastor Integrated National High School
- Lucsuhin Integrated School
- Mabalor-Catandala Integrated School
- Maximo T. Hernandez Memorial Integrated High School
- Procopio Mailig Memorial Integrated School
- San Agustin Integrated School

== Gallery ==
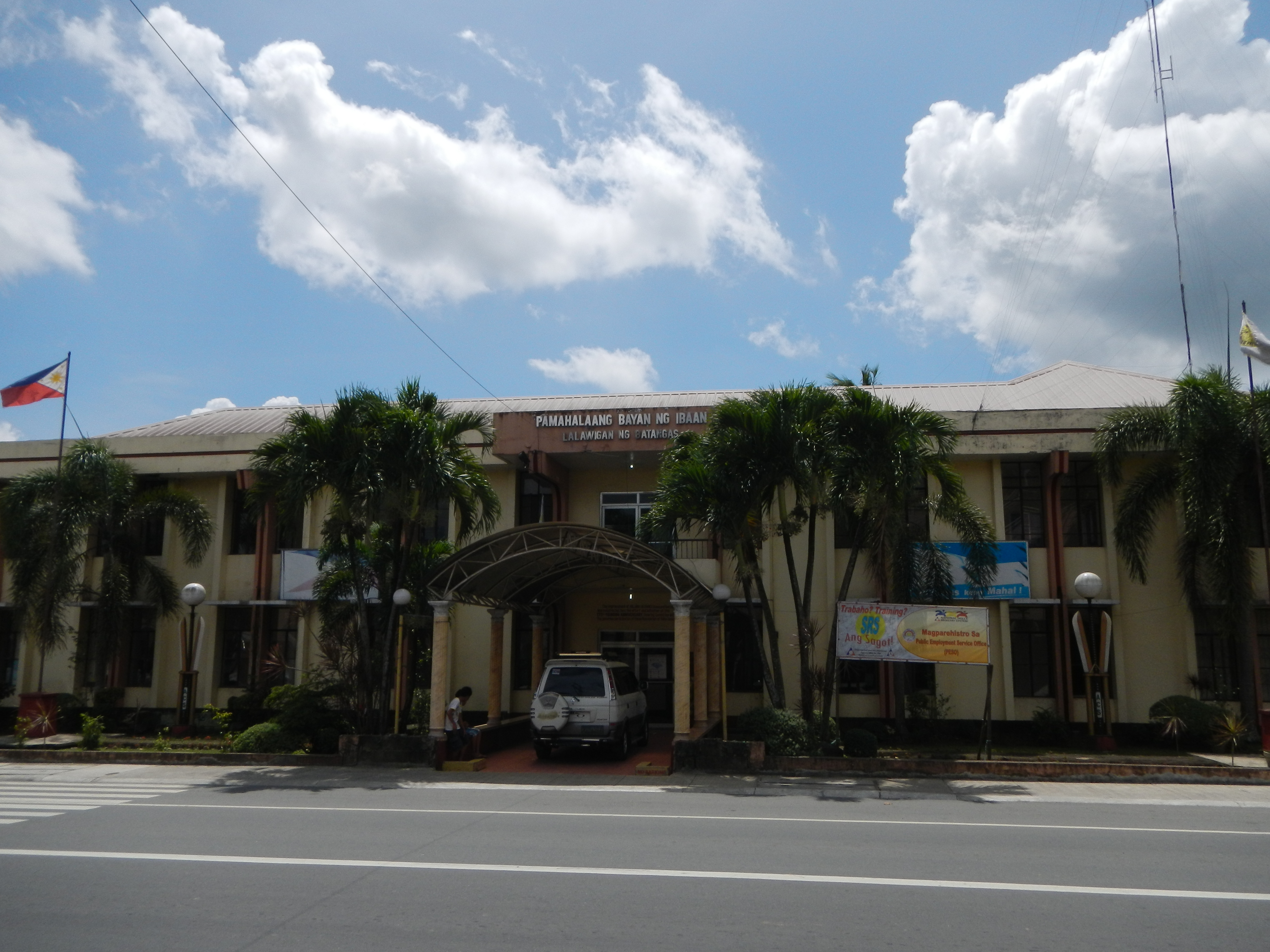
Municipal hall

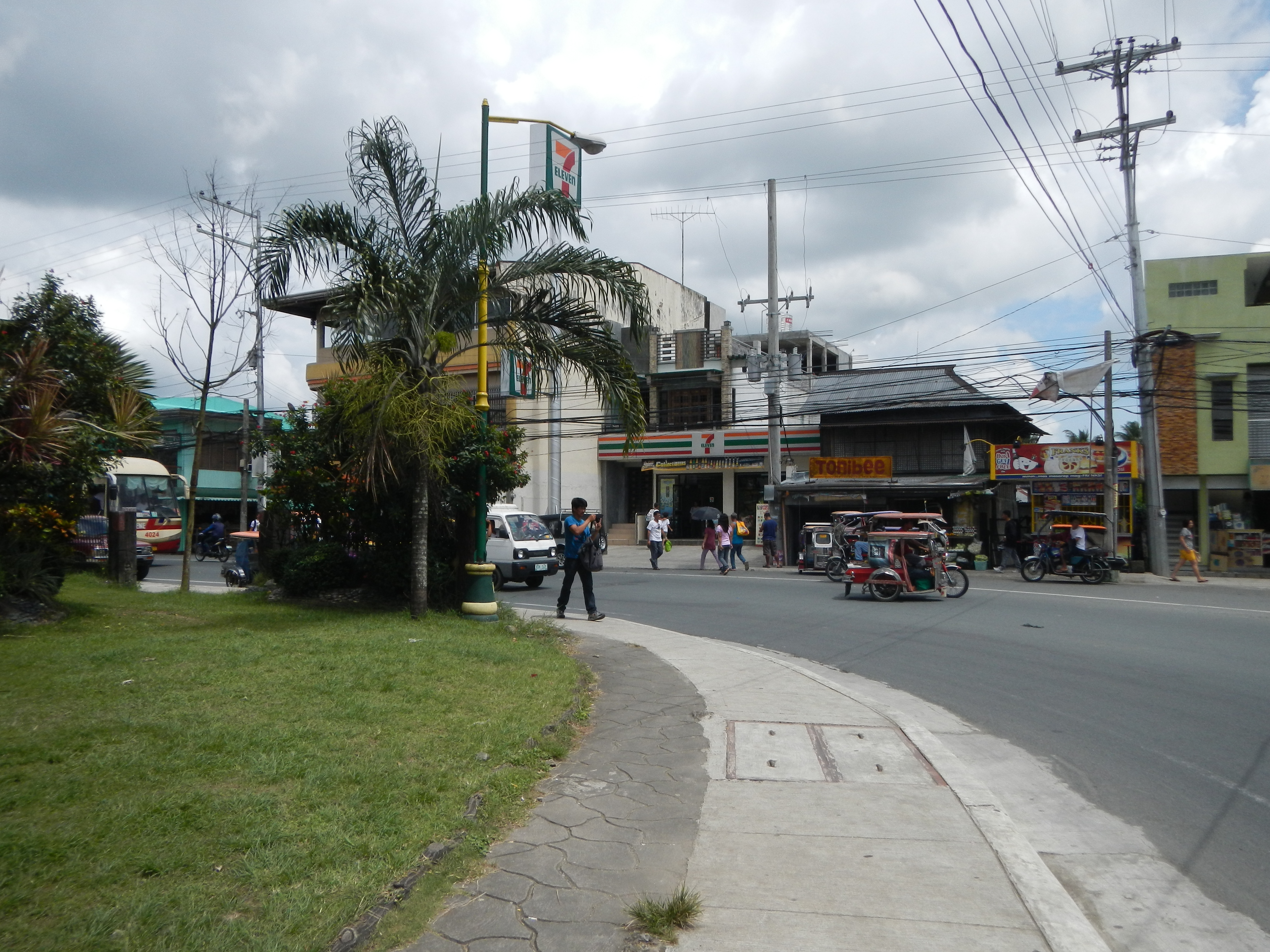
Downtown Ibaan

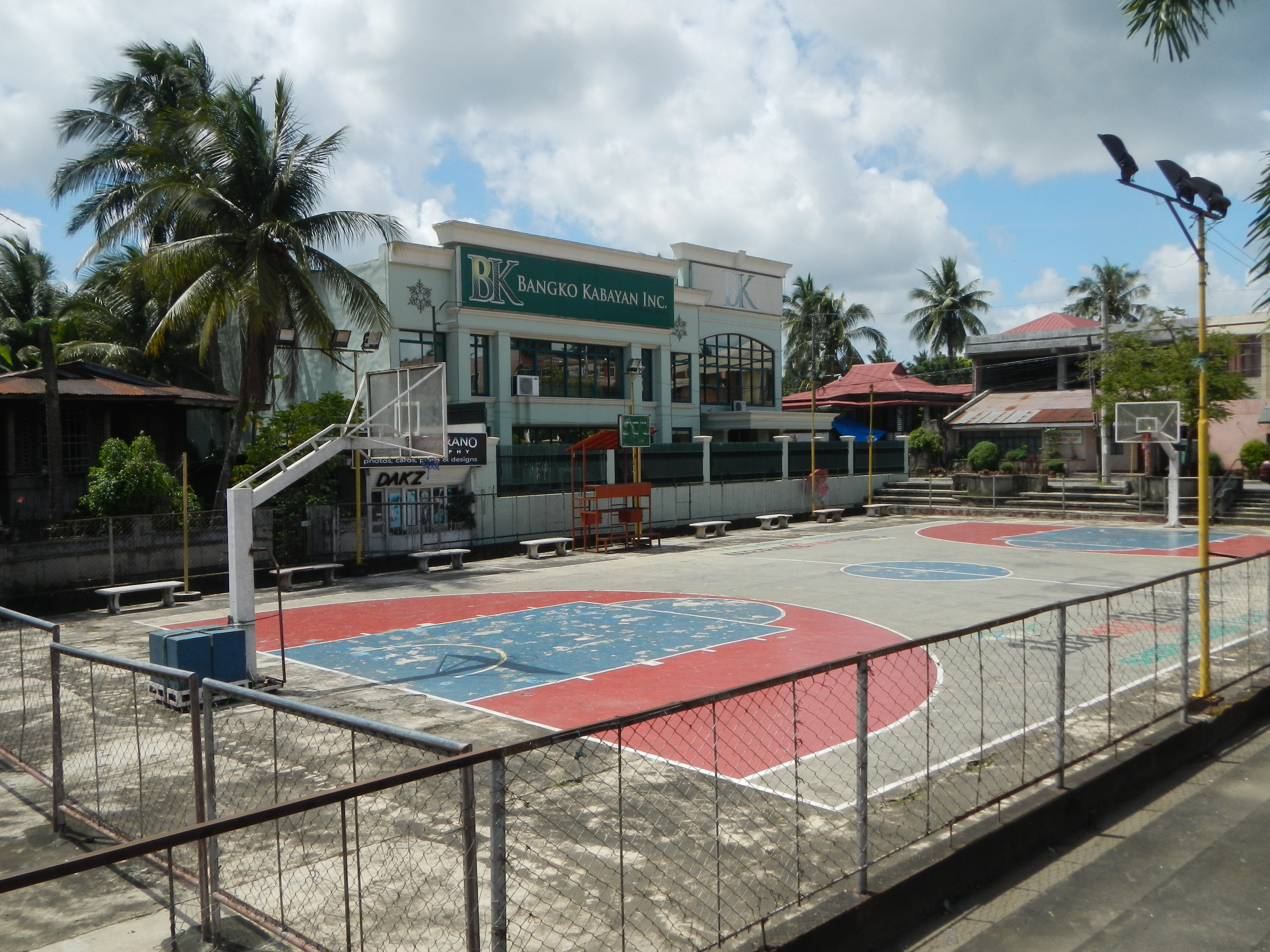
B.R. Medrano Memorial Plaza (Demolished)

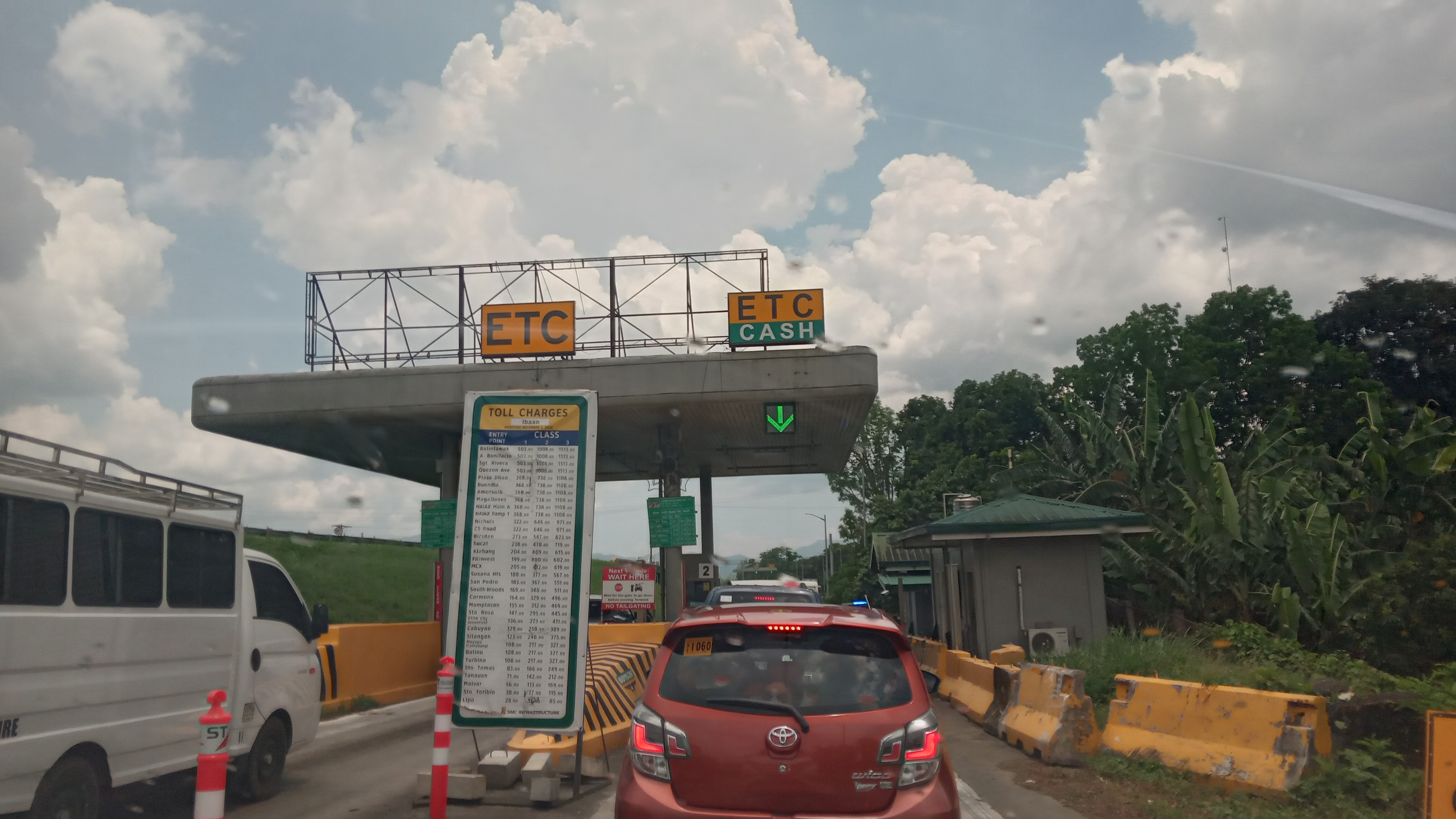
Ibaan Exit of STAR Tollway
