= San Jose, Batangas =

Municipality in Batangas, Philippines

San Jose Malaking Tubig San José del Río Grande
- Municipality
- Municipality of San Jose
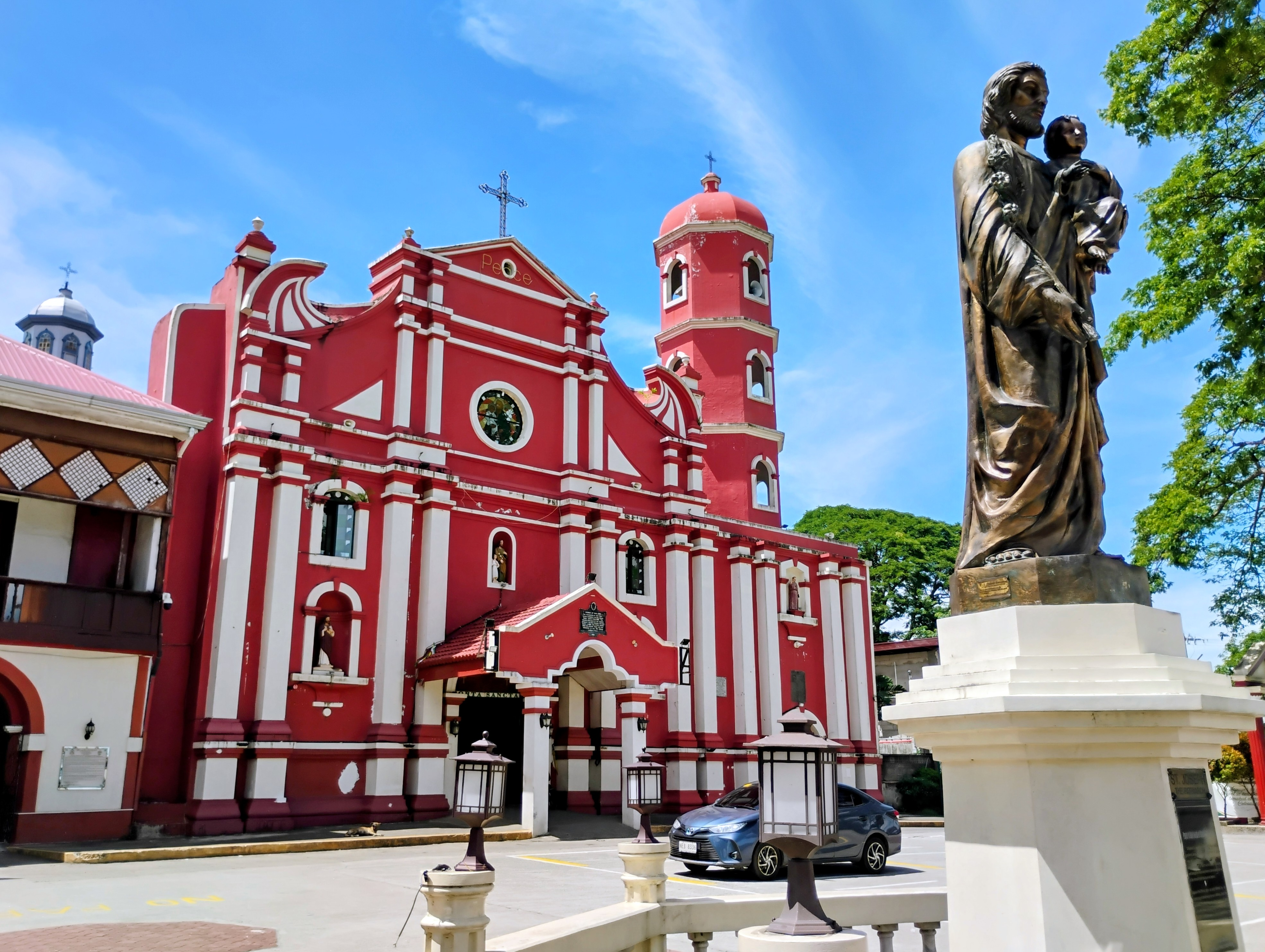
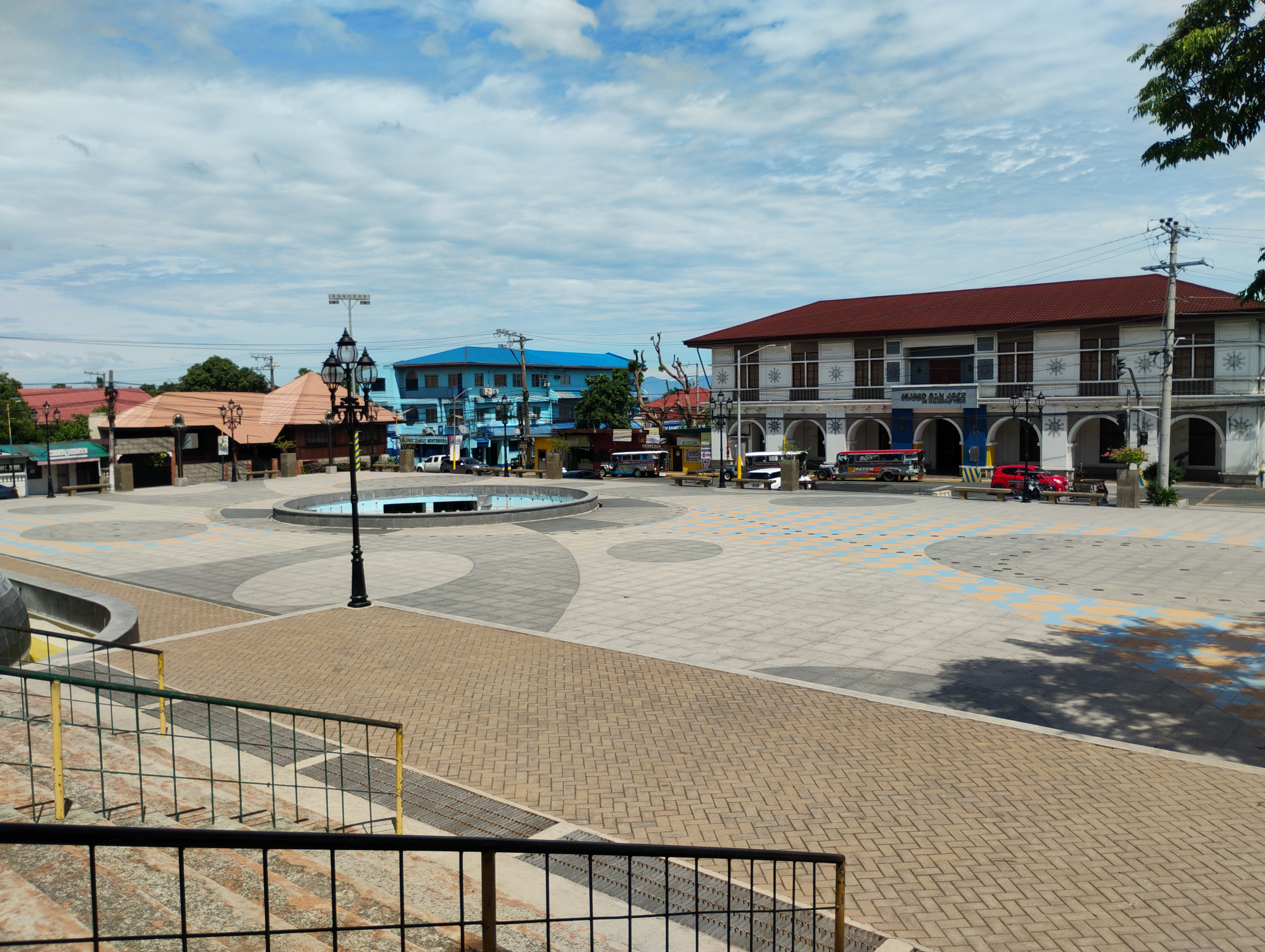
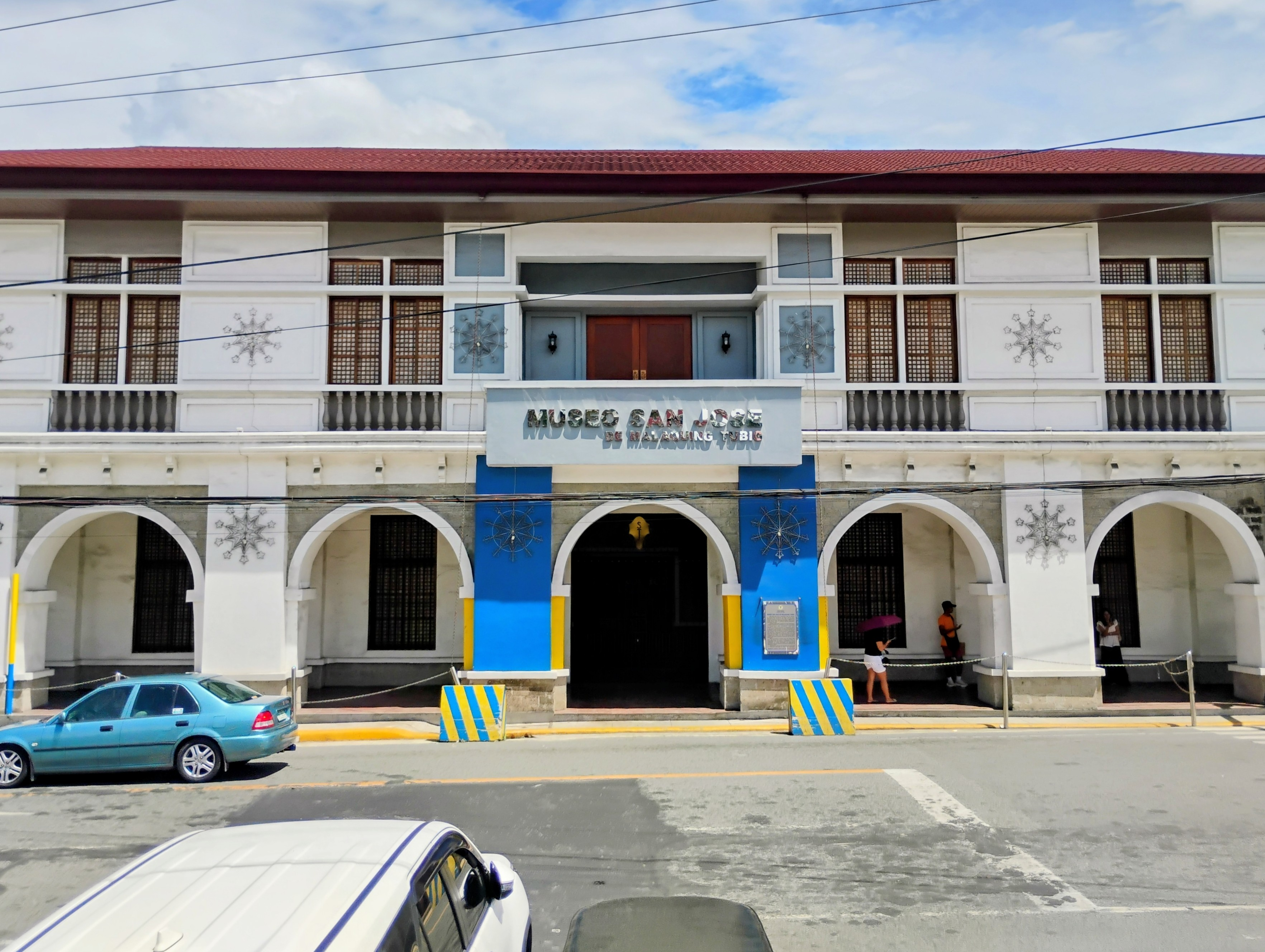
- Saint Joseph the Patriarch Church San Jose Municipal Plaza Museo San Jose de Malaquing Tubig

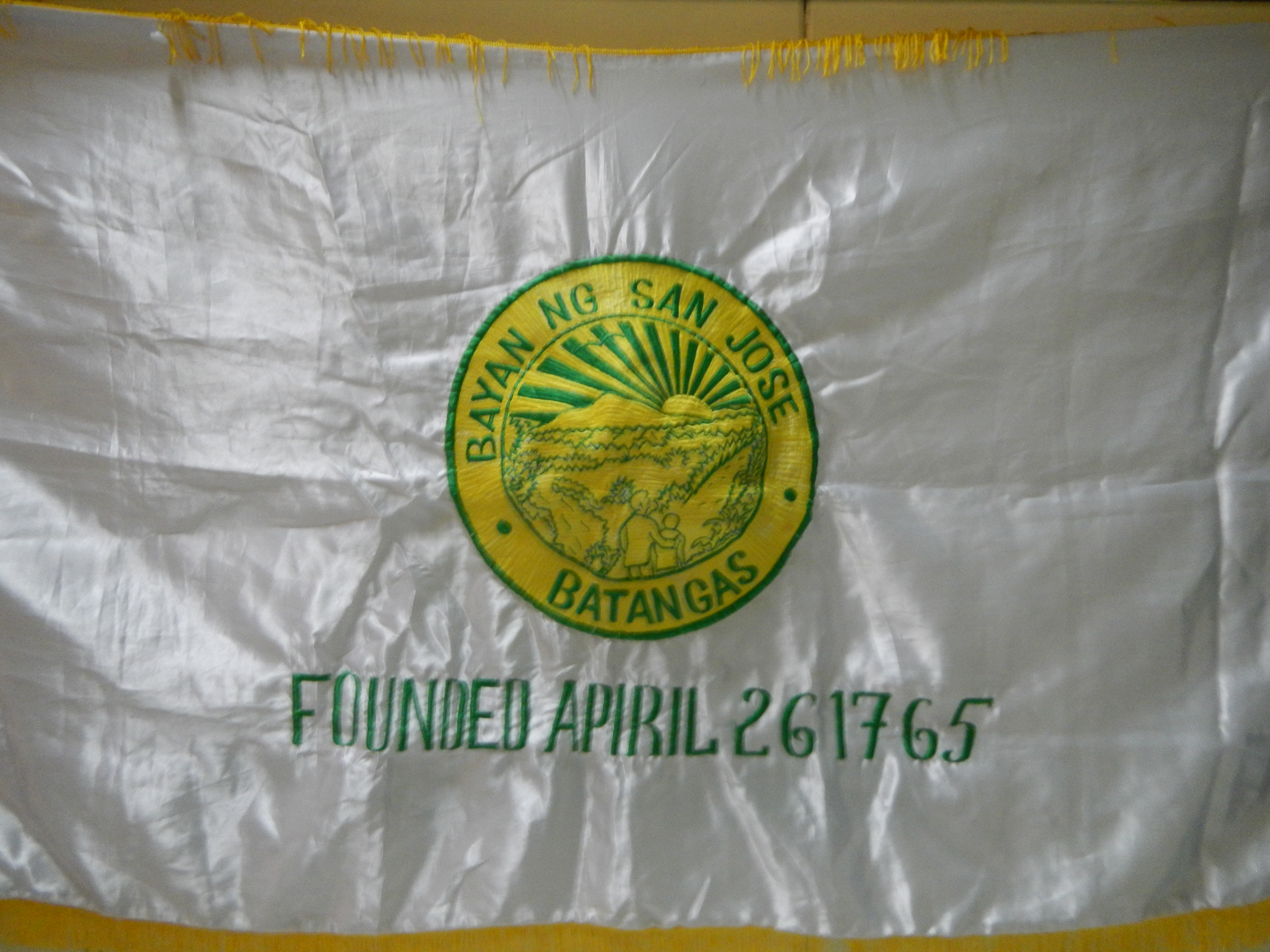
- Flag
- Nickname: Egg Basket of the Philippines
- Map of Batangas with San Jose highlighted
- Interactive map of San Jose
- Location within the Philippines
- Coordinates: 13°52′38″N 121°06′18″E
- Country: Philippines
- Region: Calabarzon
- Province: Batangas
- District: 4th district
- Founded: December 11, 1766
- Named for: Saint Joseph
- Barangays: 33 (see Barangays)

Government
  - Type: Sangguniang Bayan
  - Mayor: Reggie A. Virtucio
  - Vice Mayor: Valentino R. Patron
  - Representative: Amado Carlos A. Bolilia IV
  - Municipal Council: Members: Arnold M. Comia; Kathleen B. Queyquep; Jose Nereus M. Agbing; Benito P. Atienza; Ralph Anthony B. Makalintal; Joey G. Mendoza; Japoy G. Zara; Rheiven A. Arcilla
  - Electorate: 62,236 voters (2025)

Area
  - Total: 53.29 km^{2} (20.58 sq mi)
- Elevation: 191 m (627 ft)
- Highest elevation: 947 m (3,107 ft)
- Lowest elevation: 5 m (16 ft)

Population (2024 census)
  - Total: 81,170
  - Density: 1,523/km^{2} (3,945/sq mi)
  - Households: 20,518

Economy
  - Income class: 1st municipal income class
  - Poverty incidence: 6.54% (2023)
  - Revenue: ₱ 409.6 million (2024)
  - Assets: ₱ 1,913 million (2024)
  - Expenditure: ₱ 175.4 million (2024)
  - Liabilities: ₱ 129.6 million (2024)

Service provider
  - Electricity: Batangas 2 Electric Cooperative (BATELEC 2)
- Time zone: UTC+8 (PST)
- ZIP code: 4227
- PSGC: 0401022000
- IDD : area code: +63 (0)43
- Native languages: Tagalog
- Catholic diocese: Archdiocese of Lipa
- Patron saint: Saint Joseph

San Jose, officially the Municipality of San Jose (Tagalog: Bayan ng San Jose), is a municipality in the province of Batangas, Philippines. According to the 2024 census, it has a population of 81,170 people.

== Etymology ==
The name of San Jose originates from its previous name as a barrio: San José de Malaquing Tubig or San José de Malaking Tubig. The first part of the name comes from Spanish for its patron saint, Saint Joseph, and Fr. Jose Victoria, the parish priest of Bauan Church, under which the town once fell. The second part, Malaquing Tubig or Malaking Tubig, translates to "big river" or literally "big water" in Tagalog, referring to body of water that cuts through the area.

== History ==
The Aetas were the first inhabitants of the place. They started clearing some portions of the wilderness especially in areas near the riverbanks. Several groups of settlers then drove this Aetas to the hinterlands and permanently occupied the place. They named it “Malaquing Tubig” which literally translates to "big river" referring to body of water that cuts through the central portion of their early settlement.

The Spaniards then colonized the Philippines in 1565. Bauan was established in 1596 as an ecclesiastical unit administered by the Order of Saint Augustine with Malaquing Tubig as one of the barrios under its jurisdiction.

Human population of Malaquing Tubig started to grow and in 1754, Taal Volcano erupted, destroying the original Bauan. And before its actual site could have been selected, Malaking Tubig was separated from Bauan. The recognized leaders of Malaquing Tubig then petitioned to the Spanish authorities for the creation of that place as a pueblo which was granted to them on April 26, 1765.

On April 26, 1765, the barrio or sitio was renamed as San José de Malaquing Tubig by Fr. Jose Victoria, the parish priest of Bauan Church who presided a Mass there. This date is also noted as the day the residents petitioned to separate from Bauan and become an independent parish and town.

On December 11, 1766, the barrio was separated from Bauan and became a town named San Jose. Ignacio de los Santos was named as its first governadorcillo circa 1767. In the new town's establishment, it originally included the land that now makes up Cuenca, which was separated to become an independent municipality in 1876 or 1877.

== Geography ==
San Jose is located at 13°52′38″N 121°06′18″E. According to the Philippine Statistics Authority, the municipality has a land area of 53.29 square kilometers (20.58 sq mi) constituting 1.71% of the 3,119.75-square-kilometer- (1,204.54 sq mi) total area of Batangas.

San Jose is 15 kilometers (9.3 mi) from Batangas City and 90 kilometers (56 mi) from Manila. The municipality is bounded in the north and north-east by Lipa, east by Ibaan, south by Batangas City and San Pascual, and west by Cuenca and Alitagtag.

=== Barangays ===
San Jose is politically subdivided into 33 barangays, as shown in the matrix below. Each barangay consists of puroks and some have sitios.

PSGC	Barangay	Population			±% p.a.	
		2024		2010		
041022001	Aguila	3.3%	2,664	2,364	▴	0.83%
041022002	Anus	1.4%	1,150	959	▴	1.27%
041022003	Aya	4.4%	3,548	3,181	▴	0.76%
041022004	Bagong Pook	1.3%	1,079	926	▴	1.07%
041022005	Balagtasin	4.4%	3,553	3,257	▴	0.60%
041022006	Balagtasin I	1.7%	1,399	1,297	▴	0.53%
041022007	Banaybanay I	7.9%	6,418	5,742	▴	0.77%
041022008	Banaybanay II	5.1%	4,135	3,679	▴	0.81%
041022009	Bigain I	2.9%	2,327	2,129	▴	0.62%
041022010	Bigain II	1.5%	1,180	1,094	▴	0.53%
041022011	Calansayan	5.2%	4,214	3,795	▴	0.73%
041022012	Dagatan	3.5%	2,822	2,385	▴	1.17%
041022013	Don Luis	2.4%	1,951	1,748	▴	0.76%
041022014	Galamay‑Amo	7.0%	5,702	4,986	▴	0.93%
041022015	Lalayat	3.0%	2,462	2,226	▴	0.70%
041022016	Lapolapo I	2.3%	1,892	1,689	▴	0.79%
041022017	Lapolapo II	2.9%	2,345	2,130	▴	0.67%
041022018	Lepute	1.0%	807	755	▴	0.46%
041022019	Lumil	3.8%	3,119	2,800	▴	0.75%
041022020	Natunuan	2.2%	1,787	1,620	▴	0.68%
041022021	Palanca	2.3%	1,878	1,741	▴	0.53%
041022022	Pinagtung‑Ulan	5.4%	4,398	3,989	▴	0.68%
041022023	Poblacion Barangay I	0.3%	228	278	▾	−1.36%
041022024	Poblacion Barangay II	0.6%	491	502	▾	−0.15%
041022025	Poblacion Barangay III	0.3%	279	318	▾	−0.90%
041022026	Poblacion Barangay IV	0.4%	339	385	▾	−0.88%
041022027	Sabang	2.0%	1,592	1,237	▴	1.76%
041022028	Salaban	2.0%	1,583	1,322	▴	1.26%
041022029	Santo Cristo	3.4%	2,762	2,477	▴	0.76%
041022030	Mojon‑Tampoy	2.9%	2,355	1,860	▴	1.65%
041022031	Taysan	4.5%	3,654	3,090	▴	1.17%
041022032	Tugtug	2.2%	1,765	1,554	▴	0.89%
041022033	Bigain South	1.3%	1,093	1,002	▴	0.60%
	Total		81,170	68,517	▴	1.18%

=== Climate ===
Climate data for San Jose, Batangas
Month	Jan	Feb	Mar	Apr	May	Jun	Jul	Aug	Sep	Oct	Nov	Dec	Year
Mean daily maximum °C (°F)	27 (81)	28 (82)	30 (86)	31 (88)	30 (86)	29 (84)	28 (82)	27 (81)	27 (81)	28 (82)	28 (82)	27 (81)	28 (83)
Mean daily minimum °C (°F)	18 (64)	18 (64)	19 (66)	21 (70)	23 (73)	23 (73)	23 (73)	23 (73)	23 (73)	21 (70)	20 (68)	19 (66)	21 (69)
Average precipitation mm (inches)	11 (0.4)	13 (0.5)	14 (0.6)	32 (1.3)	101 (4.0)	142 (5.6)	208 (8.2)	187 (7.4)	175 (6.9)	131 (5.2)	68 (2.7)	39 (1.5)	1,121 (44.3)
Average rainy days	5.2	5.0	7.4	11.5	19.8	23.5	27.0	25.9	25.2	23.2	15.5	8.3	197.5
Source: Meteoblue

== Demographics ==
Population census of San Jose
Year	Pop.	±% p.a.
1903	8,996	—
1918	11,074	+1.40%
1939	12,197	+0.46%
1948	14,645	+2.05%
1960	18,675	+2.05%
1970	24,450	+2.73%
1975	25,757	+1.05%
1980	28,743	+2.22%
1990	38,680	+3.01%
1995	43,886	+2.39%
2000	51,965	+3.69%
2007	61,307	+2.31%
2010	68,517	+4.13%
2015	76,971	+2.24%
2020	79,868	+0.78%
2024	81,170	+0.39%
Source: Philippine Statistics Authority

In the 2024 census, San Jose had a population of 81,170 people. The population density was 1,500 inhabitants per square kilometer (3,900/sq mi).

== Economy ==
Poverty incidence of San Jose (%)

Source: Philippine Statistics Authority

San Jose is well known for growing good varieties of coffee, lanzones, and black pepper. It is where a great number of poultry and piggery animals are grown and sold, especially to Metro Manila, where it supplies a significant percentage of poultry products. Most of the San Jose workforce is either directly or indirectly involved in farming. There are also numerous feedmill corporations within its jurisdiction which include WhiteGold, Everlast, Busilac, Wincom, New Golden Mix.

== Government ==
=== List of former Municipal Executives ===
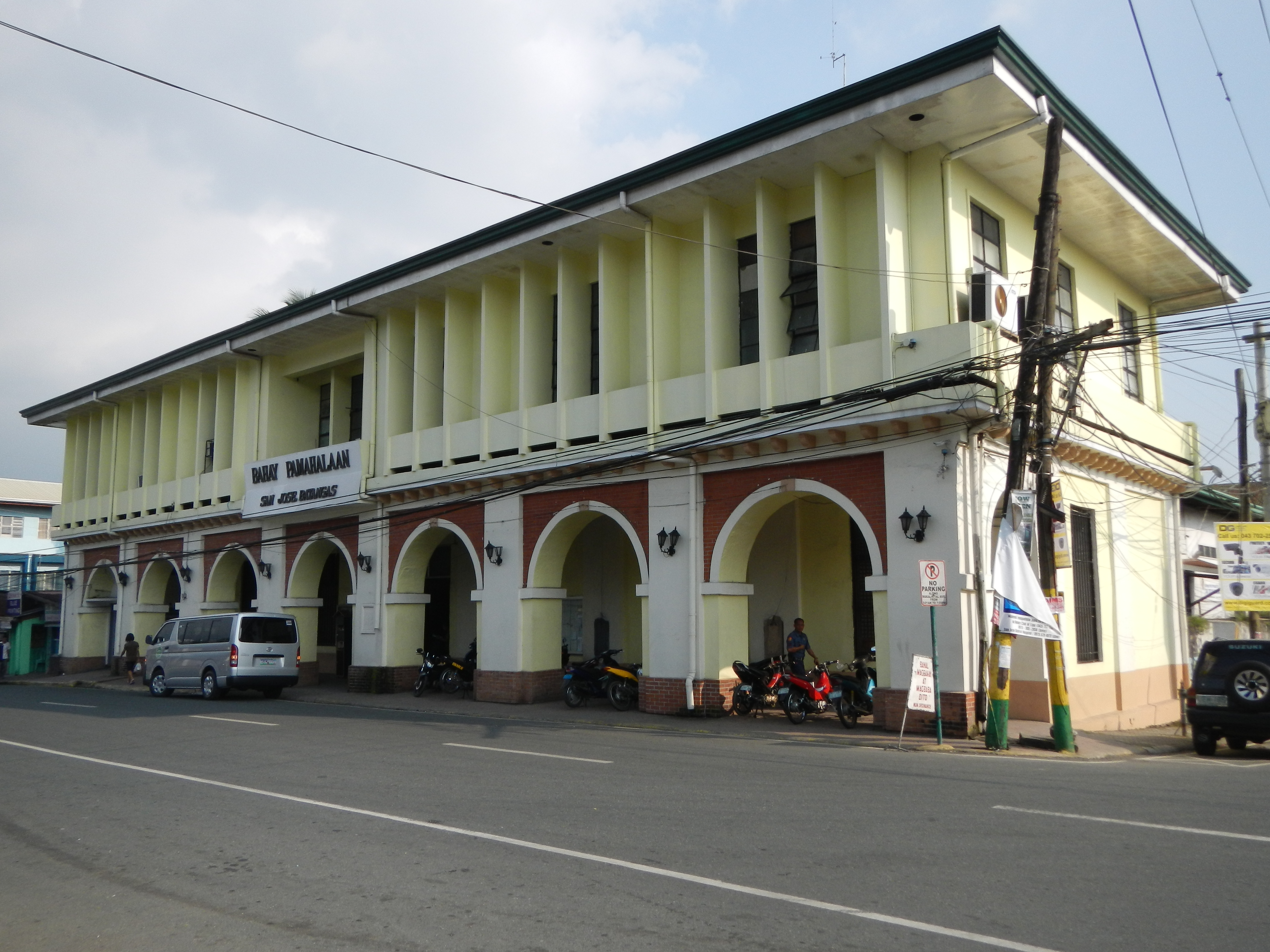
Old Municipal hall

Although currently called "Mayor", the Municipal Executive of San Jose has held other names including Gobernadorcillo which means "Governor" during the Spanish Period.

- Ignacio de los Santos (1767)
- Juan Bautista (1768)
- Juan Enrico (1769)
- Juan Masilang (1770)
- Jose Antonio (1771)
- Luis Isidro (1772 )
- Jose de la Cruz (1773)
- Ignacio de Mercado (1774)
- Domingo de los Santos (1775)
- Juan Magonza (1776)
- Miguel de los Santos (1777)
- Francisco Domingo (1778)
- Laureano Marquez (1779)
- Policarpio Kaponpon (1780)
- Francisco Aguila (1781)
- Antonio Robles (1782)
- Felipe Aguila (1783)
- Nicolas de los Santos (1784)
- Lorenzo Quizon (1785)
- Agustin Aguila (1786)
- Gabriel de Mercado (1787)
- Pedro Umali (1788)
- Domingo Dimaculangan (1789)
- Lucio Hernandez (1790)
- Bernardo Umali (1791)
- Ignacio de la Cruz (1792)
- Agustin de la Cruz (1793)
- Laureano Bautista (1794)
- Pascual Madlangbayan (1795)
- Martin Marquez (1796)
- Gregorio Morales (1797)
- Andres de Leon (1798)
- Diego Robles (1799)
- Hilario Mandigma (1800)
- Gregorio Leionardo (1801)
- Victoriano Isidro (1802)
- Pablo de los Santos (1803)
- Fulgencio Quizon (1804)
- Cristobal de los Santos (1805)
- Juan Tecson (1806)
- Nicolas Lopez (1807)
- Jose de la Cruz (1808)
- Mariano Tiburcio (1809)
- Jose Bautista (1810)
- Valentin Mercado (1811)
- Remigio Dimaculangan (1812)
- Tomas Quizon (1813)
- Cosme Bautista (1814)
- Santiago Castillo (1815)
- Apolinario Aguila (1816)
- Juan de la Cruz (1817)
- Patricio Virtucio (1818)
- Joaquin Enrico (1819)
- Francisco Quizon (1820)
- Juan Mercado (1821)
- Jose Marquez (1822)
- Martin de los Santos (1822)
- Manuel Mercado (1823)
- Bernabe Virtucio (1823)
- Timoteo Tiburcio (1824)
- Florentino Mendoza (1824)
- Juan Mendoza (1825)
- Hilario Aguila (1826)
- Lucas Hernandez (1827)
- Vicente Isidro (1828)
- Juan Quizon (1829)
- Carlos Mercado (1830)
- Esteban de la Cruz (1831)
- Bernardino Hernandez (1832)
- Geronimo Marquez (1833)
- Juan Marquez (1834)
- Hilario Aguila (1835)
- Felipe Aguila (1836)
- Agustin Quizon (1837)
- Vicente Bautista (1838)
- Romualdo de Ocampo (1839)
- Fernando de los Santos (1840)
- Jose de Villa (1841)
- Hilario Aguila (1842)
- Hilario Aguila (1843)
- Vicente Umali (1844)
- Segundo Leonardo (1845)
- Agaton Hernandez (1846)
- Pedro Quizon (1847)
- Juan Macalinga (1848)
- Julian Mitra (1849)
- Braulio de Luna (1850)
- Juan Javier (1851)
- Manuel Aguila (1852)
- Pascual Aguila (1853)
- Laureano Hernandez (1854)
- Ubaldo Hernandez (1855)
- Jose Ona y Gana (1856)
- Antonio Magpantay (1857)
- Manuel de Luna (1858)
- Francisco de Luna (1859)
- Bonifacio Robles (1860)
- Roman Ona y Ramos (1861)
- Pascual Aguila (1862)
- Nicolas de Villa (1863–64)
- Briccio Makalintal (1865–68)
- Camilio Aguila (1869–70)
- Baltazar Mercado (1871–72)
- Basilio Gozos (1873–74)
- Telesforo Hernandez (1875–76)
- Jorge Umali (1877–78)
- Simon Lopez (1879–80)
- Baltazar Mercado (1881–82)
- Andres Umali (1883–84)
- Isidro Marquez (1885–86)
- Remigio Aguila (1887–88)
- Rafael de Luna (1889)
- Ventura Aguila (1890–91)
- Salvador Aguila (1892–94)
- Juan Oblea (1895–1896)
- Ambrosio Makalintal (1897–98)
- Rafael de Luna (1899)
- Fernando Aguila (1900)
- Ambrosio Makalintal 1901-2
- Agaton Marquez (1903)
- Fernando Aguila (1904–5)
- Roman Kalalo (1906–7)
- Fernando Aguila (1908–9)
- Mariano de Villa (1910–11)
- Fernando Aguila (1912–14)
- Manuel Makalintal (1915)
- Fernando Aguila (1916)
- Paterno Aguila (1917–18)
- Vitaliano Luna (1919–21)
- Manuel Makalintal (1922–24)
- Daniel Luna (1925–27)
- Jose de Villa (1928–30)
- Fernando Aguila (1931–37)
- Vitaliano Luna (1938–40)
- Fernando Aguila (1941)
- Roman Kalalo (1942)
- Venancio Q. Remo (1943-45)
- Timoteo Alday (1946–47)
- Bonifacio Masilungan (1948–58)
- Primo Vergara (1959)
- Miguel Ambal Sr. (1960–63)
- Leonardo Ona Sr. (1964–67)
- Miguel Ambal Sr. (1968–72)
- Vicente Briones Kalalo (1972–1986)
- Edgardo Umali (1986–1987)
- Antonio Alday (1988–1992)
- Edgardo Umali (1992–2001)
- Ruben Guce (2001–2010)
- Entiquio Briones (2010–2016)
- Valentino 'Ben' Raz-Patron (2016–2025)
- Reggie A. Virtucio (2025-present)

== Tourism ==
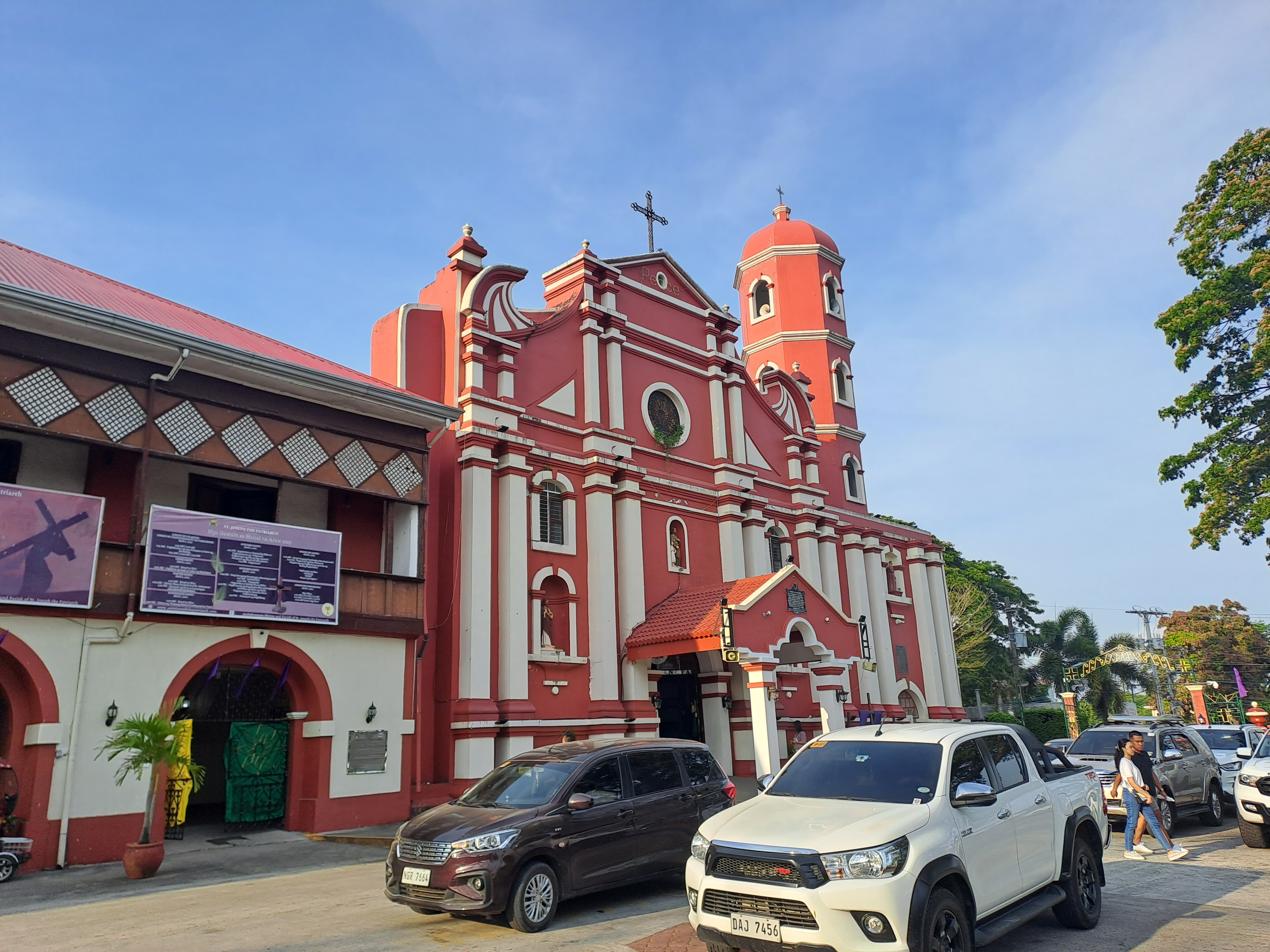
Archdiocesan Shrine of Saint Joseph the Patriarch

The Archdiocesan Shrine of Saint Joseph the Patriarch located in the town proper is a popular Catholic pilgrimage site. It was once built with cogon and bamboo by Augustinian friars around 1788. The present structure was built on 1812 under the supervision of a botanist Fr. Manuel Blanco. It has single-aisled interior which offers an unobstructed view of the large main altar. The altar is massive, with six rounded columns encircling the image of Saint Joseph. Outside a multi-tiered belfry stands which was built in the latter part of the 19th century; a bridge offers passage to the church over the Malaquing Tubig River.

San Jose is also home to the Oblates of Saint Joseph Mission and its Minor Seminary, founded by the Saint Joseph Marello. The Oblates were the first Italian congregation to send missionaries to the Philippines. San Jose became their first foreign mission, and is the center of the Vicariate X of the Archdiocese of Lipa.

San Jose celebrates Sinuam Festival every April 25 to commemorate its founding anniversary and to thank its patron for the good performance of the main business in the town which is Poultry.

== Infrastructure ==
The Southern Tagalog Arterial Road (STAR Tollway), an expressway that runs through the town, has an exit situated in the nearby Ibaan.

== Education ==
The San Jose Schools District Office governs all educational institutions within the municipality. It oversees the management and operations of all private and public, from primary to secondary schools.

=== Primary and elementary schools ===
- Aya Elementary School
- Bagong Pook Elementary School
- Balagtasin Elementary School
- Banaybanay 1 Elementary School
- Benigna Dimatatac Memorial Elementary School
- Bigain Elementary School
- Dagatan Elementary School
- Florencia A. Masilungan Memorial Elementary School
- Galamay-Amo Elementary School
- God's Grace Christian School of Bacoor
- Holy Family Montessori
- Lapolapo Elementary School
- Maranatha Christian Academy
- Padre Imo Luna Memorial Elementary School
- Pinagtungulan Elementary School
- Roman Ozaeta Memorial School
- Saint Joseph Academy
- Salaban Elementary School
- St. Anthony Montessori
- St. Claire School of Lipa Batangas
- St. Paul School of San Jose Batangas
- Taysan Elementary School
- Tugtug Elementary School

=== Secondary schools ===
- Bigain Integrated School
- Dr. Bonifacio A. Masilungan National High School
- Golden Key Integrated School of St. Joseph
- Marcos Espejo Integrated School
- Oblates of St. Joseph Minor Seminary
- Saint Joseph Academy of San Jose, Batangas Inc.
- Taysan National High School

=== Higher educational institution ===
- Dr. Concepcion A. Aguila Memorial College

== Notable personalities ==
- Querube C. Makalintal – Chief Justice of the Supreme Court (1973–1976), Speaker of the Batasang Pambansa (1978–1984) and Solicitor General (1954).
