= Mark Leviste =

Filipino politician (born 1977)

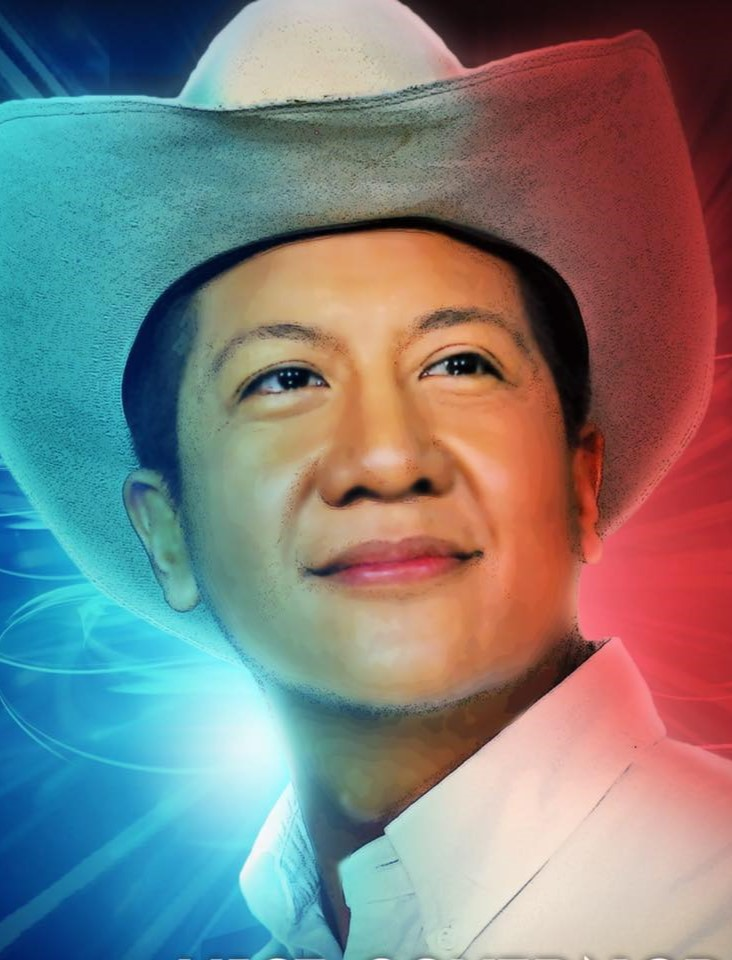

13th and 15th Vice Governor of Batangas
- In office June 30, 2019 – June 30, 2025
- Governor: Hermilando Mandanas
- Preceded by: Sofronio Ona, Jr.
- Succeeded by: Hermilando Mandanas
- In office June 30, 2007 – June 30, 2016
- Governor: Vilma Santos Recto
- Preceded by: Richard Recto
- Succeeded by: Sofronio Ona, Jr.

Member of the Batangas Provincial Board from the 4th district
- In office June 30, 2004 – June 30, 2007

Personal details
- Born: Jose Antonio Leviste II; December 25, 1977 (age 48) Makati, Philippines
- Party: Independent (2024–present)
- Other political affiliations: PDP (2016–2024); Liberal (2009–2016); Lakas–Kampi (2004–2007; 2008–2009); KAMPI (2007–2008)
- Children: 3
- Relatives: Antonio Leviste (uncle); Toni Leviste (cousin); Leandro Leviste (cousin)
- Education: De La Salle–College of Saint Benilde (BBA)

Jose Antonio "Mark" Sermonia Leviste II (born December 25, 1977) is a Filipino politician who served as Vice Governor of Batangas from 2007 to 2016 and from 2019 to 2025. He was elected as a Member of the Batangas Provincial Board, representing the 4th District, from 2004 to 2007. Before he became a board member, he served as the SK Councilor of Barangay Bel-Air, Makati from 1996 to 2002.

== Political career ==
After staying at Bel-Air, Makati, Leviste ran as a provincial board member in 2004, and after his term he ran as vice governor in 2007. He served as vice governor under Vilma Santos Recto's governorship until 2016. He ran again as vice governor in 2019 and served under Herminaldo "Dodo" Mandanas' governorship. In 2024, he expressed intention to run for governor with Mandanas as his running mate, but he withdrew his candidacy and chose to run for a House seat due to his "loyalty" to Santos Recto. Leviste lost to King Collantes at House election.

== Controversy ==
Known for supporting his alma mater's sister school, the La Salle Green Archers, he was involved in an altercation with Ateneo assistant coach Gabby Severino during Game 1 of the Finals of the 2016 UAAP Basketball tournament at the patron seats of Mall of Asia Arena. Leviste later recalled that Severino gave a dirty finger to La Salle player Ben Mbala, which angered him and prompted him to complain that Severino should have been called for a technical foul.

Later in the middle of the third quarter, Severino again allegedly made a dirty finger gesture toward him, prompting Leviste to confront Severino near the Ateneo bench. Leviste was subsequently escorted back to his seat by arena security personnel. Severino later admitted to and apologized for his actions.

== Personal life ==
In August 2020, Leviste tested positive for COVID-19. He was able to recover from the disease.

He had a relationship with actress Kris Aquino, but they broke up by 2024.

In January 2025, Leviste announced his relationship with TikTok artist Aira Lopez. Lopez stated that she did not have issue when he gave chocolates and flowers on Kris Aquino after a home visit.
