= Caloy Bolilia =

Filipino politician (born 1966)

Amado Carlos Bolilia IV
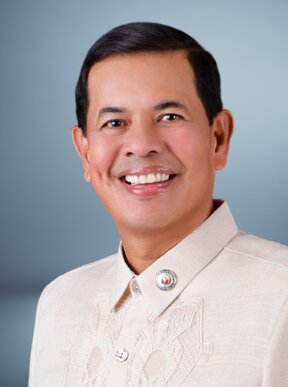
- Official portrait, 2025

Member of the Philippine House of Representatives from Batangas's 4th district
- Incumbent
- Assumed office June 30, 2025
- Preceded by: Lianda Bolilia

Member of the Batangas Provincial Board from the 4th district
- In office June 30, 2010 – June 30, 2016

Personal details
- Born: November 3, 1966 (age 59) Padre Garcia, Batangas, Philippines
- Party: Nacionalista (2018–present)
- Other political affiliations: Liberal (2009–2018)
- Spouse: Lianda Brucal
- Occupation: Politician, former media personality

Amado Carlos Alzola Bolilia IV (born November 3, 1966), also known as Caloy Bolilia, is a Filipino politician and former media personality who is the representative of Batangas's 4th congressional district in the House of Representatives of the Philippines since 2025. He is affiliated with the Nacionalista Party and won the seat during the 2025 Philippine general election, succeeding his wife, Lianda Bolilia, who was term-limited after serving three consecutive terms. He previously served as a Batangas Provincial Board member from 2010 to 2016 and unsuccessfully ran for vice governor of Batangas in 2016.

== Early life and education ==
Bolilia was born in Padre Garcia, Batangas. Before entering politics, he was known as a media personality and was involved in various public service and development programs.

== Political career ==
Bolilia served as a member of the Batangas Provincial Board from the 4th district for two consecutive terms from 2010 to 2016. He later ran for vice governor of Batangas in 2016 as the running mate of gubernatorial candidate and vice governor Mark Leviste. However, they both lost.

In the 2025 elections, he was elected representative of 4th district of Batangas, succeeding his term-limited wife Lianda Bolilia.

== Personal life ==
Bolilia is married to Lianda Brucal-Bolilla, who also served as a congressional representative of the same district from 2016 to 2025.
