= Lianda Bolilia =

Filipino politician (born 1963)

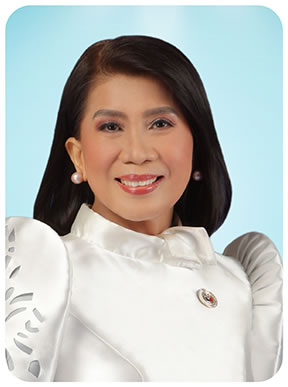

Member of the House of Representatives of the Philippines
- In office June 30, 2016 – June 30, 2025
- Preceded by: Mark Llandro Mendoza
- Succeeded by: Caloy Bolilia
- Constituency: Batangas's 4th congressional district

Member of the Batangas Provincial Board from the 4th District
- In office June 30, 1998 – June 30, 2007

Personal details
- Born: Lianda Brucal; March 13, 1963 (age 63)
- Party: Nacionalista (2018–present)
- Other political affiliations: Lakas (1998–2009); Liberal (2009–2018)
- Spouse: Amado Carlos Bolilia IV
- Children: 2
- Education: Polytechnic University of the Philippines (BA); Philippine Women’s University (MPA)

Lianda Brucal-Bolilia (born March 13, 1963) is a Filipino politician who was a member of the House of Representatives. She represented Batangas's 4th congressional district from 2016 to 2025.

== See also ==
- List of female members of the House of Representatives of the Philippines
