= Batangas's 4th congressional district =

House of Representatives of the Philippines legislative district

- Constituency for the House of Representatives of the Philippines
- Map Boundary of Batangas's 4th congressional district
- Location of Batangas within the Philippines
- Province: Batangas
- Region: Calabarzon
- Population: 472,794 (2020)
- Electorate: 307,973 (2022)
- Major settlements: 6 LGUs: Municipalities; Ibaan; Padre Garcia; Rosario; San Jose; San Juan; Taysan
- Area: 757.69 km^{2} (292.55 sq mi)

Current constituency
- Created: 1987
- Representative: Caloy Bolilia
- Political party: Nacionalista
- Congressional bloc: Majority

Batangas's 4th congressional district is one of the six congressional districts of the Philippines in the province of Batangas. It has been represented in the House of Representatives of the Philippines since 1987. The district consists of the eastern Batangas municipalities of Ibaan, Padre Garcia, Rosario, San Jose, San Juan, and Taysan. The city of Lipa was also part of this district until it was granted its own representation as the sixth district effective 2016. It is currently represented in the 20th Congress by Caloy Bolilia of the Nacionalista Party (NP).

== Representation history ==
#	Image	Member	Term of office		Legislature	Party	Electoral history	Constituent LGUs
#	Image	Member	Start	End	Legislature	Party	Electoral history	Constituent LGUs
=== Batangas's 4th district for the House of Representatives of the Philippines ===
District created February 2, 1987.
1		Jose E. Calingasan	June 30, 1987	June 30, 1992	8th	LDP	Elected in 1987.	1987–2016; Ibaan, Lipa, Padre Garcia, Rosario, San Jose, San Juan, Taysan
2		Ralph G. Recto	June 30, 1992	June 30, 2001	9th	Nacionalista	Elected in 1992.	1987–2016; Ibaan, Lipa, Padre Garcia, Rosario, San Jose, San Juan, Taysan
2		Ralph G. Recto	June 30, 1992	June 30, 2001	10th	Lakas	Re-elected in 1995.	1987–2016; Ibaan, Lipa, Padre Garcia, Rosario, San Jose, San Juan, Taysan
2		Ralph G. Recto	June 30, 1992	June 30, 2001	11th	Lakas	Re-elected in 1998.	1987–2016; Ibaan, Lipa, Padre Garcia, Rosario, San Jose, San Juan, Taysan
3		Oscar L. Gozos	June 30, 2001	June 30, 2007	12th	Lakas	Elected in 2001.	1987–2016; Ibaan, Lipa, Padre Garcia, Rosario, San Jose, San Juan, Taysan
3		Oscar L. Gozos	June 30, 2001	June 30, 2007	13th	KAMPI	Re-elected in 2004.	1987–2016; Ibaan, Lipa, Padre Garcia, Rosario, San Jose, San Juan, Taysan
4		Mark Llandro Mendoza	June 30, 2007	June 30, 2016	14th	NPC	Elected in 2007.	1987–2016; Ibaan, Lipa, Padre Garcia, Rosario, San Jose, San Juan, Taysan
4		Mark Llandro Mendoza	June 30, 2007	June 30, 2016	15th	NPC	Re-elected in 2010.	1987–2016; Ibaan, Lipa, Padre Garcia, Rosario, San Jose, San Juan, Taysan
4		Mark Llandro Mendoza	June 30, 2007	June 30, 2016	16th	NPC	Re-elected in 2013.	1987–2016; Ibaan, Lipa, Padre Garcia, Rosario, San Jose, San Juan, Taysan
5		Lianda Bolilia	June 30, 2016	June 30, 2025	17th	Liberal	Elected in 2016.	2016–present Ibaan, Padre Garcia, Rosario, San Jose, San Juan, Taysan
5		Lianda Bolilia	June 30, 2016	June 30, 2025	18th	Nacionalista	Re-elected in 2019.	2016–present Ibaan, Padre Garcia, Rosario, San Jose, San Juan, Taysan
5		Lianda Bolilia	June 30, 2016	June 30, 2025	19th	Nacionalista	Re-elected in 2022.	2016–present Ibaan, Padre Garcia, Rosario, San Jose, San Juan, Taysan
6		Caloy Bolilia	June 30, 2025	Incumbent	20th	Nacionalista	Elected in 2025.	2016–present Ibaan, Padre Garcia, Rosario, San Jose, San Juan, Taysan

== Election results ==
=== 2025 ===
2025 Philippine House of Representatives elections
Party	Candidate	Votes	%
Nacionalista	Caloy Bolilia	142,884	52.14%
Independent	JP Gozos	126,636	46.21%
Lakas	Ronald Umali	4,527	1.65%
Total votes		274,047	100.00%
Nacionalista hold			

=== 2022 ===
2022 Philippine House of Representatives elections
Party	Candidate	Votes	%
Nacionalista	Lianda Bolilia	184,163	73.06%
NPC	Victor Portugal, Jr.	67,915	26.94%
Total votes		252,078	100.00%
Nacionalista hold			

=== 2019 ===
2019 Philippine House of Representatives elections
Party	Candidate	Votes	%
Nacionalista	Lianda Bolilia	124,036	55.48%
NPC	Mark L. Mendoza	99,500	44.51%
Total votes		223,536	100.00%
Nacionalista hold			

=== 2016 ===
2016 Philippine House of Representatives elections
Party	Candidate	Votes	%
Liberal	Lianda Bolilia	110,485	50.29
NPC	Victor Portugal, Jr.	91,392	41.60
Total votes		219,688	100.00
Liberal gain from NPC			

=== 2013 ===
2013 Philippine House of Representatives elections
Party	Candidate	Votes	%
NPC	Mark L. Mendoza	161,131	60.90
UNA	Bernadette Sabili	103,446	39.10
Total votes		279,824	100.00
NPC hold			

=== 2010 ===
2010 Philippine House of Representatives elections
Party	Candidate	Votes	%
NPC	Mark L. Mendoza	248,891	94.60
PMP	Praxedes Bustamante	14,179	5.40
Total votes		299,518	100
NPC hold			

=== 2007 ===
2007 Philippine House of Representatives elections
Party	Candidate	Votes	%
NPC	Mark Llandro Mendoza	97,218	45.73%
LDP	Meynardo Sabili	90,184	42.43%
Lakas	Richard Recto	25,190	11.85%
Total votes		212,592	100.00%
NPC gain from LDP			

== See also ==
- Legislative districts of Batangas
