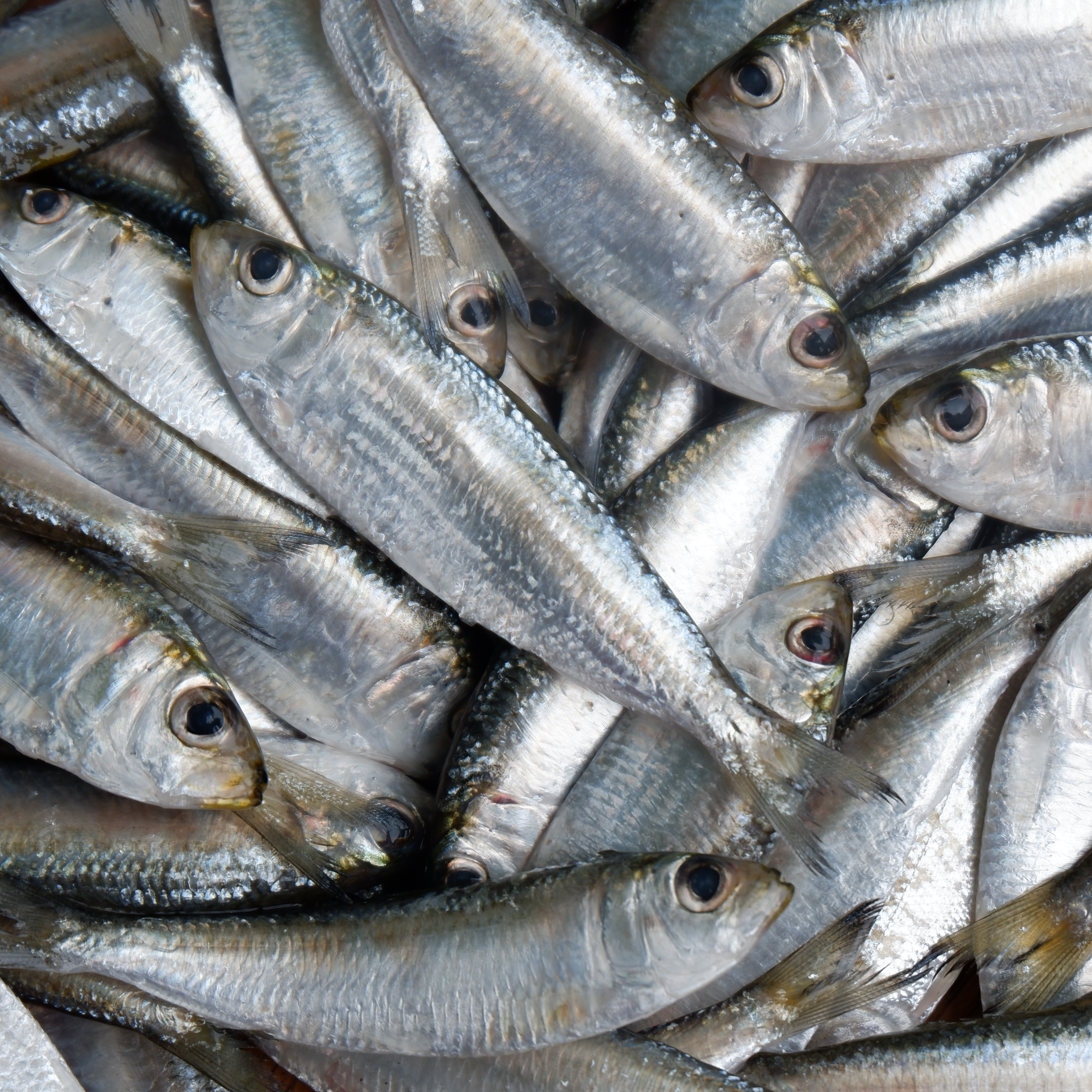
- Sardinella tawilis being sold in a market.

Conservation status
- Endangered (IUCN 3.1)

Scientific classification
- Kingdom: Animalia
- Phylum: Chordata
- Class: Actinopterygii
- Division: Teleostei
- Order: Clupeiformes
- Family: Dorosomatidae
- Genus: Sardinella
- Species: S. tawilis

Binomial name
- Sardinella tawilis (Herre, 1927)

Synonyms
- Harengula tawilis Herre, 1927

= Sardinella tawilis =

Species of fish

Sardinella tawilis (the freshwater sardinella, freshwater herring, bombon sardine or freshwater sardine) is a freshwater sardine found exclusively in the Philippines. It is the only member of the genus Sardinella known to exist entirely in fresh water. Locally, they are known in Filipino as tawilis.

S. tawilis is listed in the Ark of Taste international catalogue of endangered heritage foods of Philippine cuisine by the Slow Food movement.

In January 2019, the International Union for Conservation of Nature declared S. tawilis an endangered species.

== Etymology and taxonomic history ==
Sardinella is the diminutive of the Greek sarda, meaning literally "little sardine".

The species was originally identified and named in 1927 as Harengula tawilis by Albert William Herre, the Chief of the Fisheries Division of the Bureau of Science in Manila. The species was later moved to the more appropriate and taxonomically accurate genus, Sardinella.

== Description ==
S. tawilis is a small fish reaching up to 15 cm and weighing less than 30 g. Like other members of their family, they have laterally compressed bodies with bellies covered in tough, scale-like scutes. They have a single, triangular dorsal fin and a forked caudal fin. They possess long, slender gill rakers in their mouths.

== Range and distribution ==
S. tawilis populations are only found in Taal Lake in the Batangas province on the island of Luzon in the Philippines. Taal Lake is the third-largest lake in the Philippines and is located in the caldera of Taal Volcano. It has an area of about 24,356.4 hectares (60,186 acres) and lies at nine municipalities and two cities. Near its center lies the 23.8-square-kilometer (9.2 sq mi) Volcano Island which has a 1.9-kilometer (1.2 mi) crater lake in the middle. The lake has a maximum depth of 180 meters (590 ft) and an average depth of 65 meters (213 ft). Before recent history, the lake was but an extension of the entirely marine Balayan Bay, connected by a channel that narrowed through time and transpired as a river. Major eruptions in the 18th century essentially sealed the lake from the sea, eventually leading its waters to become fresh water. S. tawilis is believed to be one of a few former marine species trapped within the lake that have evolved into purely freshwater species.

== Ecology ==
S. tawilis, like members of its family, is an epipelagic filter feeder, using its gill rakers to strain plankton from the water while it swims with its mouth open. They roam the lake in large schools, just below the surface as the volcanic (and thus sedimentary) nature of the lake limits their plankton food to the surface.

The freshwater sardinella prefers to ingest larger prey, such as adult copepods, supplemented with rotifers and water fleas. During the summer months when the density of smaller copepods were much higher, their stomach contents consisted primarily of calanoid copepods, which are larger than the copepods blooming during this time. This suggests some partial control over prey selection exhibited by the fish, as opposed to simple filter-feeding.

Little is known about their reproduction. It is known that the Taal population spawns during the months of April to July, when surface temperatures are highest.

The reproduction of the species saw a decline after the eruption of Taal Volcano in 2020.

== Importance to humans ==
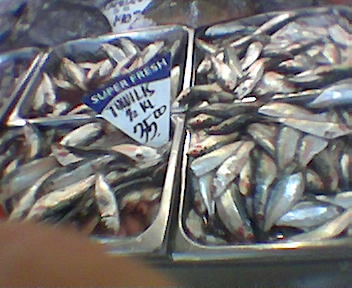
Bins of S. tawilis for sale at a Metro Manila supermarket

Despite its threatened status, stocks in Lake Taal have been commercially fished for several decades. The fish is a widely popular food fish in the Philippines, and tons are shipped to most of the major cities in the country. Local supermarkets and wet markets usually have a tray or pile dedicated solely to the species.

The species is commonly referred to as tawilis in the local language of Tagalog. On the island of Cebu, one of the many places where tawilis is shipped, the native Cebuano name for the fish is tunsoy.

In addition to raw consumption, tawilis is also processed into various food products. It is one of the many fish species dried, salted, and sold as daing in the country. They are also smoked and bottled in oil, and sold commercially.

In literature, Jose Rizal used three dried tawilis in his novel Noli Me Tangere to symbolize the Three Martyred Priests of Bagumbayan (Jose Burgos, Jacinto Zamora and Mariano Gomez).

== Conservation ==
Because of several factors, the species is threatened by overfishing. As with all species consisting of a single population in one location, a local extinction event will lead to species extinction. As the population of the Philippines grows, the demand will be greater for tawilis, possibly overfishing the lake's stock population. According to the IUCN Red List report which conducted last 28 February 2017 and published in 2018, the catch of the tawilis started to decline since 1998 due to overfishing, illegal use of active fishing gears, increasing use of fish cages, and the deterioration of the water quality in Taal Lake. The harvest of the tawilis has said to declined by at least 50 percent over the past 10 years. Because of this, the IUCN listed the tawilis as endangered.

In February 2021, some tawilis were taken out of Taal Lake due to Taal Volcano's increasing volcanic activity. The conservation project led and funded by the Department of Science and Technology's Council for Agriculture, Aquatic, and Natural Resources Research and Development resettled the tawilis at University of the Philippines Los Baños's Limnological Station.

== Sources ==
- "Sardinella tawilis". Integrated Taxonomic Information System.
- Whitehead, Peter J.P. (1985). "FAO species catalogue. Vol. 7. Clupeoid fishes of the world (suborder Clupeioidei). An annotated and illustrated catalogue of the herrings, sardines, pilchards, sprats, shads, anchovies and wolf-herrings. Part 1 – Chirocentridae, Clupeidae and Pristigasteridae". FAO Fisheries Synopsis. 125 (7/1). Rome, Italy: Food and Agriculture Organization of the United Nations: 1–303. ISBN 92-5-102340-9.
