= Pansipit =

Pansipit may refer to:

- Pansipit River, Philippines
- Pansipit (barangay) in Agoncillo, Batangas, Philippines
