= Taal Basilica =

Roman Catholic church in Batangas, Philippines

- Minor Basilica and Parish of Saint Martin of Tours
- Basilika Minor at Parokya ni San Martin ng Tours (Filipino); Basílica Menor y Parroquia de San Martín de Tours (Spanish)
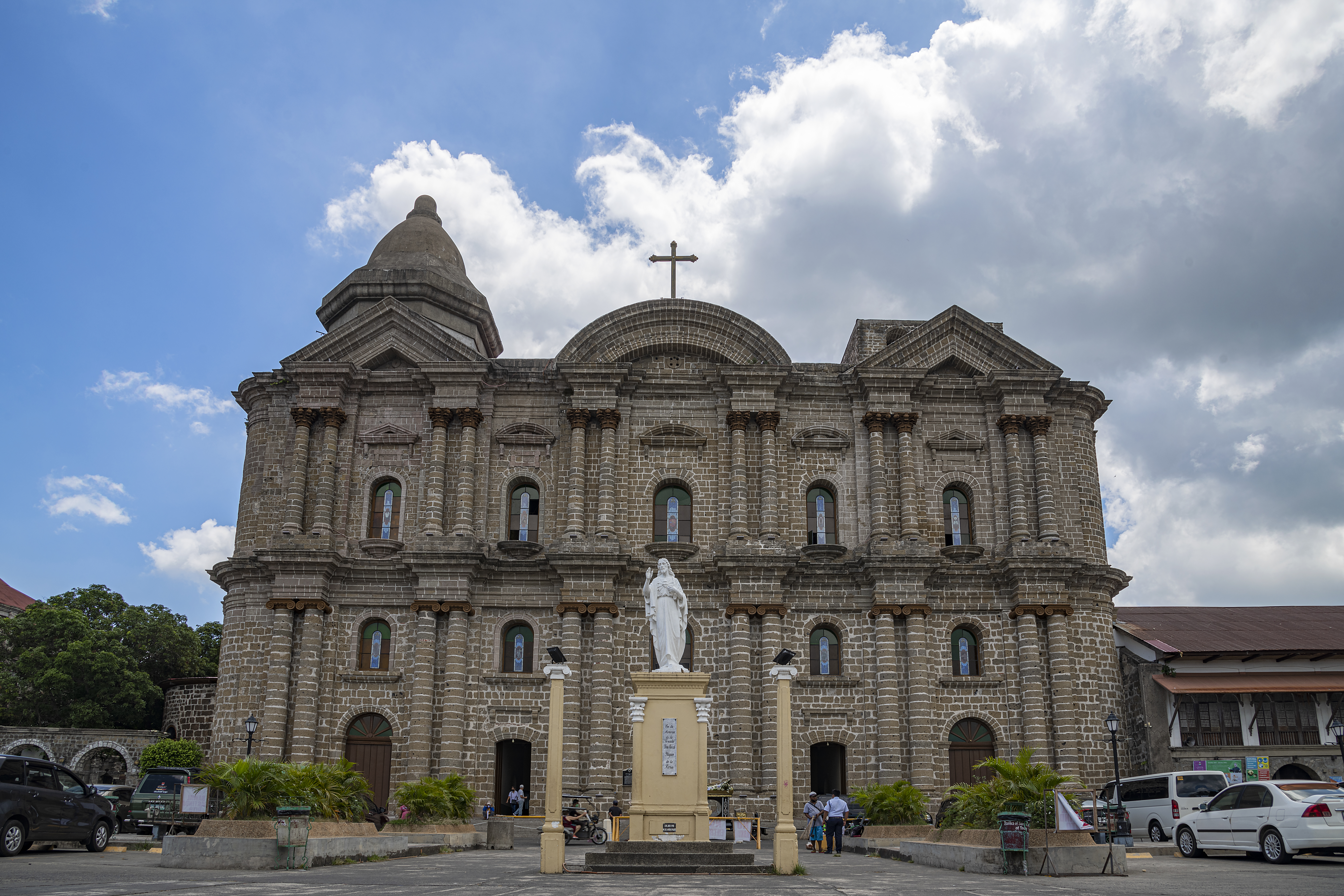
- Basilica facade in 2022

- Location in Luzon Location in the Philippines
- 13°52′51″N 120°55′29″E
- Location: Taal, Batangas
- Country: Philippines
- Denomination: Catholic Church
- Sui iuris church: Latin Church

History
- Status: Minor Basilica
- Founded: 1575; 451 years ago
- Founder: Augustinians
- Dedication: Saint Martin of Tours
- Consecrated: 1865; 161 years ago

Architecture
- Functional status: Active
- Heritage designation: National Historical Landmark
- Designated: January 14, 1974
- Architect: Luciano Oliver
- Architectural type: Cruciform basilica
- Style: Italian Baroque
- Groundbreaking: 1856; 170 years ago
- Completed: 1878; 148 years ago

Specifications
- Length: 88.6 m (291 ft)
- Width: 48 m (157 ft)

Administration
- Province: Lipa
- Metropolis: Lipa
- Archdiocese: Lipa
- Deanery: Saint John the Evangelist

Clergy
- Rector: Conrado G. Castillo

National Historical Landmarks
- Designated: January 14, 1974
- Reference no.: No. 375, s. 1974

The Minor Basilica and Parish of Saint Martin of Tours, commonly known as Taal Basilica, is a minor basilica in the town of Taal, Batangas, within the Archdiocese of Lipa in the Philippines. It is considered to be the largest church building in the country, and the largest Augustinian church, standing 88.6 meters (291 ft) long and 48 meters (157 ft) wide. Martin of Tours is the patron saint of Taal, whose feast is celebrated every November 11.

== History ==
=== Earlier churches ===
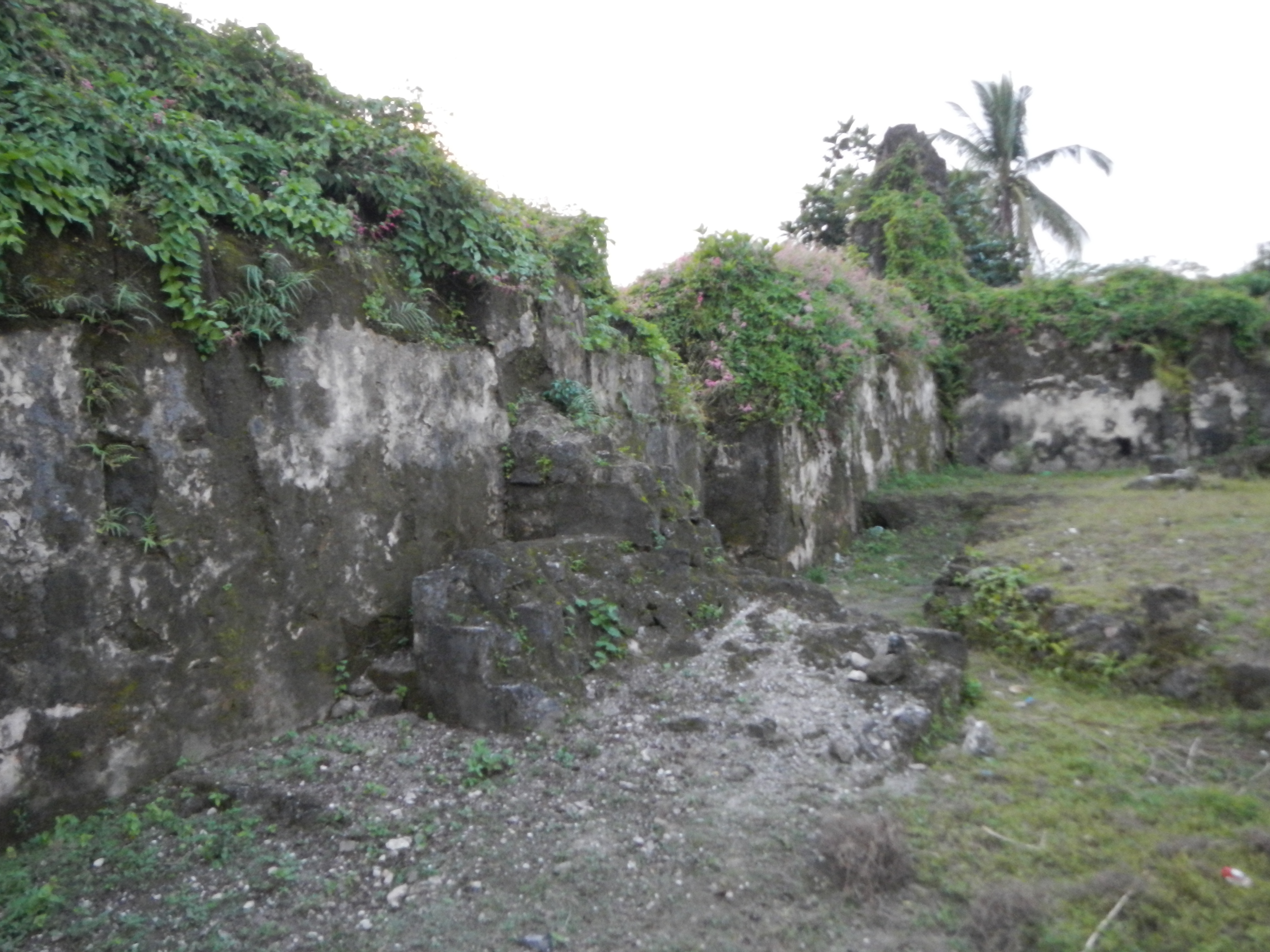
Ruins of the old church in San Nicolas

In 1575, three years after the founding of the town of Taal in its old site near the shores of Taal Lake, work began on the construction of its first church by Diego Espinar with Martin of Tours as patron saint. The church was rebuilt in 1642 using stronger materials, but it was destroyed in 1754 along with the town of Taal in the largest recorded eruption of the Taal Volcano. This event led to transfer of the town and the church farther away from the volcano to its present site atop an elevated hill facing Balayan Bay. The ruins of the previous church can still be seen in the present-day town of San Nicolas.

Martín Aguirre donated the land and began the construction of the new church in 1755. It was continued by Gabriel Rodriguez in 1777 and by Jose Victoria in 1782. Ramon del Marco decorated the church, built the convent, and paved the "processional" road with bricks around the atrium of the parochial building. This church was damaged by a strong earthquake on September 16, 1852, centered near the Taal Volcano, though no volcanic eruption was recorded.

=== Present church ===
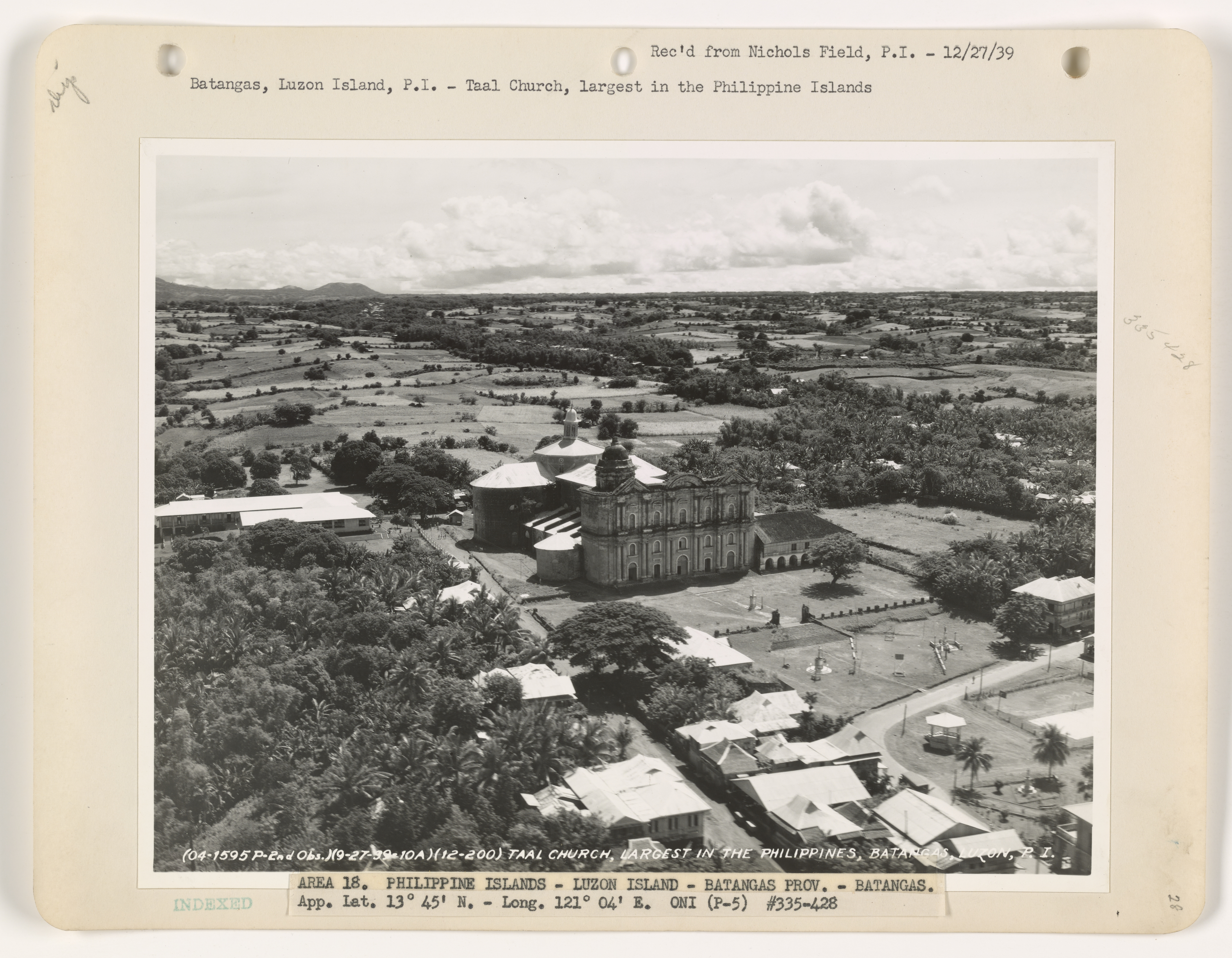
Aerial view of the church, 1939

Construction of the present church began in 1856 by Marcos Antón with Spanish architect Luciano Oliver, commissioned to design and manage the construction of the new church. Although it was unfinished, it was inaugurated in 1865. The huge church was completed by Agapito Aparicio in 1878.

The church was then restored in 1953 in preparation for the canonical coronation of Our Lady of Caysasay. The following year on December 8, 1954, the church was declared as a minor basilica, the third in the country to be given such honor.

The church was again restored in 1972 by the Taal Quadricentennial Council for the 400th anniversary of the town's establishment. By Presidential Decree No. 375 on January 14, 1974, the church was declared a national historical landmark.

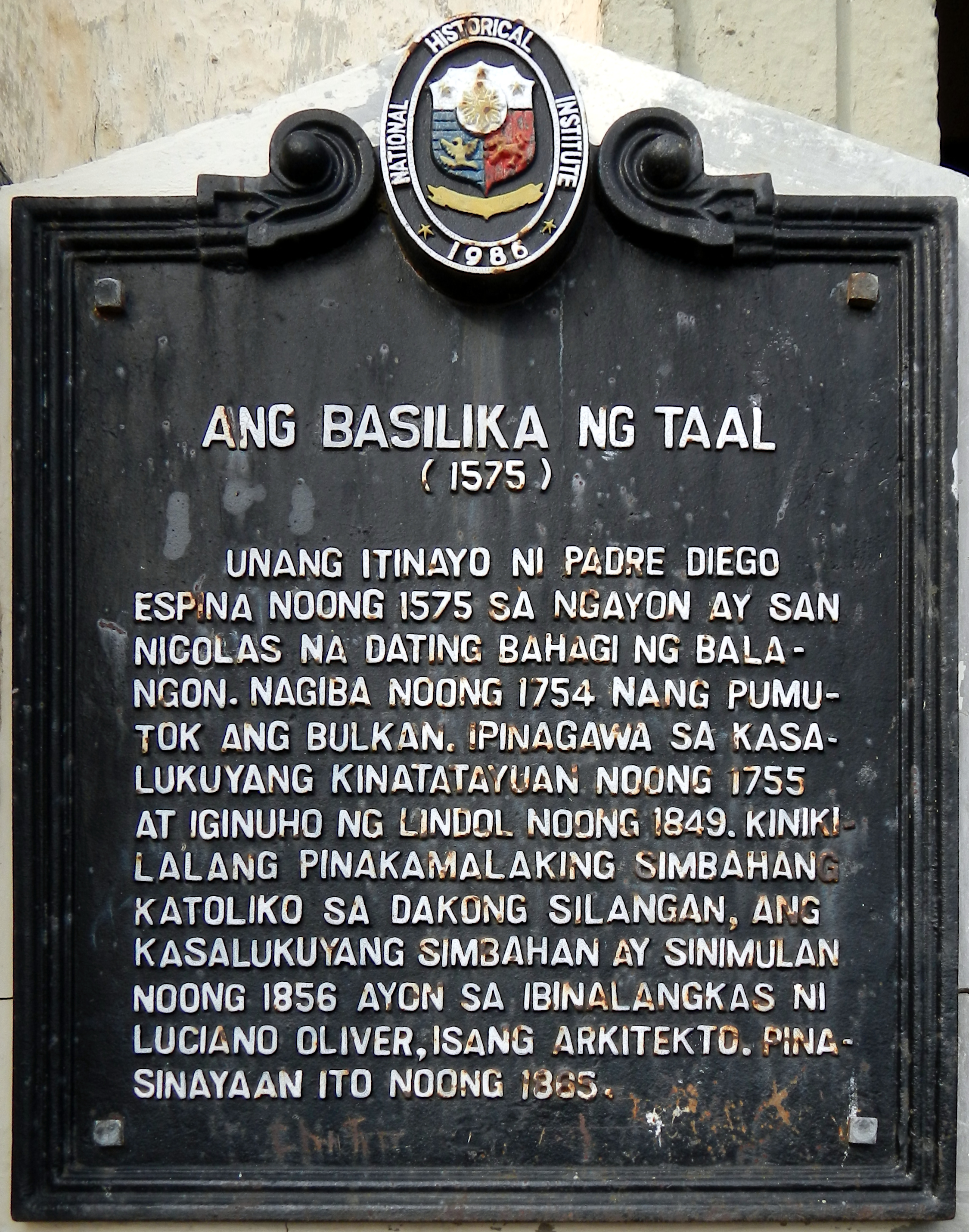
Church NHI historical marker installed in 1986

The old belfry was later rebuilt in 1990 under the supervision of the National Historical Institute.

In 2011, upon the assignment of Alfredo Madlangbayan, the basilica underwent another renovation as sections the church interior were repainted to match its original trompe l'oeil ceilings. The tower was also modified to imitate the old tower destroyed by the earthquake of 1942, and a new set of carillon bells was later installed. The renovations were completed in November that same year.

On April 4, 2017, the basilica was damaged by a magnitude-5.5 earthquake that struck Tingloy. The basilica was significantly damaged further by twin earthquakes (magnitudes 5.6 and 6.0) that struck the neighboring towns of Mabini and Taysan that occurred four days later on April 8. This, along with the Taal Volcano eruption on January 12–22, 2020 covering the basilica in ash, led to a restoration by the NHCP. Once finished, it turned over the newly restored basilica to the Archdiocese of Lipa on November 11 of the latter year.

On April 8, 2025, a man was arrested for desecrating the basilica. The suspect was caught on CCTV cameras driving his motorcycle inside the church and desecrating the high altar.

== Architecture and design ==
The basilica is built on the Italian Baroque architecture style on a Latin cross (cruciform) layout. It was meant to have a similar look as Augustinian Churches, meaning not the brown color but a more silver color, as used in the original altar of the Church in San Nicolas, Batangas. The stone church has three naves with a grand transept and an elegant façade with Ionic and Doric orders. A small tower on the left side of the façade contained the large church bell, which in 1942 was destroyed by an earthquake.

The basilica is 88.6 meters (291 ft) long and 48 meters (157 ft) wide, making it the largest in the Philippines. The façade is 28 meters (92 ft) high, while the cupola is 44.5 meters (146 ft) high. It also has a 15.5-meter (51 ft) nave.

Agapito Aparicio added a Doric altar with a height of 24 meters (79 ft) and a width of 10 meters (33 ft). He was also responsible for the baptistery made with tiles imported from Europe.

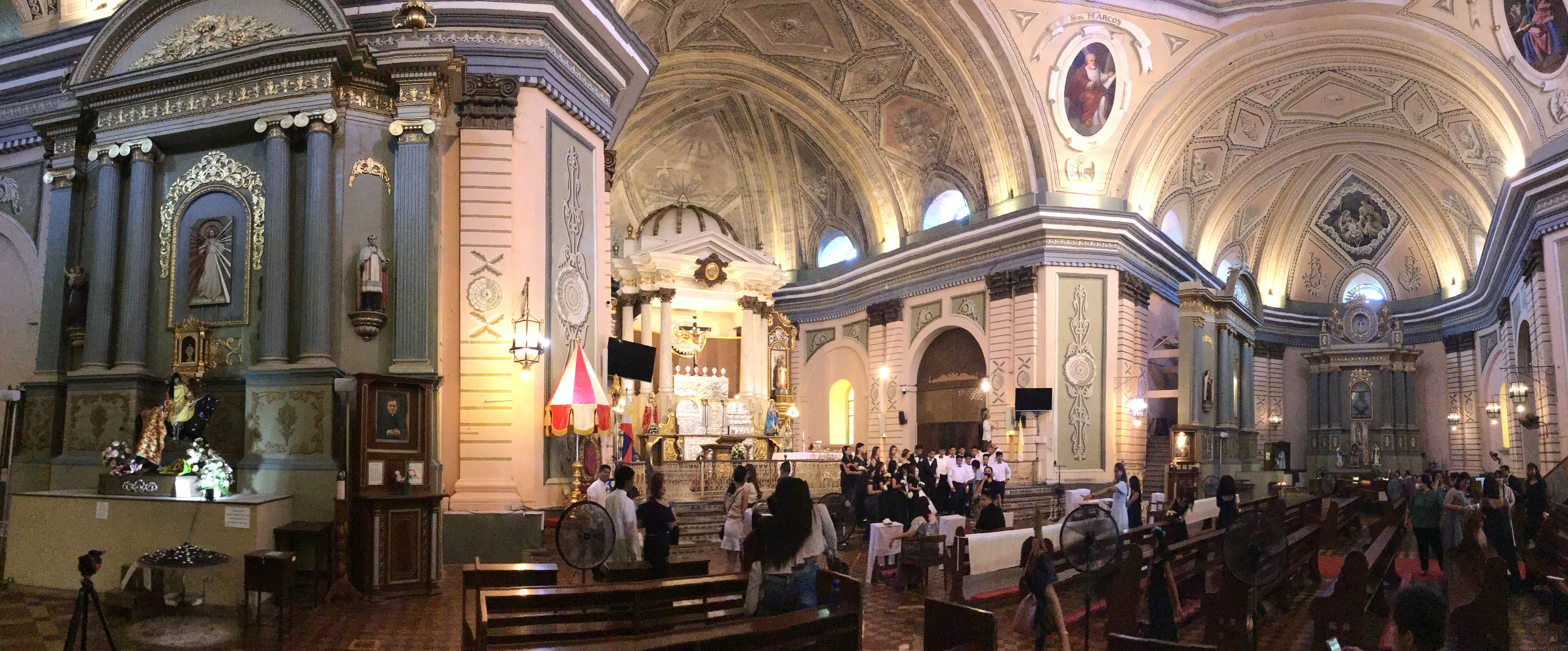
Panorama of the transepts, crossing, and apse

== Gallery ==
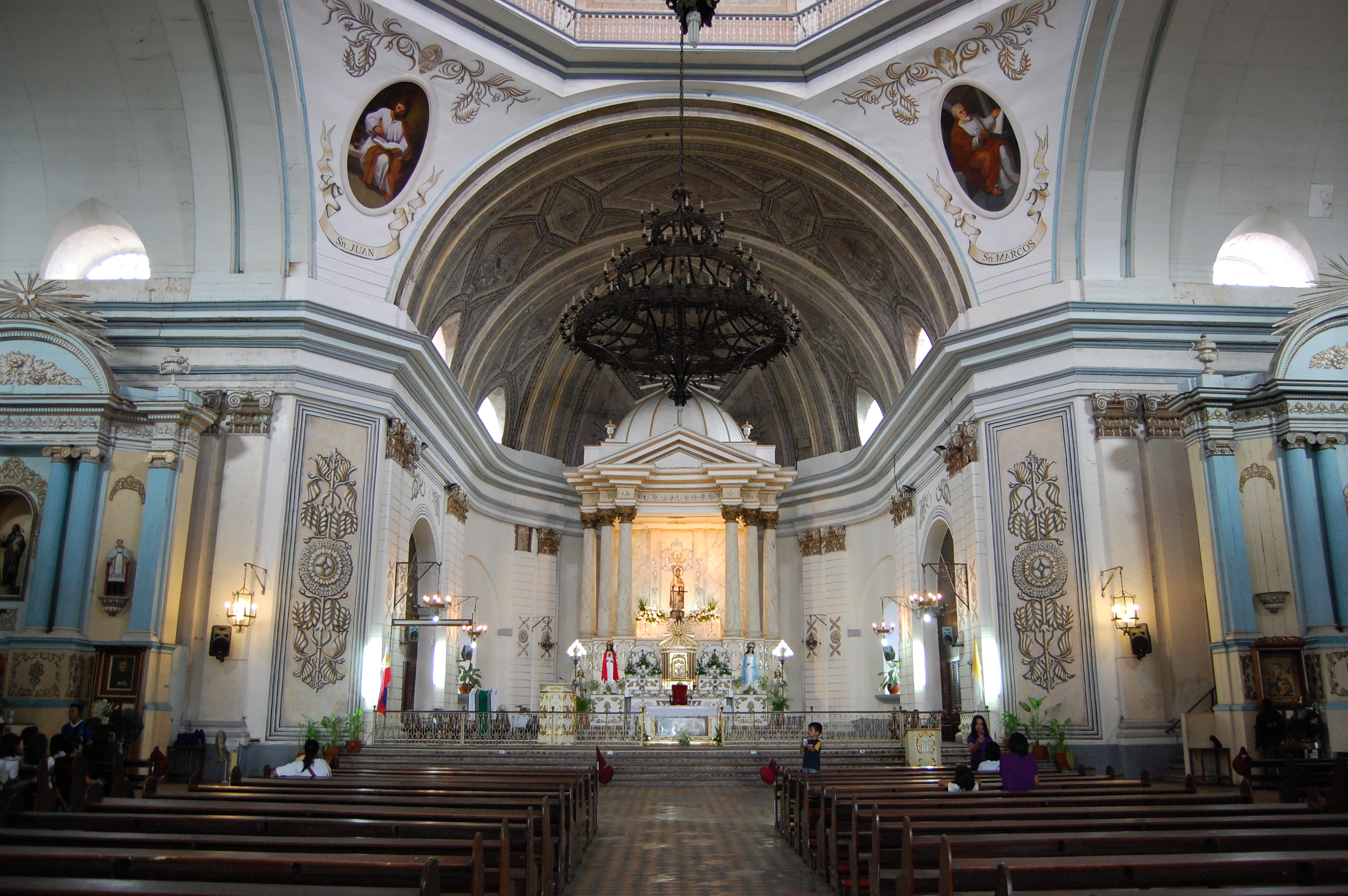
The sanctuary in 2009

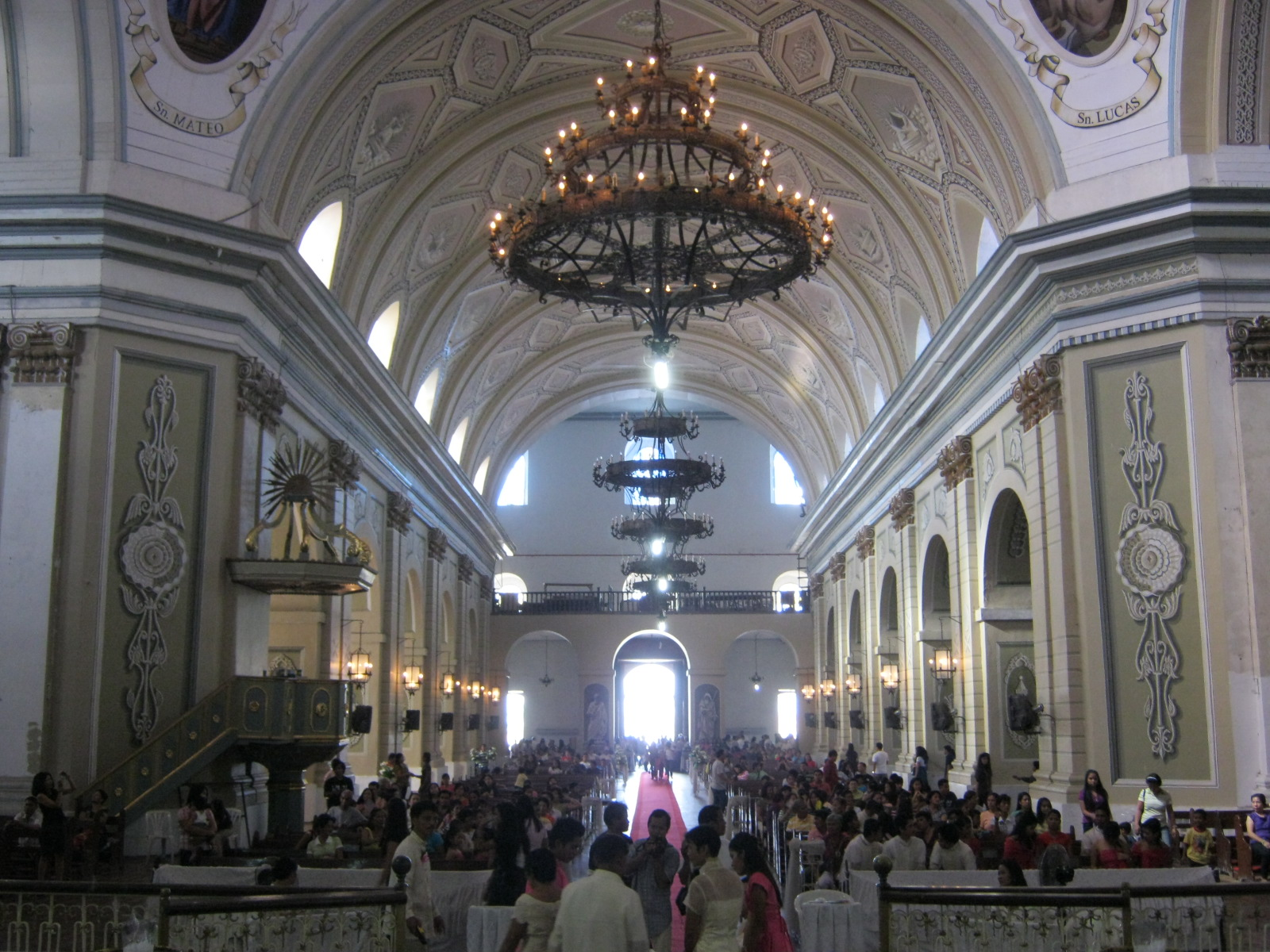
The nave in 2011 viewed from the main sanctuary

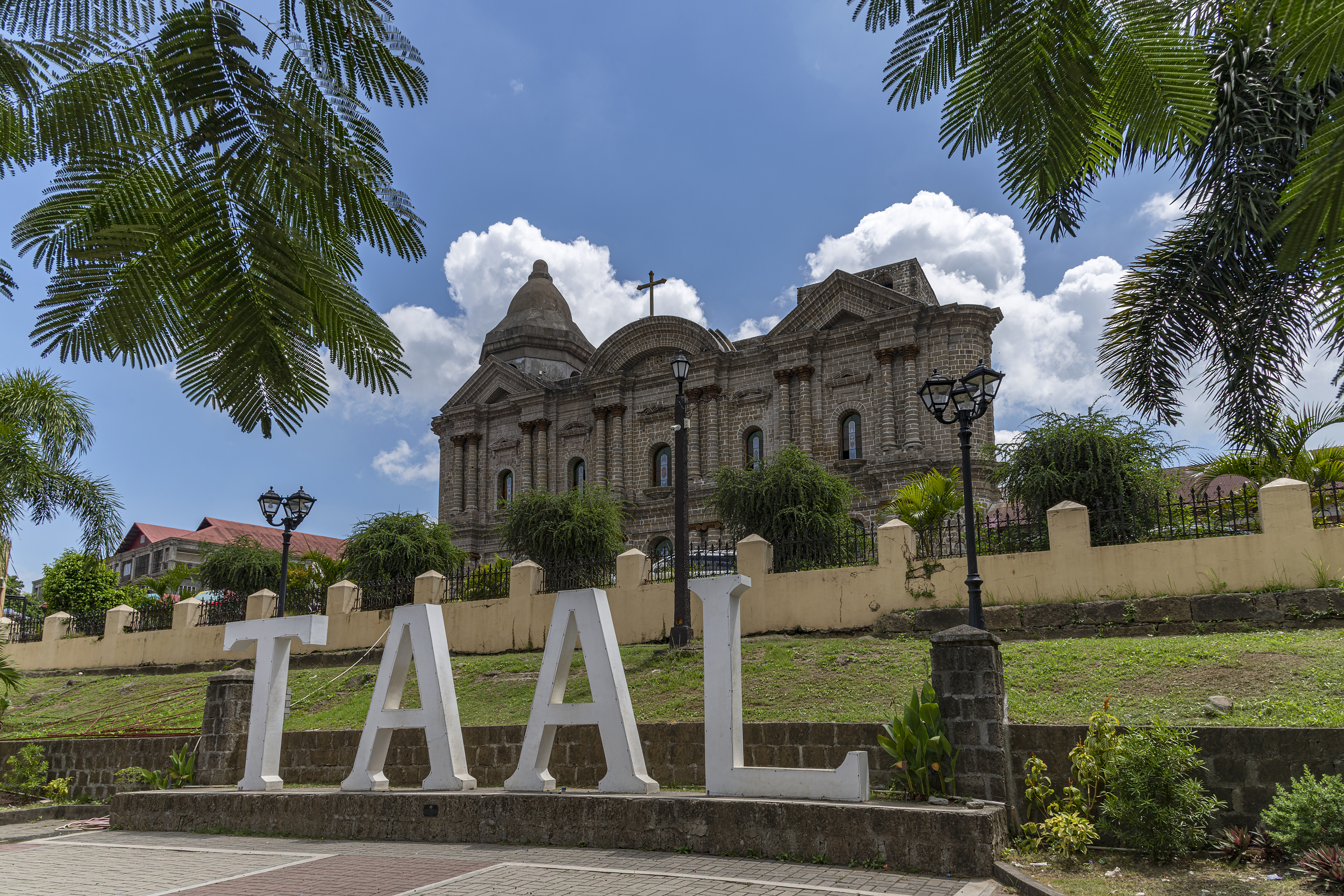
Church façade and Taal Park in the foreground

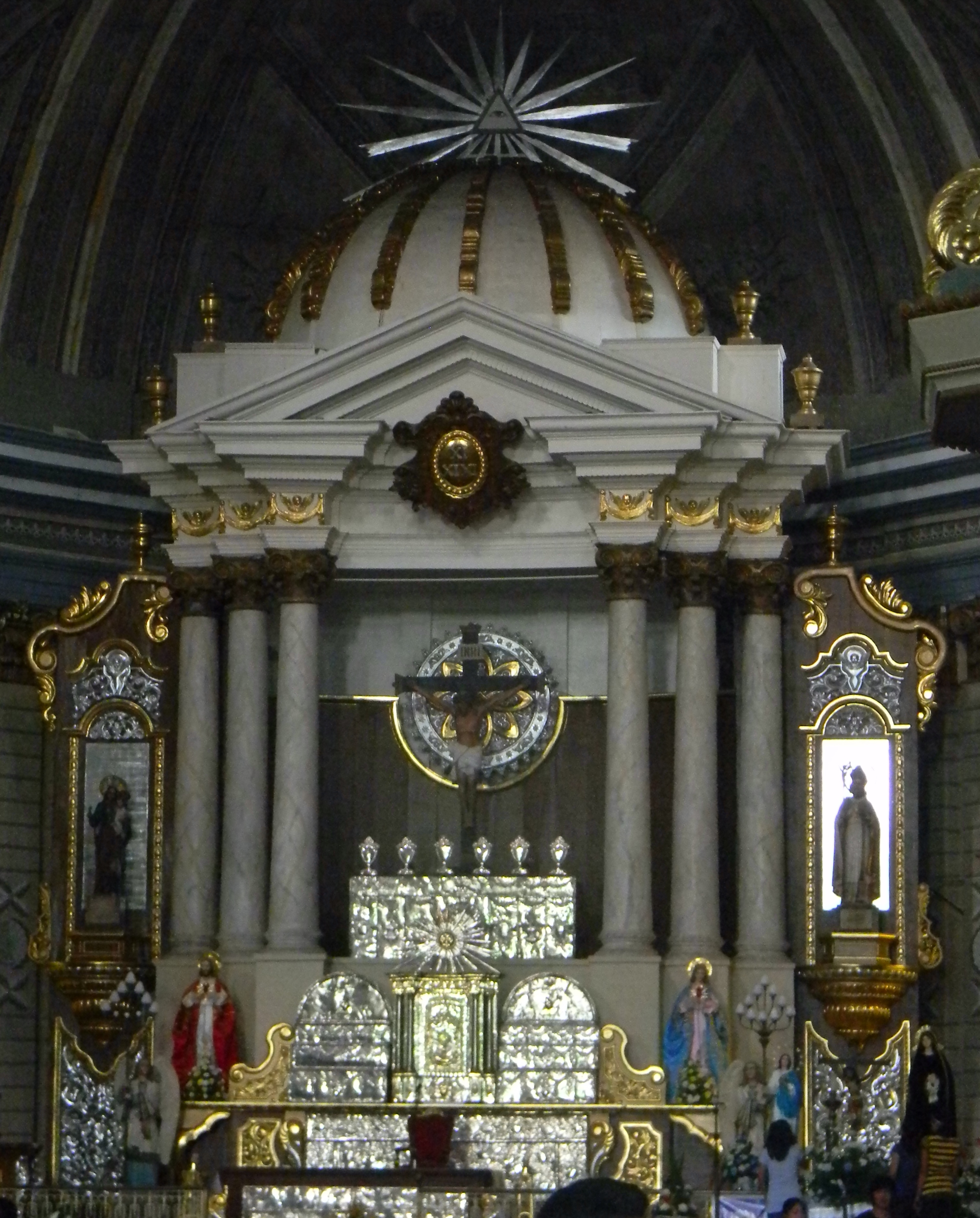
High altar

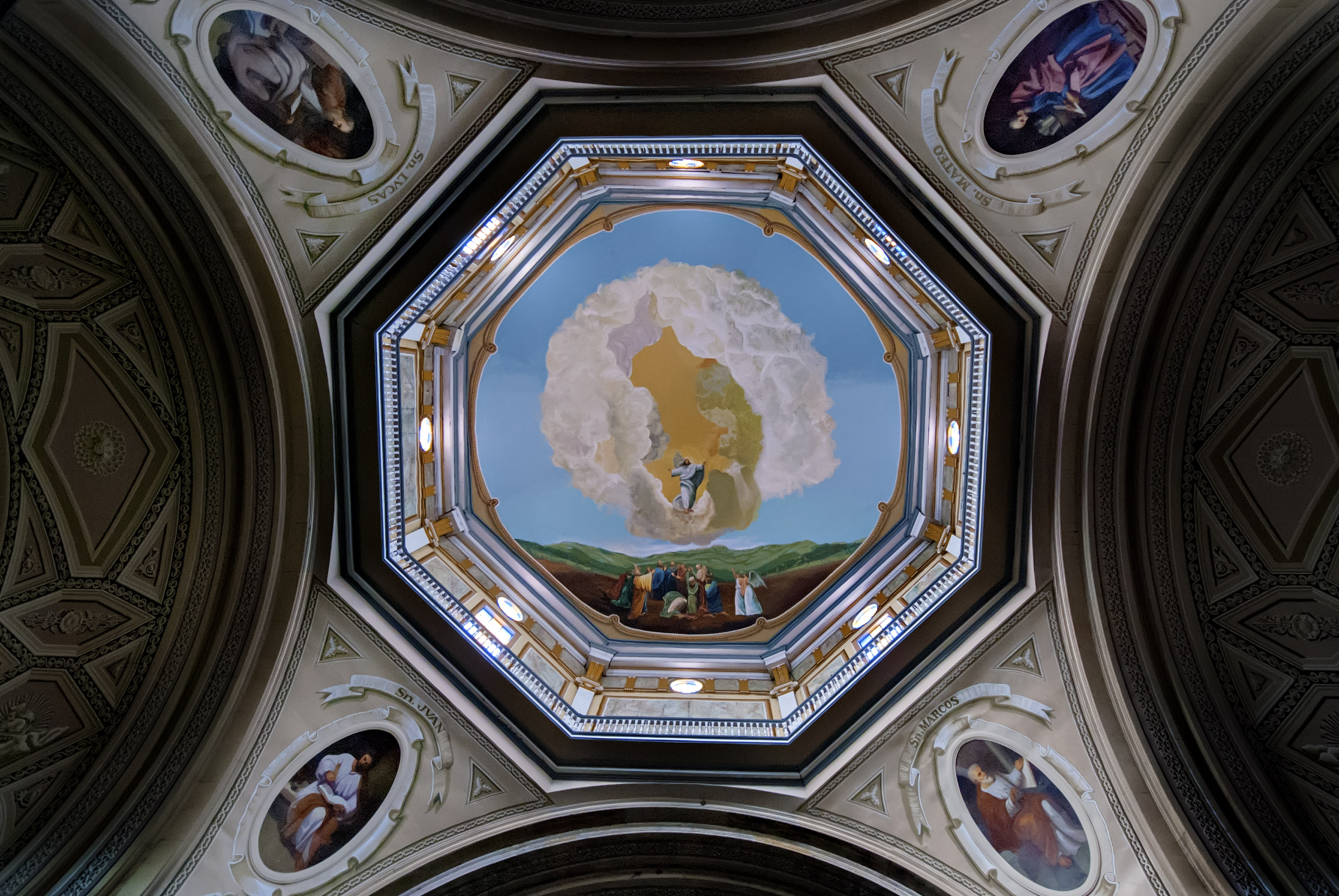
Dome interior depicting the Ascension of Jesus, with paintings of the Four Evangelists in the pendentives (Note: clockwise from top left: St. Luke • St. Matthew • St. Mark • St. John)
