= Taal Lake =

Caldera lake in Batangas, Philippines

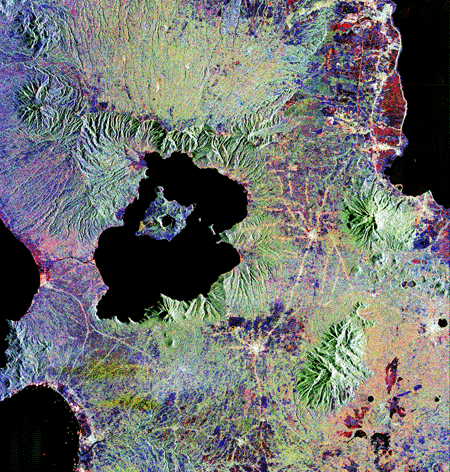
- A false color image of the lake and Volcano Island within it

- Location within the Philippines
- Location: Batangas
- Coordinates: 13°59′05″N 121°00′57″E
- Type: Crater lake
- Primary inflows: Alulod River
- Primary outflows: Pansipit River
- Basin countries: Philippines
- Max. length: 25 km (16 mi)
- Max. width: 18 km (11 mi)
- Surface area: 234.2 km^{2} (90.4 sq mi)
- Average depth: 100 m (330 ft)
- Max. depth: 172 m (564 ft)
- Water volume: 23.42 km^{3} (5.62 cu mi)
- Shore length^{1}: 115 km (71 mi)
- Surface elevation: 5 m (16 ft)
- Islands: Bubuin; Dalig; Lagdauin; Lambauing; Napayon; Volcano Island
- Settlements: Agoncillo; Alitagtag; Balete; Cuenca; Laurel; Lipa; Mataasnakahoy; San Nicolas; Santa Teresita; Talisay; Tanauan
- ^{1} Shore length is not a well-defined measure.

Taal Lake (Tagalog: Lawà ng Taál, IPA: [taʔal], older name: Bombón Lake) is a freshwater caldera lake in the province of Batangas, on the island of Luzon in the Philippines. The lake fills Taal Volcano, a large volcanic caldera formed by very large eruptions between 670 and 6 thousand years ago.

It is the country's third-largest lake, after Laguna de Bay and Lake Lanao. Volcano Island, the location of Taal Volcano's historical eruptions and responsible for the lake's sulfur content, lies near the lake's center.

There is a crater lake on Volcano Island. It was known as Yellow Lake and contains its own small islet, Vulcan Point. Vulcan Point is one of the few third-order islands in the world.

== Protected area and management ==
The Taal Lake basin was first declared as a national park, known as the Taal Volcano National Park, by Proclamation No. 235 on July 22, 1967, covering 62,292 hectares (153,930 acres).

Under Republic Act No. 7586 (the National Integrated Protected Areas System Act of 1992), the area was reestablished as the Taal Volcano Protected Landscape by Proclamation No. 906 on October 16, 1996. The protected area is managed by a Protected Area Management Board (PAMB) and has a Chief Operating Officer called a Protected Area Superintendent. A Management Plan was crafted and approved by the PAMB in 2009 and now serves as the blueprint for the lake’s conservation.

== History ==
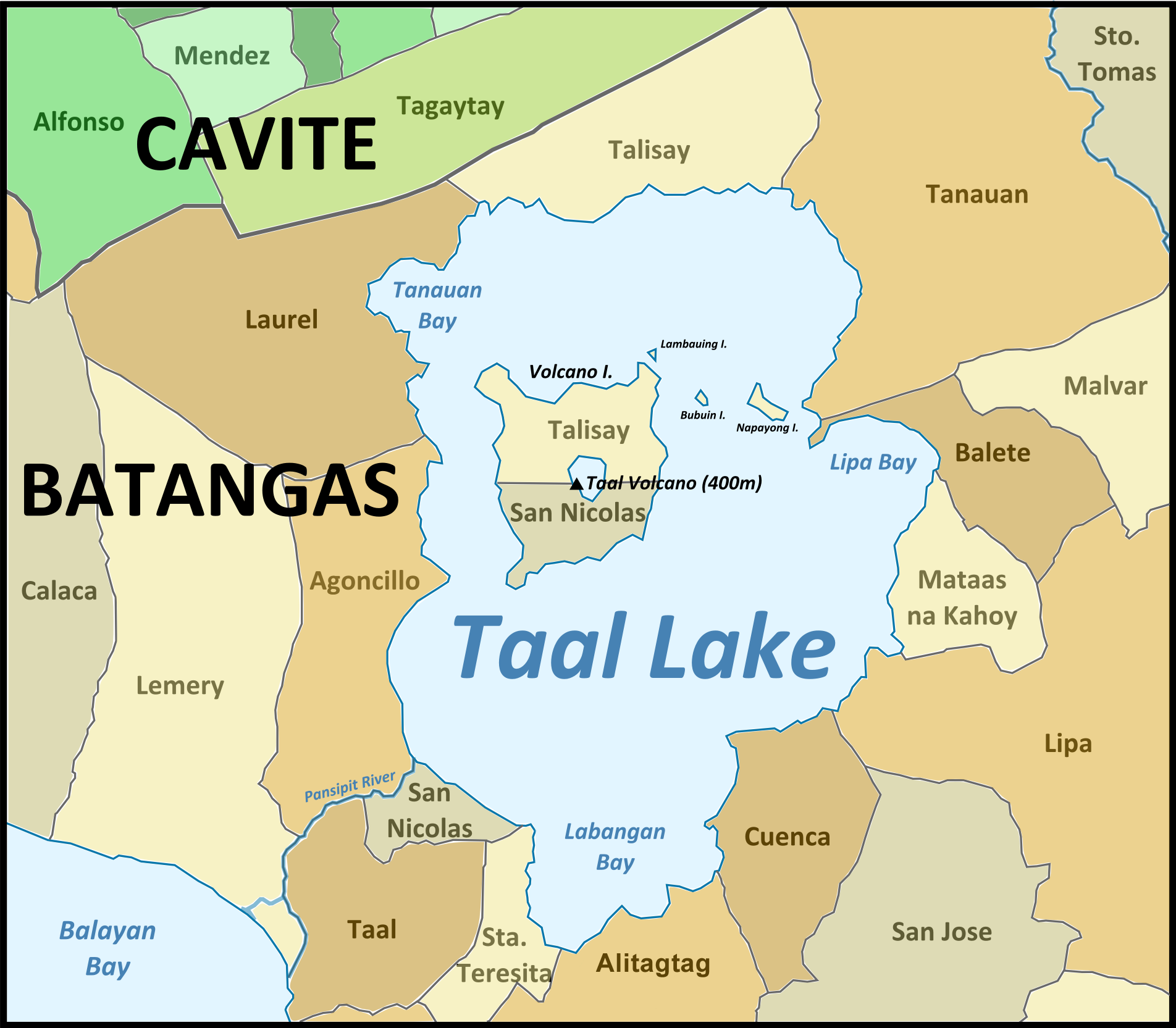
Taal Lake and environs

Taal Lake was once an inlet of nearby Balayan Bay, and was easily navigable from it. A series of major eruptions in the early 18th century battered lakeside towns with earthquakes and volcanic debris. This activity culminated in 1754 with Taal Volcano's largest eruption that blocked Pansipit River with tephra, narrowing the lake's sole outlet to the sea. This caused the lake’s waters to rise, eventually submerging several towns along its shore – the remnants of which are reportedly visible underwater to this day. Since the 1754 eruption, the lake’s surface elevation had risen from sea level to 5 metres (16 ft) above sea level, and its saline waters becoming brackish and eventually freshwater after centuries of precipitation.

The poblaciones (town centres) of Lipa, Taal, Sala, Bauan, and Tanauan were abandoned and reestablished several kilometers away from the lakeshore after volcanic activity had subsided. In the century since, newer settlements along the lakeshore were carved from the larger towns: Talisay (established 1869, from Taal), Cuenca (1877, from San José), Alitagtag (1910, from Bauan), Mataasnakahoy (1932, from Lipa), Agoncillo (1949, from Lemery), San Nicolas (1955, over the ruins of old Taal), Santa Teresita (1961, from Taal, San Luis, and San Nicolas), Laurel (1969, from Talisay) and Balete (1969, from Lipa).

== Ecology ==
As the lake was previously connected to the sea, it is home to many endemic species that have evolved and adapted to the desalination of the lake's waters. The lake has a freshwater-adapted population of trevally, Caranx ignobilis. This fish, also found in Pansipit River, is locally called maliputo. Its most popular endemic species is the overharvested Sardinella tawilis, a freshwater sardine. The two other endemic fish species in Taal Lake are the gobies Gnatholepis volcanus and Rhinogobius flavoventris.

Taal Lake is also home to one of the world's rarest sea snakes, Hydrophis semperi. This particular species is only one of two "true" sea snake (Hydrophiinae) species that are known to live entirely in freshwater (the other is Hydrophis sibauensis from the Sibua River, Borneo, Indonesia). Bull sharks were once part of the lake's once-diverse ecosystem, presumably as the endemic apex predator, but were extirpated by the locals by the 1930s.

=== Introduction of a non-native fish ===
Cichlids were introduced to the lake by locals, either intentionally for aquaculture and release by aquarists or by accident. African and South American species, such as the Jaguar guapote, a large-bodied, large-mouthed, predatory piscivore, was found illegally introduced into the lake. The alien fish could proliferate in all areas of lake because of the abundant aquatic vegetation which they use for spawning and feeding, plenty of wild (often endemic) food, and a climate that resembles its native habitat. Its presence could seriously affect the native fish population.

=== Fish kill ===
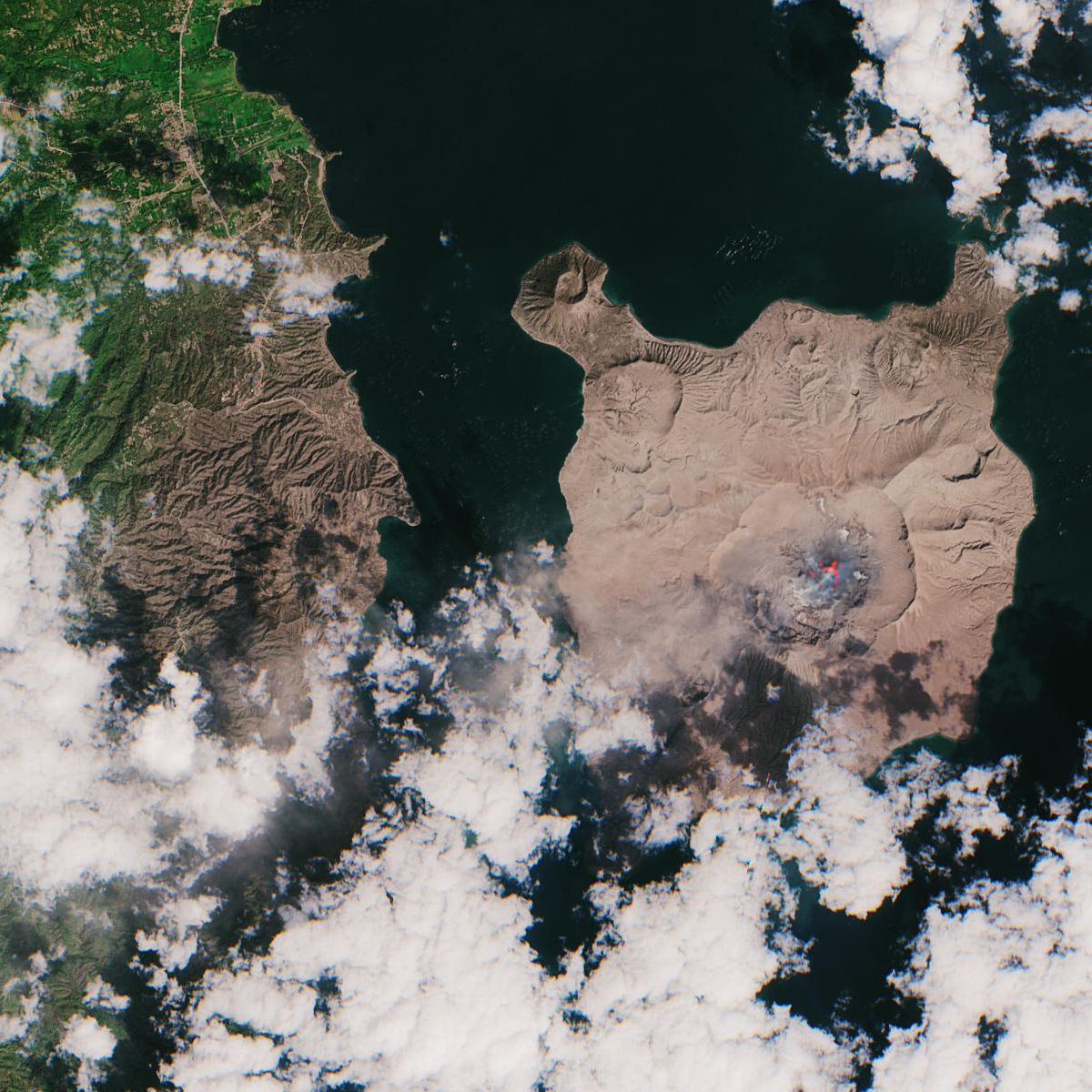
Copernicus Sentinel-2 image of Lake Taal and ash-blanketed Taal Volcano on January 23, 2020, during the 2020–2022 eruptions

On January 5, 2008, the Bureau of Fisheries and Aquatic Resources announced that a fish kill at Taal Lake (January 2 to 4) caused the 50 metric tons or ₱3.25-million ($79,268) loss of cultured tilapia in the villages of Leviste and Balakilong in Laurel and in Barangays Aya and Quiling in Talisay. 6,000 maliputo fishes ($5,609) also died at Quiling. Toxic sulfur and high level of hydrogen sulfide in Ambulong while low dissolved oxygen caused the deaths.

On May 30, 2011, the Bureau of Fisheries and Aquatic Resources announced a fish kill of 750 metric tons. According to the scientists, the onset of the rainy season brought a sudden drop on the water temperature, which lowered the oxygen levels on the lake.

Fish kill was observed in the lakeshores following the 2020–2022 Taal Volcano eruptions; the Bureau of Fisheries and Aquatic Resources, however, ruled out the volcano's restiveness as its cause.

== Tourism ==
Regular tours of the lake are available to tourists. After crossing the lake, visitors travel to the top of Volcano Island on horseback. During their trip up and down the mountain, visitors have views of the lake and its surroundings.

Talisay on the northern shore also is the location of the Taal Lake Yacht Club. TLYC has been the host club for sailing events such as the Philippine Hobie Nationals and the Oz Goose Nationals. Taal Lake also has been favored by windsurfers and kiteboarders.

Tagaytay in Cavite has benefited from Taal Lake and Taal Volcano, which is administered by neighboring province of Batangas. Many tourists have visited Tagaytay for a panoramic view of the lake and volcano.

In mid-2007, controversy ensued when the Korean firm Jung Ang Interventure was given clearance to build a health spa on Volcano Island along the lake's edge. Over the course of the next few weeks, several government officials expressed their disapproval of the construction project. On June 28, 2007, the Department of Environment and Natural Resources (DENR) suspended the Korean firm's environmental clearance certificate, rendering them incapable of pursuing further construction on the island until they secure other necessary permits. Because of the unpopular public reaction to the project, the Korean company's permit was permanently revoked by the DENR in early July 2007.

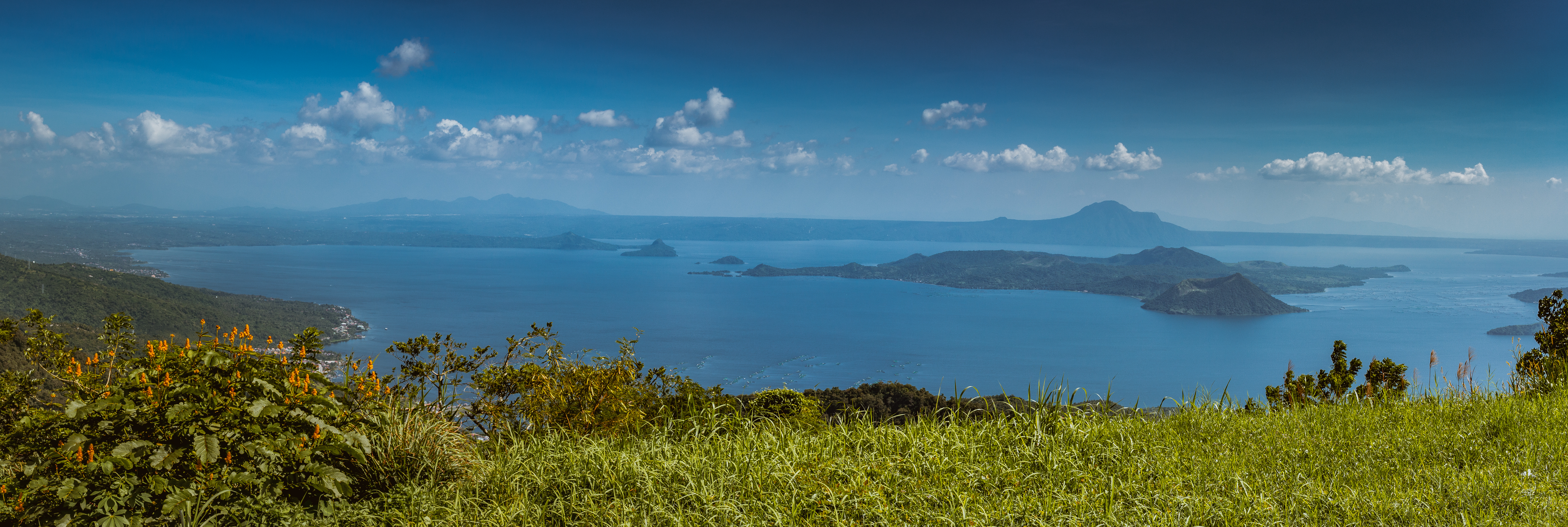
Panorama of Taal Lake and Volcano taken from Tagaytay in 2016

== See also ==
- Laguna de Bay
- Main Crater Lake
