= Pansipit River =

River in Batangas, Philippines

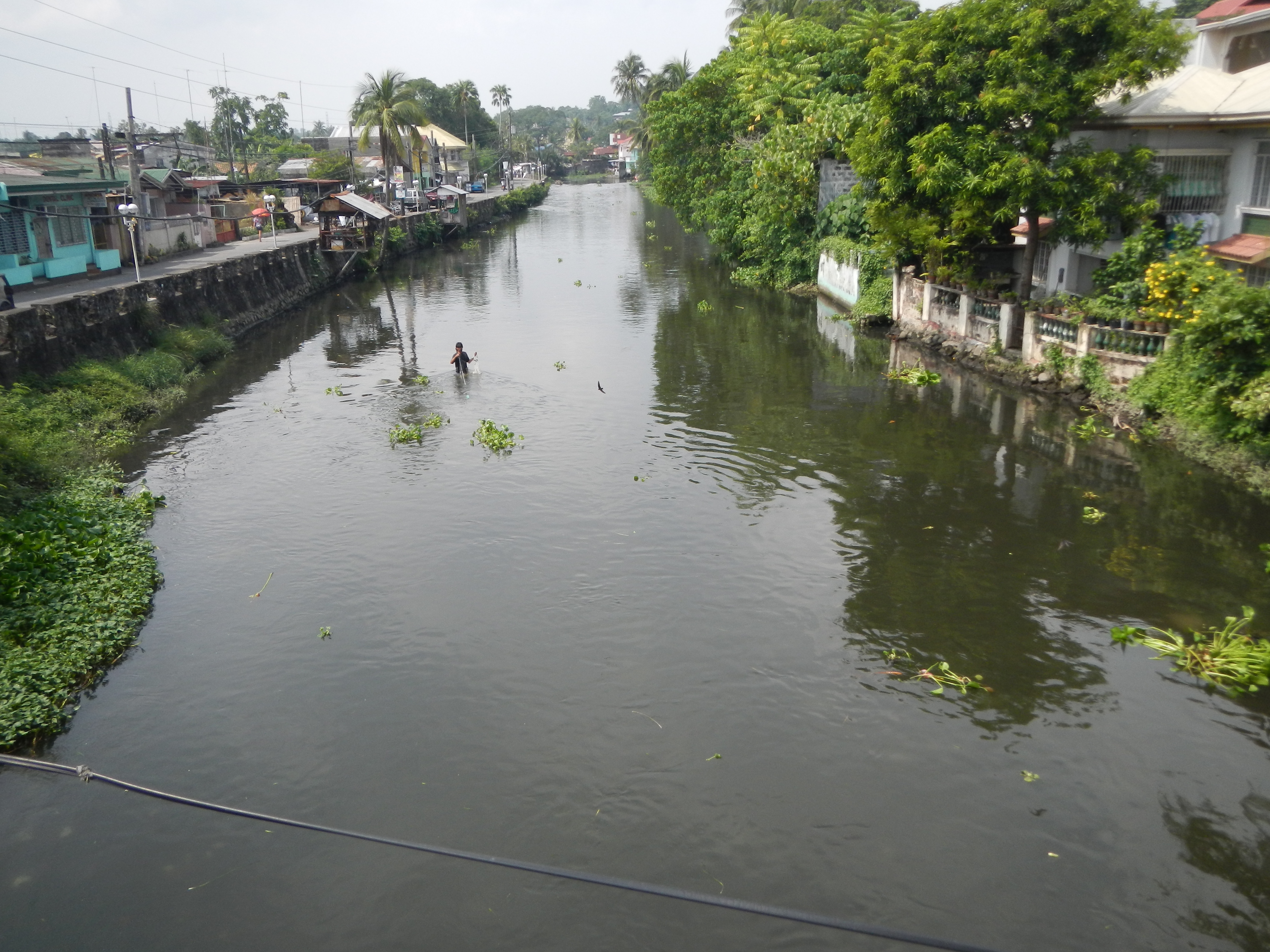
- Pansipit River in Lemery, Batangas

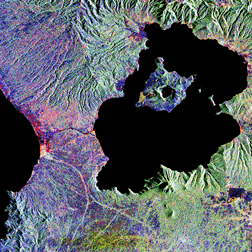
- Satellite image of Taal Lake (right) and Balayan Bay (left) with the Pansipit River linking the two bodies of water

- Pansipit River mouth Pansipit River (Philippines)

Location
- Country: Philippines
- Region: Calabarzon
- Province: Batangas
- City/municipality: Agoncillo; Lemery; San Nicolas; Taal

Physical characteristics
- Source: Taal Lake
  - location: Batangas
  - coordinates: 13°55′51″N 120°56′59″E
  - elevation: 5 m (16 ft)
- Mouth: Balayan Bay
  - location: Batangas
  - coordinates: 13°52′16″N 120°54′50″E
  - elevation: 0 m (0 ft)
- Length: 9 km (5.6 mi)
- Discharge
  - location: Balayan Bay

The Pansipit River is a short river located in the Batangas province of the Philippines. The river is the sole drainage outlet of Taal Lake, which empties to Balayan Bay. The river stretches some 9 kilometers (5.6 mi) passing along the municipalities of Agoncillo, Lemery, San Nicolas, and Taal, serving as a boundary between the communities. It has a very narrow entrance from Taal Lake.

== Etymology ==
The Pansipit River was known as the Taa-lan River. The municipality of Taal and the Taa-lan River were named after the Taa-lan tree, which grows along the river. The tree also grew along the shore of Bombon Lake (now known as Taal Lake).

== History ==
Before the eruptions of Taal Volcano in the 18th century, Pansipit was a navigable channel connecting Taal Lake to Balayan Bay. Sailing ships and Chinese junks freely entered Taal Lake to visit the town of Taal and other population centers along its shores. The water of the lake was then saline. In 1754, after the culmination of worst eruption of Taal Volcano had subsided, the mouth of the river was found blocked by volcanic material, eventually raising the level of the lake. A narrower Pansipit River eventually formed from the layer of ejecta from the volcano and a new course was created. The present source of the river on the lake is perhaps 1/2 kilometre (0.31 mi) north of the old entrance with the new channel joining the old channel about 1 to 2 kilometres (0.62 to 1.24 mi) down the river valley. The change in the elevation of the lake also prevented sea water from flowing into the lake thus turning it to freshwater, its marine life evolved and adapted to freshwater living.

== Ecology ==
As the river is the sole drainage outlet, the Pansipit shares many of the unique biota found in the lake. One specific strain, the lake's freshwater population of the jack Caranx ignobilis, is known to conduct its annual migration runs through the river. Commonly known as the "giant trevally" and locally as maliputo, this population is particularly notable for inhabiting the river's freshwater waters since the species itself is commonly associated with coral reefs. At one time, more than 80 different species of fish were found to inhabit the river's waters, either as a migratory channel or as a permanent residence. This included Taal Lake's now-extinct population of bull sharks (Carcharhinus leucas).

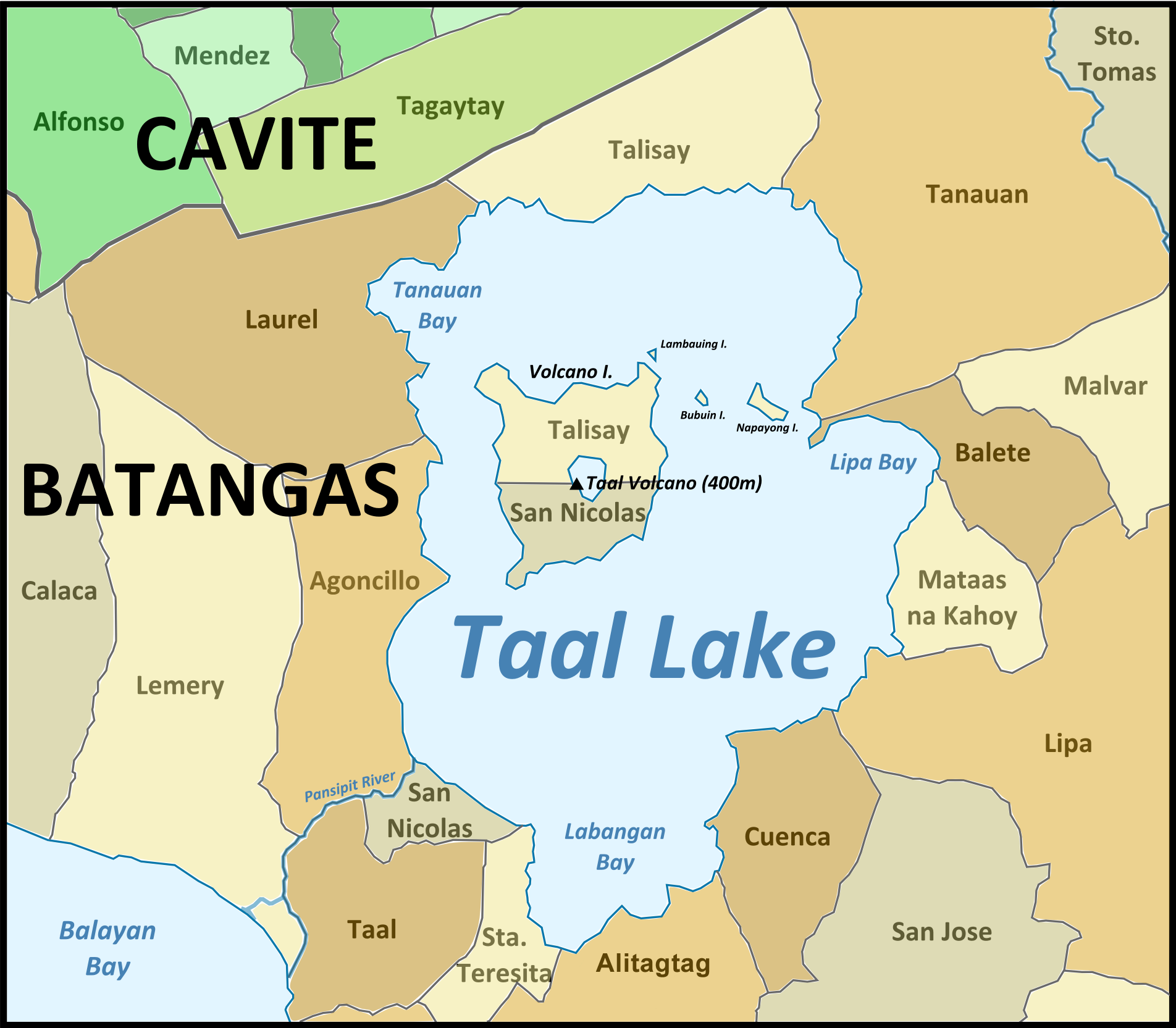
The map of Taal Lake and Pansipit River with the towns separated by the river.

== Protection ==
Being the sole outflow of a commercially important lake, the Pansipit has a rich history of management and regulation of its aquatic resources. In 1941 fishing in the river and its surrounding waters was banned with a 5-year closed season by the then Commonwealth of the Philippines. During the Japanese occupation of the Philippines in World War II, the exclusive rights to the river for aquaculture purposes were leased to Santiago Banaag. At the time, a maximum of one fish corral was authorized by the contract, and the structure was to cover only up to two-thirds of the width of the river, leaving the remaining third for "free navigation and the migration of fishes". After the war, the lease was rescinded in 1949 and fishery rights reverted to the towns of Taal and Lemery.

Since then, the construction of fish cages has long been a problem for the river's natural ecology. The fish cages, often spanning the width of the entire river, physically block the natural migratory paths of fish species that move between the lake and the sea. The presence of the wooden structures also impede and disrupt the river's natural currents, slowing down the flow of water and creating stagnant spots in the river. By 2002, a high of 623 fish cages were recorded by a census group. Over the years, numerous measures have been attempted to curb the growing number of illegal fish cages in the river. In 1996, fish cages and other aquaculture elements in the river (and the adjoining lake) were ordered removed through an official executive order. Some of the reasons cited referred to pollution of the river caused by effluent waste from the fish pens. The structures were also said to physically impede the progress of native fish migrating up and down the river. Protected area status was granted to the river with the enactment of the National Integrated Protected Areas System (NIPAS) Act in 1996. Another attempt to clear the river was pursued in 2002. A record 623 cages were dismantled during that effort. Less than a decade after, in 2007 cages were found to have been reconstructed in significant amounts throughout the length of the river. This culminated in the latest river-clearing effort in mid-2008 by a special task force appointed for the job. A total of 96 illegal fish cages were removed in June 2008, the number of which had already dropped from the previous year's tally of more than 150 cages. As of July 2008, no fish pens remain within the river's waters.

== Bibliography ==
- Mercene, Eliadora C.; Aida R. Alzona (1990). "Survey on migratory fishes in Pansipit river and Taal Lake". The Philippine Journal of Fisheries. 21. Manila: 89+.
