= San Nicolas, Batangas =

Municipality in Batangas, Philippines

San Nicolas
- Municipality
- Municipality of San Nicolas
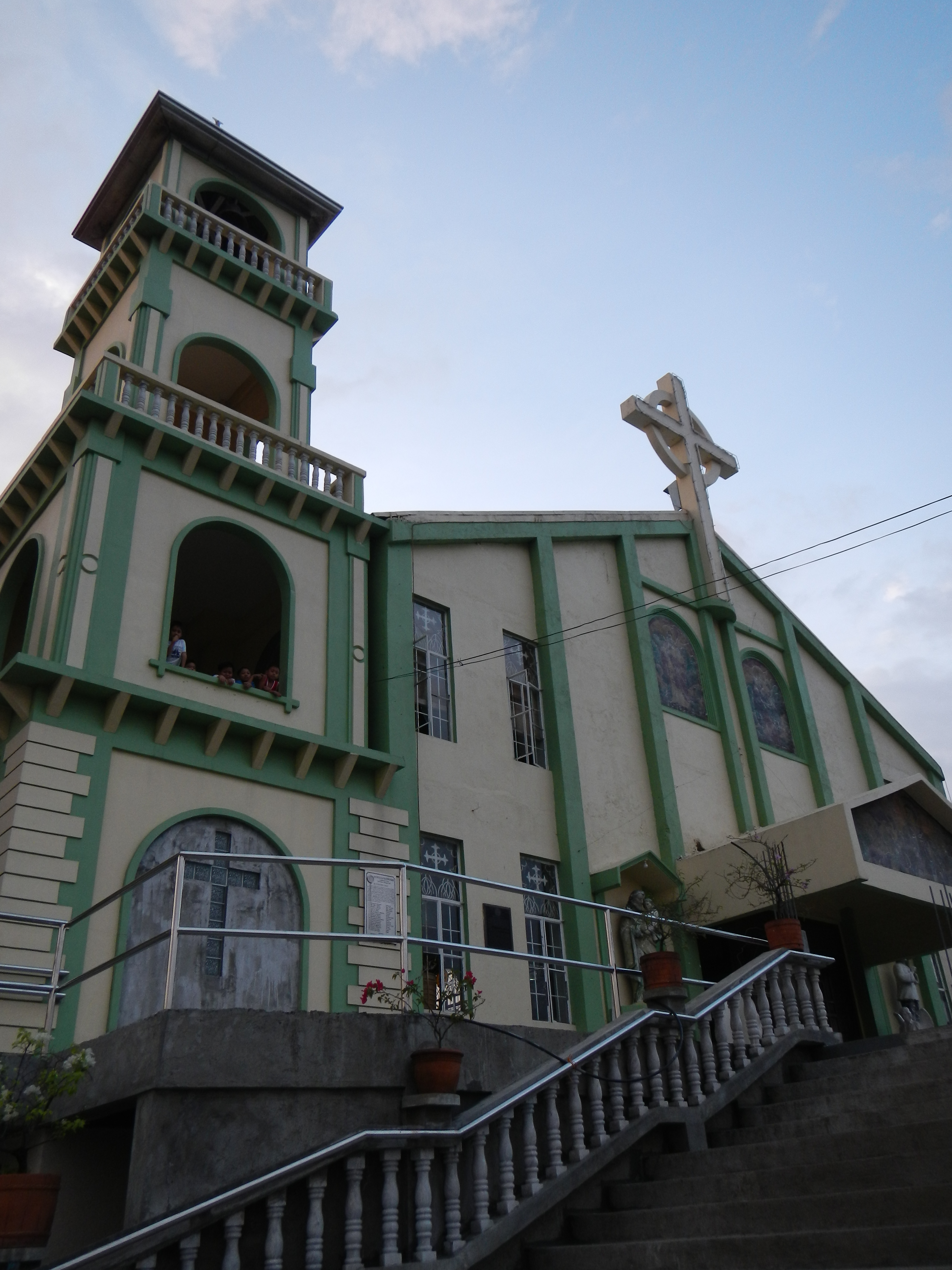
- San Nicolas de Tolentino Parish Church

- Map of Batangas with San Nicolas highlighted
- Interactive map of San Nicolas
- Location within the Philippines
- Coordinates: 13°55′42″N 120°57′04″E
- Country: Philippines
- Region: Calabarzon
- Province: Batangas
- District: 3rd district
- Founded: August 9, 1955
- Named for: St. Nicholas of Tolentino
- Barangays: 18 (see Barangays)

Government
  - Type: Sangguniang Bayan
  - Mayor: Lester D. de Sagun
  - Vice Mayor: Mark J. de Sagun
  - Representative: King George Leandro Antonio V. Collantes
  - Municipal Council: Members: August D. Perez; Marie Kristine Joy M. Obligar; Christopher A. Barrion; Marivic M. Ondo; Ruelito M. De Sagun; Agapito H. Gardiola; Victor G. Sandoval; Gemetrio T. Umandap
  - Electorate: 16,051 voters (2025)

Area
  - Total: 14.37 km^{2} (5.55 sq mi)
- Elevation: 47 m (154 ft)
- Highest elevation: 286 m (938 ft)
- Lowest elevation: 5 m (16 ft)

Population (2024 census)
  - Total: 24,392
  - Density: 1,697/km^{2} (4,396/sq mi)
  - Households: 5,209

Economy
  - Income class: 4th municipal income class
  - Poverty incidence: 7.8% (2023)
  - Revenue: ₱ 134.3 million (2024)
  - Assets: ₱ 363.8 million (2024)
  - Expenditure: ₱ 68.27 million (2024)
  - Liabilities: ₱ 51.26 million (2024)

Service provider
  - Electricity: Batangas 1 Electric Cooperative (BATELEC 1)
- Time zone: UTC+8 (PST)
- ZIP code: 4207
- PSGC: 0401025000
- IDD : area code: +63 (0)43
- Native languages: Tagalog

San Nicolas, officially the Municipality of San Nicolas (Tagalog: Bayan ng San Nicolas), is a municipality in the province of Batangas, Philippines. According to the 2024 census, it has a population of 24,392 people.

== Etymology ==
San Nicolas is derived from Spanish for Saint Nicholas of Tolentino, the town's patron saint.

== History ==
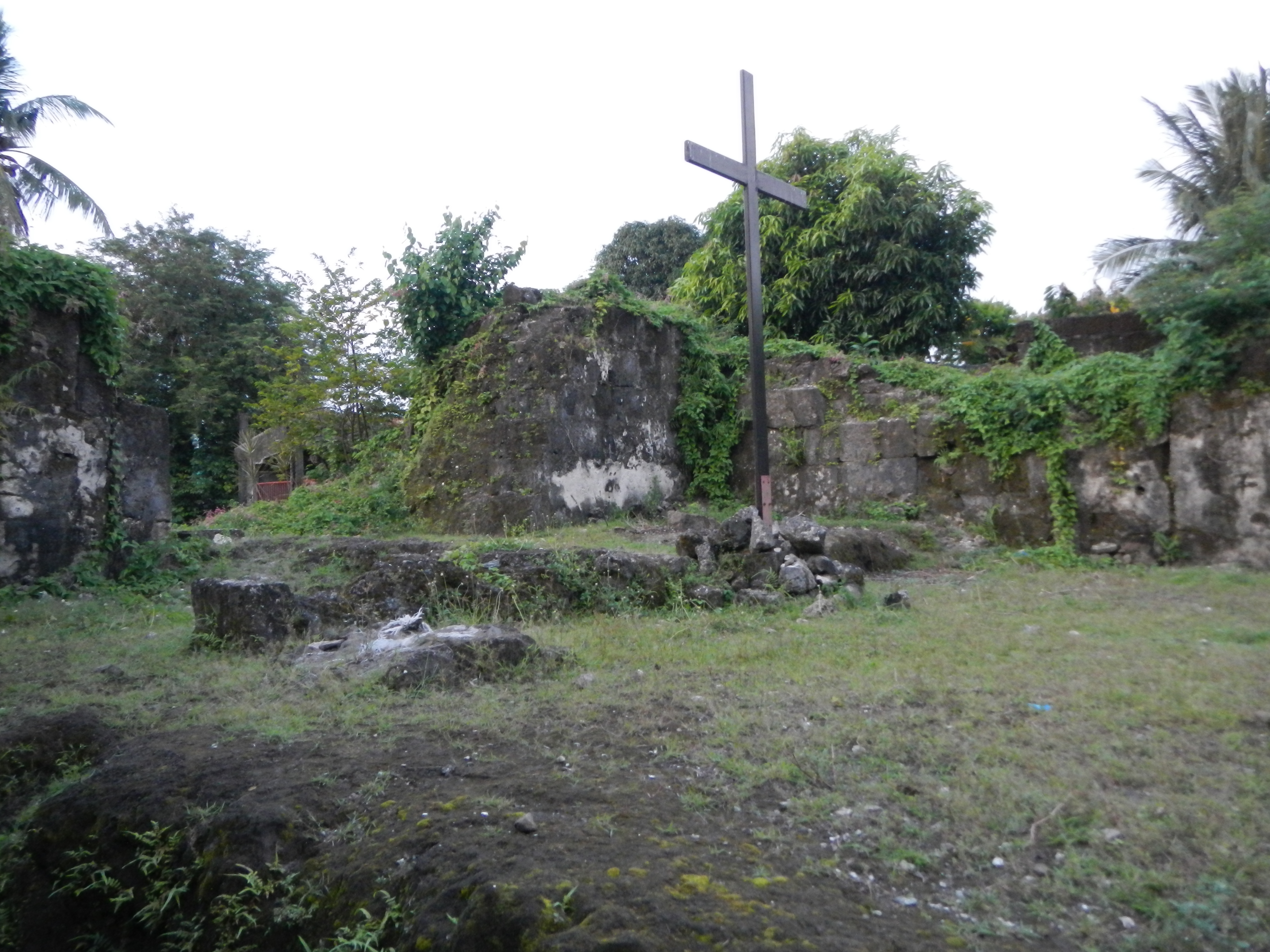
Ruins of the old site of Taal Basilica in Poblacion, San Nicolas

San Nicolas traces its roots to barrio Wawa, which was once part of the municipality of Taal. The barrio also covered areas of what is now Alitagtag, Agoncillo, Lemery, and San Luis, according to old locals. It was first inhabited by Malays from Borneo. It was the site of Taal's second municipal center from its establishment in 1572 to 1754, during the peak of Moro piracy. Taal was designated as the provincial capital of Batangas from 1732 to 1754. The 1754 Taal Volcano eruption, which lasted for months, greatly destroyed the area, making Taal move its municipal center to its present location near Balayan Bay. After which, Wawa was renamed to San Nicolas.

It was on the night of June 25, 1954 that the San Nicolas Ladies Club tendered a party in honor of Miss Marcelina de Sagun for passing the Board of Midwifery, when some old folks in the persons of Atty. Exequiel D. Caringal, Mr. Jose Caringal, Mr. Herminigildo de Sagun, Mr. Alfredo Umali, Mr. Ireneo Matienzo, Mr. Teodoro S. Mayuga and Mr. Maximo Atienza conceived the idea of converting barrio San Nicolas into a new municipality. Neighboring barangay residents were consulted and a unanimous decision was established favoring the proposal. Not only was a committee formed, but also a delegation to the President, headed by Batangas Governor Feliciano Leviste and Senator Jose P. Laurel. However, the Municipal Mayor of Taal, Hon. Ignacio Ilagan, with his avid followers, opposed the move. The committee requested Representative Apolinario R. Apacible (Batangas–1st) to file a bill in Congress. The Representative immediately filed House Bill No. 3407, co-sponsored by Representative Lamberto Macias (Negros Oriental–2nd), which ultimately led to the creation of the Municipality of San Nicolas.

In 1955, with the enactment of Republic Act No. 1229, the municipality, consisting of the Taal barrios of San Nicolas, Abelo, Alas-as, Balete, Bancoro, Bangin, Calangay, Calawit, Calumala, Hipit, Maabud, Munlawin, Pansipit, Pulang-Bato, Saimsim, Sinturisan, Talang, and Tambo, was created. The effect entered into force on June 1, 1955. In 1957, the following sitios were converted into independent barrios: Burol from Tambo, Tagudtod from Munlawin, Kalawit and Pulang-Bato from Alas-as, and Baluk-Baluk from Hipit. In 1961, the barrios of Calumala, Tambo, Saimsim and Bucal were separated from San Nicolas to form parts of the new municipality of Santa Teresita.

The first appointed Mayor (August 09, 1955) and first elected Mayor (November 09, 1959) of San Nicolas, Batangas is Atty. Exequiel D. Caringal. In April 1963, Nacionalista Mayor Teodoro Mayuga joined the Liberal Party, aligning with the Macapagal administration.

== Geography ==
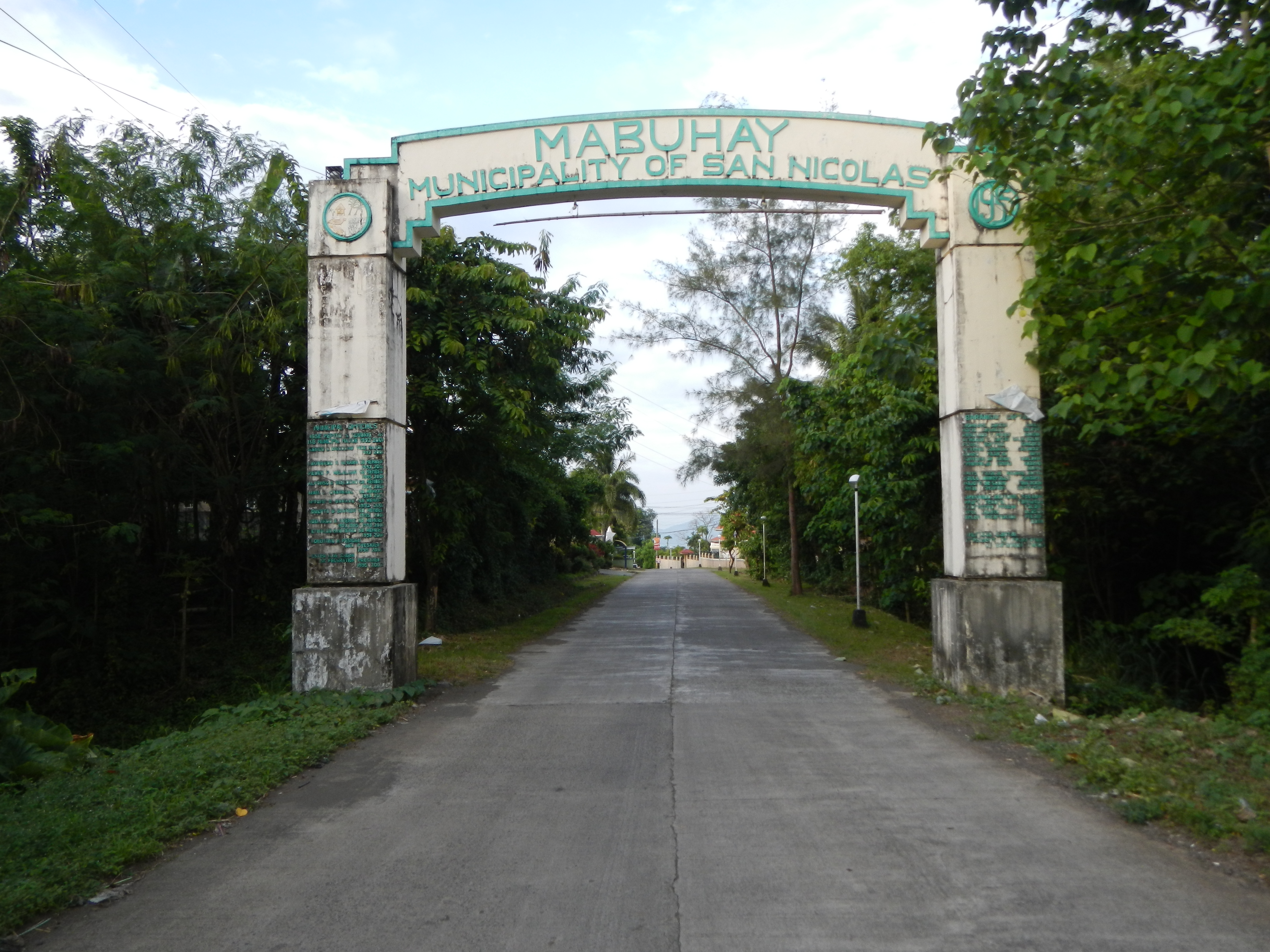
San Nicolas welcome arch at its boundary with Taal

According to the Philippine Statistics Authority, the municipality has a land area of 14.37 square kilometers (5.55 sq mi) constituting 0.46% of the 3,119.75-square-kilometer (1,204.54 sq mi) total area of Batangas.

The municipality also occupies the southern half of Taal Volcano, shared by the municipality of Talisay in the northern half.

=== Barangays ===
San Nicolas is politically subdivided into 18 barangays, as shown in the matrix below. Each barangay consists of puroks and some have sitios.

PSGC	Barangay	Population			±% p.a.	
		2024		2010		
041025001	Abelo	4.0%	978	869	▴	0.82%
041025002	Balete	7.5%	1,822	1,759	▴	0.24%
041025003	Baluk‑baluk	3.8%	916	804	▴	0.91%
041025004	Bancoro	10.9%	2,648	2,549	▴	0.26%
041025005	Bangin	8.2%	2,008	1,910	▴	0.35%
041025006	Calangay	7.5%	1,834	1,651	▴	0.73%
041025007	Hipit	2.6%	623	571	▴	0.61%
041025009	Maabud North	4.1%	991	982	▴	0.06%
041025010	Maabud South	2.9%	696	682	▴	0.14%
041025011	Munlawin	4.0%	976	774	▴	1.62%
041025012	Pansipit	1.8%	446	422	▴	0.38%
041025013	Poblacion	10.2%	2,481	2,416	▴	0.18%
041025014	Santo Niño	3.8%	919	826	▴	0.74%
041025015	Sinturisan	8.0%	1,947	1,710	▴	0.91%
041025016	Tagudtod	2.6%	631	623	▴	0.09%
041025017	Talang	3.0%	721	667	▴	0.54%
041025018	Alas‑as	5.4%	1,327	901	▴	2.72%
041025019	Pulang‑Bato	2.7%	659	483	▴	2.18%
	Total		24,392	20,599	▴	1.18%

=== Climate ===
Climate data for San Nicolas, Batangas
Month	Jan	Feb	Mar	Apr	May	Jun	Jul	Aug	Sep	Oct	Nov	Dec	Year
Mean daily maximum °C (°F)	29 (84)	30 (86)	31 (88)	33 (91)	32 (90)	30 (86)	29 (84)	29 (84)	29 (84)	29 (84)	29 (84)	29 (84)	30 (86)
Mean daily minimum °C (°F)	20 (68)	20 (68)	21 (70)	22 (72)	24 (75)	24 (75)	24 (75)	24 (75)	24 (75)	23 (73)	22 (72)	21 (70)	22 (72)
Average precipitation mm (inches)	11 (0.4)	13 (0.5)	14 (0.6)	32 (1.3)	101 (4.0)	142 (5.6)	208 (8.2)	187 (7.4)	175 (6.9)	131 (5.2)	68 (2.7)	39 (1.5)	1,121 (44.3)
Average rainy days	5.2	5.0	7.4	11.5	19.8	23.5	27.0	25.9	25.2	23.2	15.5	8.3	197.5
Source: Meteoblue

== Demographics ==
Population census of San Nicolas
Year	Pop.	±% p.a.
1960	9,575	—
1970	8,742	−0.90%
1975	8,877	+0.31%
1980	10,511	+3.44%
1990	13,174	+2.28%
1995	14,509	+1.83%
2000	16,278	+2.50%
2007	19,046	+2.19%
2010	20,599	+2.89%
2015	22,623	+1.80%
2020	23,908	+1.17%
2024	24,392	+0.48%
Source: Philippine Statistics Authority

In the 2024 census, San Nicolas had a population of 24,392 people. The population density was 1,700 inhabitants per square kilometre (4,400/sq mi).

== Economy ==
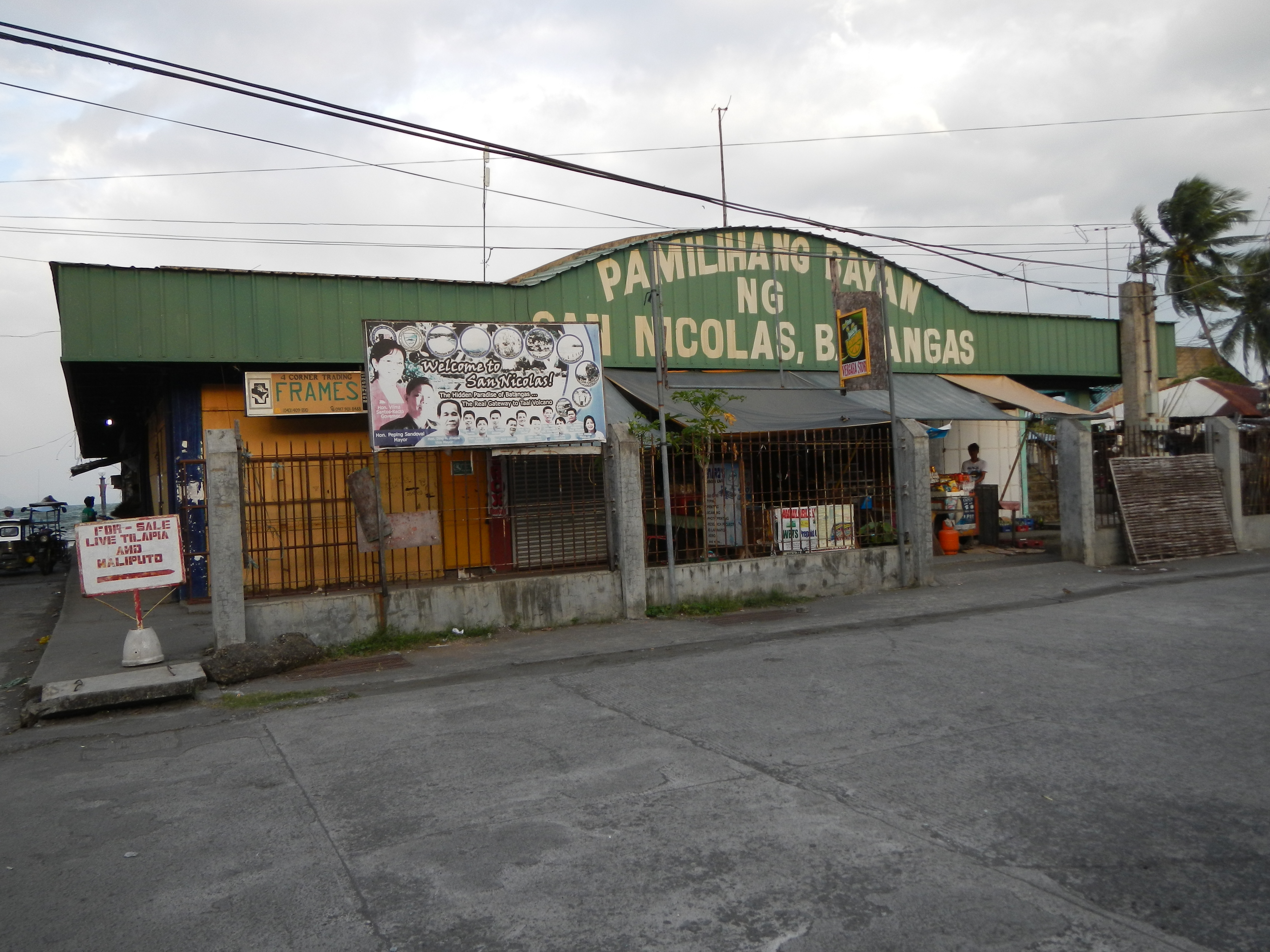
San Nicolas Public Market

Poverty incidence of San Nicolas (%)

Source: Philippine Statistics Authority

== Government ==
Lester De Sagun has been the mayor of San Nicolas since 2019.

== Education ==
The San Nicolas Schools District Office governs all educational institutions within the municipality. It oversees the management and operations of all private and public, from primary to secondary schools.

=== Primary and elementary schools ===
- Abelo Elementary School
- Balete Elementary School
- Bancoro Elementary School
- Bangin Elementary School
- Calangay Elementary School
- Hipit Elementary School
- Maabud Elementary School
- Munlawin Elementary School
- San Nicolas Academy
- San Nicolas Central School
- Sinturisan Elementary School
- St. Nicholas de Tolentino Preparatory School

=== Secondary schools ===
- Maabud National High School
- San Nicolas Integrated High School

== Sister city ==
- Tagaytay, Cavite, Philippines
