= Agoncillo, Batangas =

Municipality in Batangas, Philippines

Agoncillo
- Municipality
- Municipality of Agoncillo
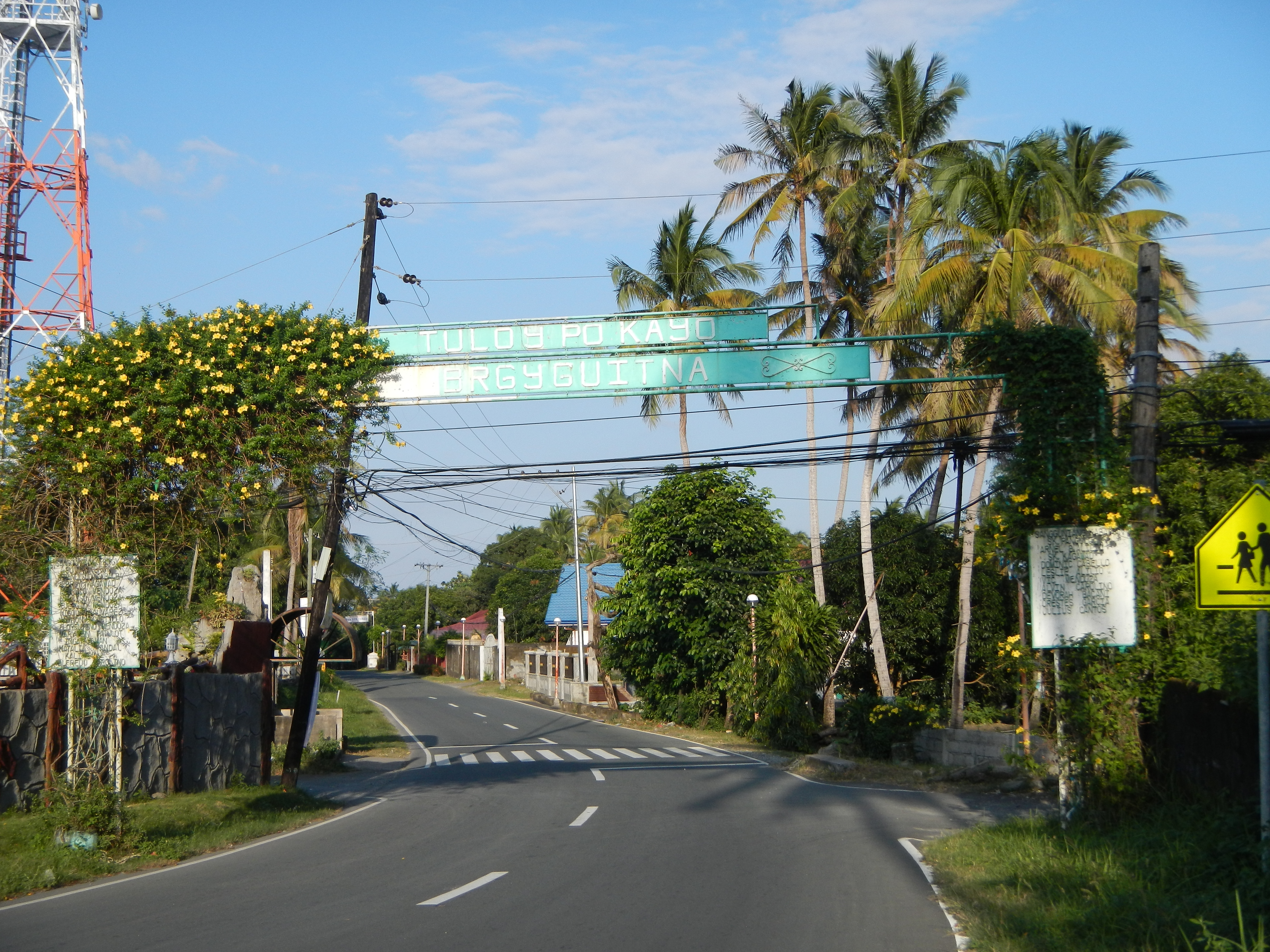
- Barangay Guitna Welcome Arch

- Seal

- Map of Batangas with Agoncillo highlighted
- Interactive map of Agoncillo
- Location within the Philippines
- Coordinates: 13°56′00″N 120°55′43″E
- Country: Philippines
- Region: Calabarzon
- Province: Batangas
- District: 3rd district
- Founded: April 7, 1949
- Named for: Felipe Agoncillo
- Barangays: 21 (see Barangays)

Government
  - Type: Sangguniang Bayan
  - Mayor: Cinderella V. Reyes
  - Vice Mayor: Remjelljan A. Humarang
  - Representative: King George Leandro Antonio V. Collantes
  - Municipal Council: Members: Sarah Pauline S. Mendoza; Virgilio M. Cacao; Jerwyn G. Landicho; Wilbert M. Catena; Jappoy Hilario; Clark Edward S. Caringal; Leonarda A. Enriquez; Joel G. Landicho
  - Electorate: 27,383 voters (2025)

Area
  - Total: 49.96 km^{2} (19.29 sq mi)
- Elevation: 110 m (360 ft)
- Highest elevation: 613 m (2,011 ft)
- Lowest elevation: 0 m (0 ft)

Population (2024 census)
  - Total: 40,662
  - Density: 813.9/km^{2} (2,108/sq mi)
  - Households: 8,580

Economy
  - Income class: 2nd municipal income class
  - Poverty incidence: 9.14% (2023)
  - Revenue: ₱ 269.6 million (2024)
  - Assets: ₱ 557.2 million (2024)
  - Expenditure: ₱ 119.4 million (2024)
  - Liabilities: ₱ 81.08 million (2024)

Service provider
  - Electricity: Batangas 1 Electric Cooperative (BATELEC 1)
- Time zone: UTC+8 (PST)
- ZIP code: 4211
- PSGC: 0401001000
- IDD : area code: +63 (0)43
- Native languages: Tagalog

Agoncillo, officially the Municipality of Agoncillo (Tagalog: Bayan ng Agoncillo), is a municipality in the province of Batangas, Philippines. According to the 2024 census, it has a population of 40,662 people.

== Etymology ==
The town was named in honor of Felipe Agoncillo, a native of Taal.

== History ==
Agoncillo was originally a part of Lemery. In 1945, an executive committee was formed by the first appointed Mayor Jacinto Mendoza Sr. to prepare a resolution, requesting the Secretary of the Interior, Malacañang Palace, through the provincial board to detach and separate 11 barrios and be created a municipality.

Through Executive Order 140 issued by President Elpidio Quirino, the Municipality of Pansipit was created. But the Municipal Council of Lemery passed a resolution requesting for the revocation and suspension of the said creation. Thus, another executive order was endorsed for the conduct of a plebiscite to ascertain the true sentiments of the residents regarding the issue of separation.

Finally, on April 17, 1949, Executive Order No. 212 was issued by President Quirino, lifting the suspension and thereby, authorizing the immediate organization of the Municipality under the name of Agoncillo.

== Geography ==
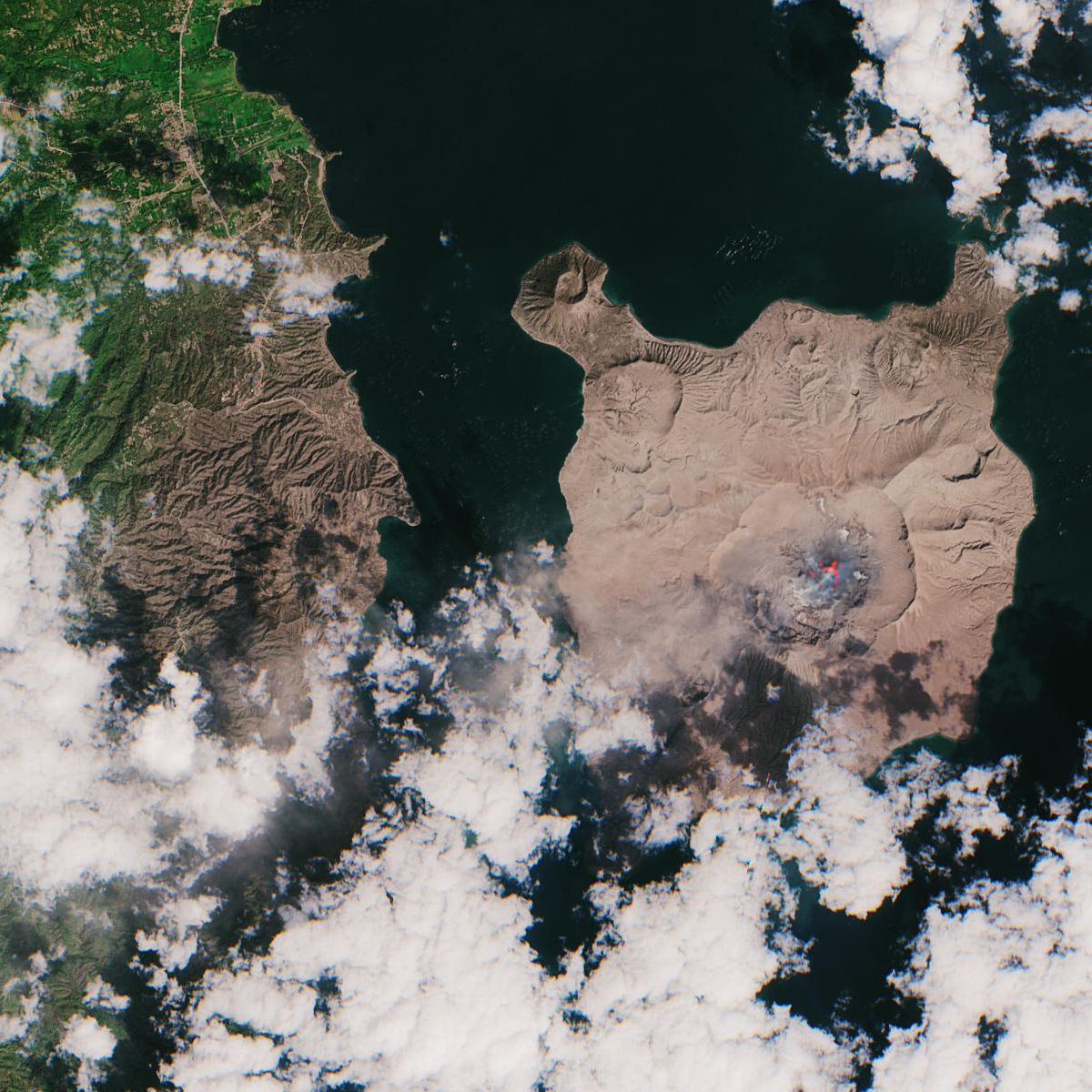
Copernicus Sentinel-2 image of Taal Volcano in January 2020 with the ash-blanketed town of Agoncillo.

Agoncillo is located 118 kilometres (73 mi) south of Manila, a two-hour drive via the scenic route of Tagaytay Ridge and Diokno Highway. It is 32 kilometres (20 mi) away from Batangas City, the provincial capital. It is bounded in the east by approximately 10 kilometres (6.2 mi) lakeshore of Taal Lake, south by San Nicolas and Taal, north by Laurel, and is separated by the Pansipit River on the west by Lemery.

According to the Philippine Statistics Authority, the municipality has a land area of 49.96 square kilometers (19.29 sq mi) constituting 1.60% of the 3,119.75-square-kilometer- (1,204.54 sq mi) total area of Batangas.

=== Barangays ===
Agoncillo is politically subdivided into 21 barangays, as shown in the matrix below. Each barangay consists of puroks and some have sitios.

| PSGC | Barangay | Population | | | ±% p.a. | |
| | | 2024 | | 2010 | | |
|---|---|---|---|---|---|---|
| 041001001 | Adia | 2.2% | 897 | 847 | ▴ | 0.40% |
| 041001002 | Bagong Sikat | 2.4% | 963 | 981 | ▾ | −0.13% |
| 041001004 | Balangon | 3.9% | 1,605 | 1,417 | ▴ | 0.87% |
| 041001006 | Bangin | 4.5% | 1,822 | 1,790 | ▴ | 0.12% |
| 041001023 | Banyaga | 7.5% | 3,051 | 2,791 | ▴ | 0.62% |
| 041001007 | Barigon | 4.0% | 1,629 | 1,477 | ▴ | 0.68% |
| 041001005 | Bilibinwang | 6.6% | 2,695 | 2,464 | ▴ | 0.63% |
| 041001008 | Coral na Munti | 9.4% | 3,803 | 3,465 | ▴ | 0.65% |
| 041001009 | Guitna | 1.4% | 583 | 503 | ▴ | 1.03% |
| 041001010 | Mabini | 2.9% | 1,185 | 1,052 | ▴ | 0.83% |
| 041001012 | Pamiga | 3.9% | 1,599 | 1,504 | ▴ | 0.43% |
| 041001013 | Panhulan | 2.4% | 996 | 1,054 | ▾ | −0.39% |
| 041001014 | Pansipit | 4.0% | 1,632 | 1,778 | ▾ | −0.59% |
| 041001015 | Poblacion | 4.6% | 1,873 | 1,793 | ▴ | 0.30% |
| 041001016 | Pook | 6.6% | 2,697 | 2,500 | ▴ | 0.53% |
| 041001017 | San Jacinto | 1.9% | 753 | 657 | ▴ | 0.95% |
| 041001018 | San Teodoro | 1.4% | 575 | 509 | ▴ | 0.85% |
| 041001019 | Santa Cruz | 2.8% | 1,153 | 1,066 | ▴ | 0.55% |
| 041001020 | Santo Tomas | 1.8% | 728 | 788 | ▾ | −0.55% |
| 041001021 | Subic Ibaba | 9.8% | 3,987 | 4,029 | ▾ | −0.07% |
| 041001022 | Subic Ilaya | 9.4% | 3,833 | 3,329 | ▴ | 0.99% |
| | Total | | 40,662 | 35,794 | ▴ | 0.89% |

=== Climate ===
Climate data for Agoncillo, Batangas
| Month | Jan | Feb | Mar | Apr | May | Jun | Jul | Aug | Sep | Oct | Nov | Dec | Year |
|---|---|---|---|---|---|---|---|---|---|---|---|---|---|
| Mean daily maximum °C (°F) | 28 (82) | 30 (86) | 31 (88) | 33 (91) | 31 (88) | 30 (86) | 29 (84) | 28 (82) | 28 (82) | 29 (84) | 28 (82) | 28 (82) | 29 (85) |
| Mean daily minimum °C (°F) | 20 (68) | 19 (66) | 20 (68) | 22 (72) | 24 (75) | 24 (75) | 24 (75) | 24 (75) | 24 (75) | 23 (73) | 21 (70) | 20 (68) | 22 (72) |
| Average precipitation mm (inches) | 11 (0.4) | 13 (0.5) | 14 (0.6) | 32 (1.3) | 101 (4.0) | 142 (5.6) | 208 (8.2) | 187 (7.4) | 175 (6.9) | 131 (5.2) | 68 (2.7) | 39 (1.5) | 1,121 (44.3) |
| Average rainy days | 5.2 | 5.0 | 7.4 | 11.5 | 19.8 | 23.5 | 27.0 | 25.9 | 25.2 | 23.2 | 15.5 | 8.3 | 197.5 |
Source: Meteoblue (Use with caution: this is modeled/calculated data, not measured locally.)

== Demographics ==
Population census of Agoncillo
| Year | Pop. | ±% p.a. |
|---|---|---|
| 1960 | 9,719 | — |
| 1970 | 12,169 | +2.27% |
| 1975 | 14,076 | +2.96% |
| 1980 | 16,143 | +2.78% |
| 1990 | 20,227 | +2.28% |
| 1995 | 23,358 | +2.73% |
| 2000 | 26,584 | +2.81% |
| 2007 | 33,990 | +3.45% |
| 2010 | 35,794 | +1.90% |
| 2015 | 38,059 | +1.18% |
| 2020 | 39,101 | +0.57% |
| 2024 | 40,662 | +0.94% |
Source: Philippine Statistics Authority

In the 2024 census, Agoncillo had a population of 40,662 people. The population density was 810 inhabitants per square kilometre (2,100/sq mi).

== Economy ==
Poverty incidence of Agoncillo

Source: Philippine Statistics Authority

== Government ==
=== Local government ===
The current set of local government officials were elected in 2022 and their term will expire in 2025. The municipal mayor is Atty. Cinderella Reyes, while the vice mayor is Daniel Reyes, the mayor's husband and predecessor. The municipal council is composed of Sarah Mendoza, Joel Landicho, Jerwyn Landicho, Kidlat Caringal, Embet Catena, Joel Paras De Chavez, Viong Cacao, and Gido Lacap.

== Education ==
The Agoncillo Schools District Office governs all educational institutions within the municipality. It oversees the management and operations of all private and public, from primary to secondary schools.

=== Primary and elementary schools ===
- Agoncillo Central School
- Balangon Elementary School
- Banyaga Elementary School
- Barigon Elementary School
- Bernardo Ondo Memorial Elementary School
- Bilibinwang Elementary School
- Christian Knights Academy
- Coral na Munti Elementary School
- Mahabang Gulod Elementary School
- Medalya Milagrosa Catholic School
- Our Lady of Peace Academy
- Pamiga Elementary School
- Panhulan Elementary School
- Pansipit Elementary School
- Pedagogia School
- Pook Elementary School
- Saint Mary's Educational Institute
- Subic Elementary School

=== Secondary schools ===
- Agoncillo National High School
- Agoncillo Senior High School
- Banyaga National High School
- Coral na Munti National High School

=== Higher educational institutions ===
- Agoncillo Colleges

== Notable personalities ==
- Charlie Dizon - actress and singer
- Micca Rosal- Ms.Aura Philippines 2022 -Title Holder

== Gallery ==
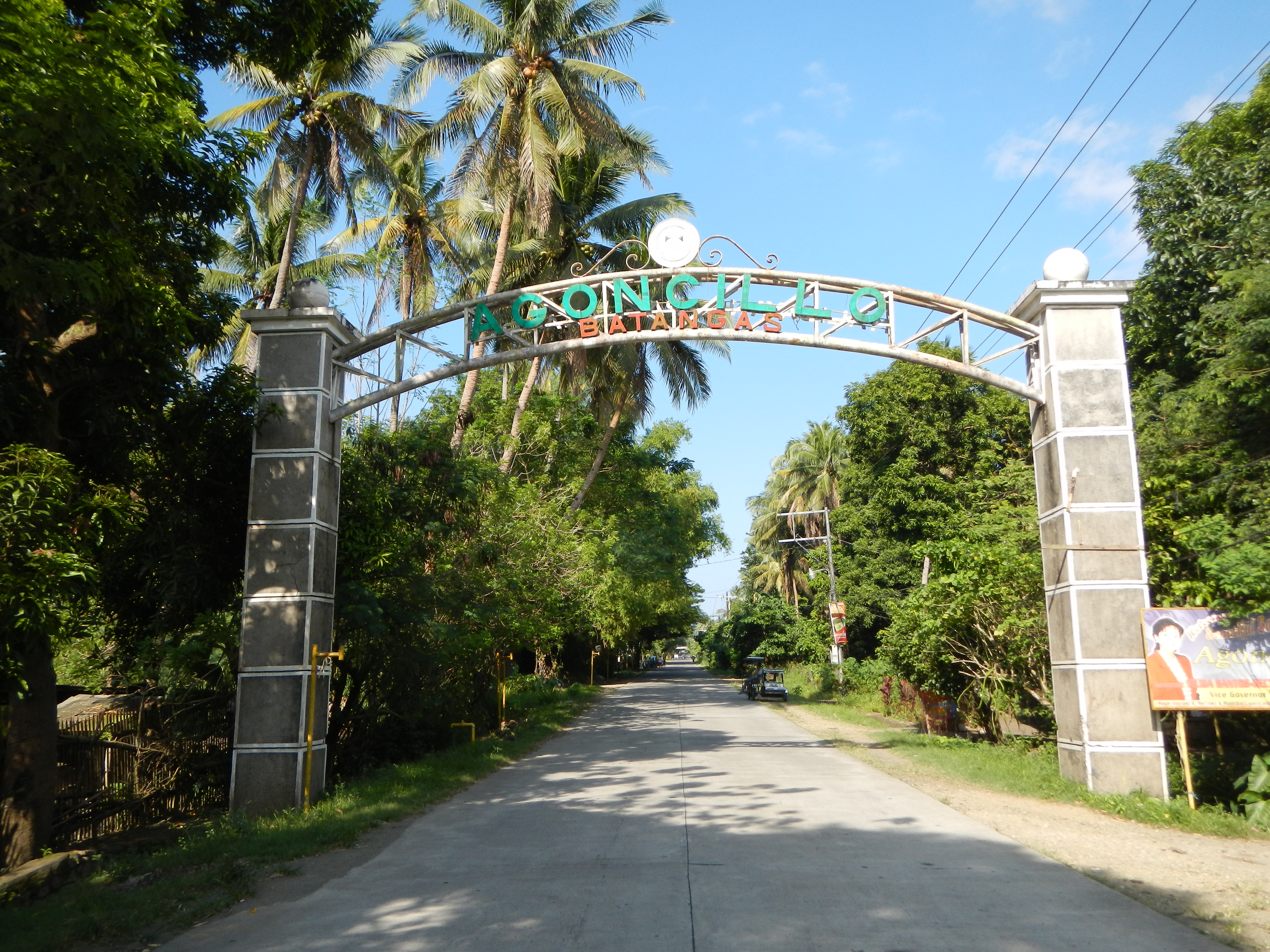
Welcome arch

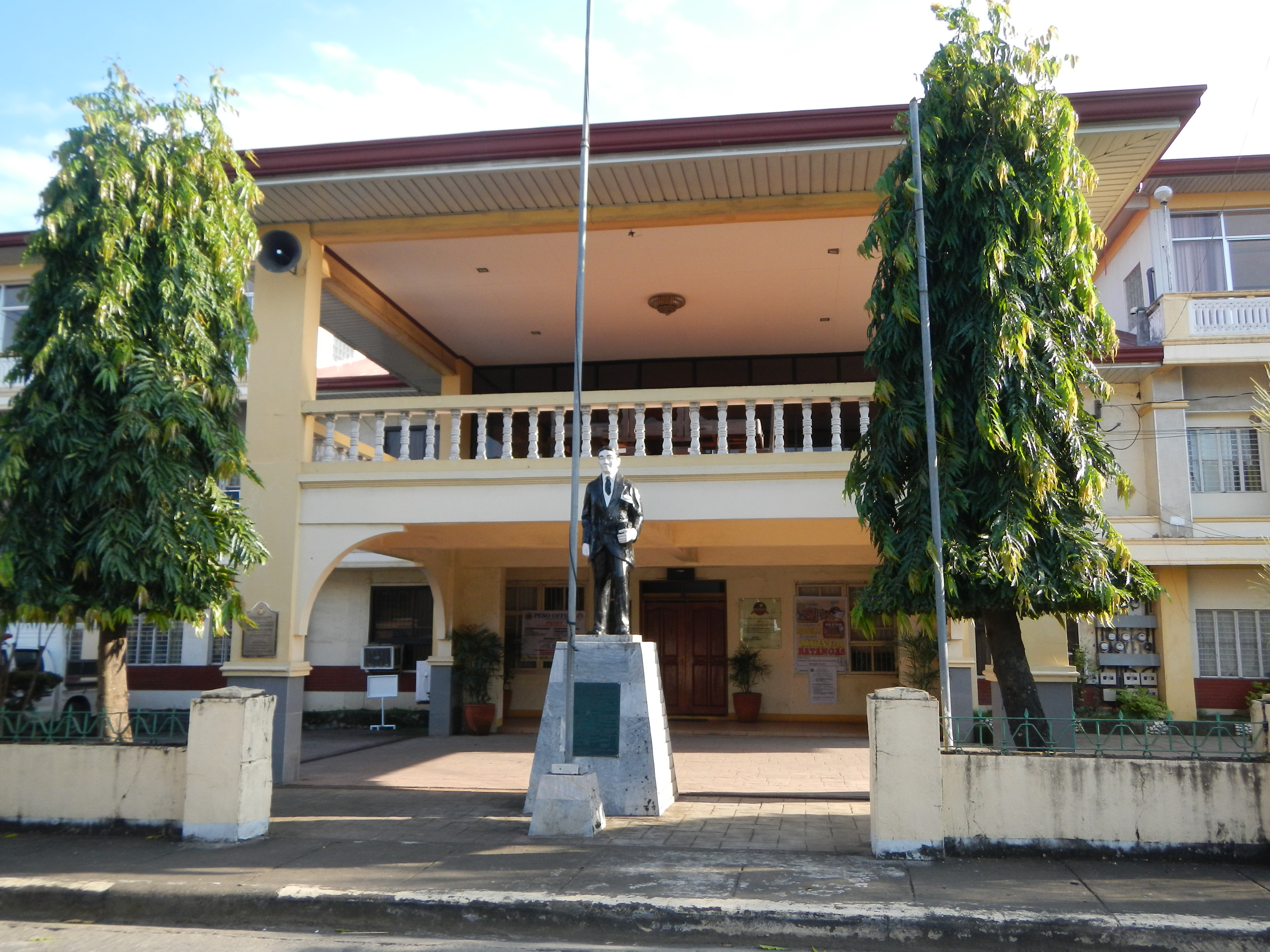
Municipal hall

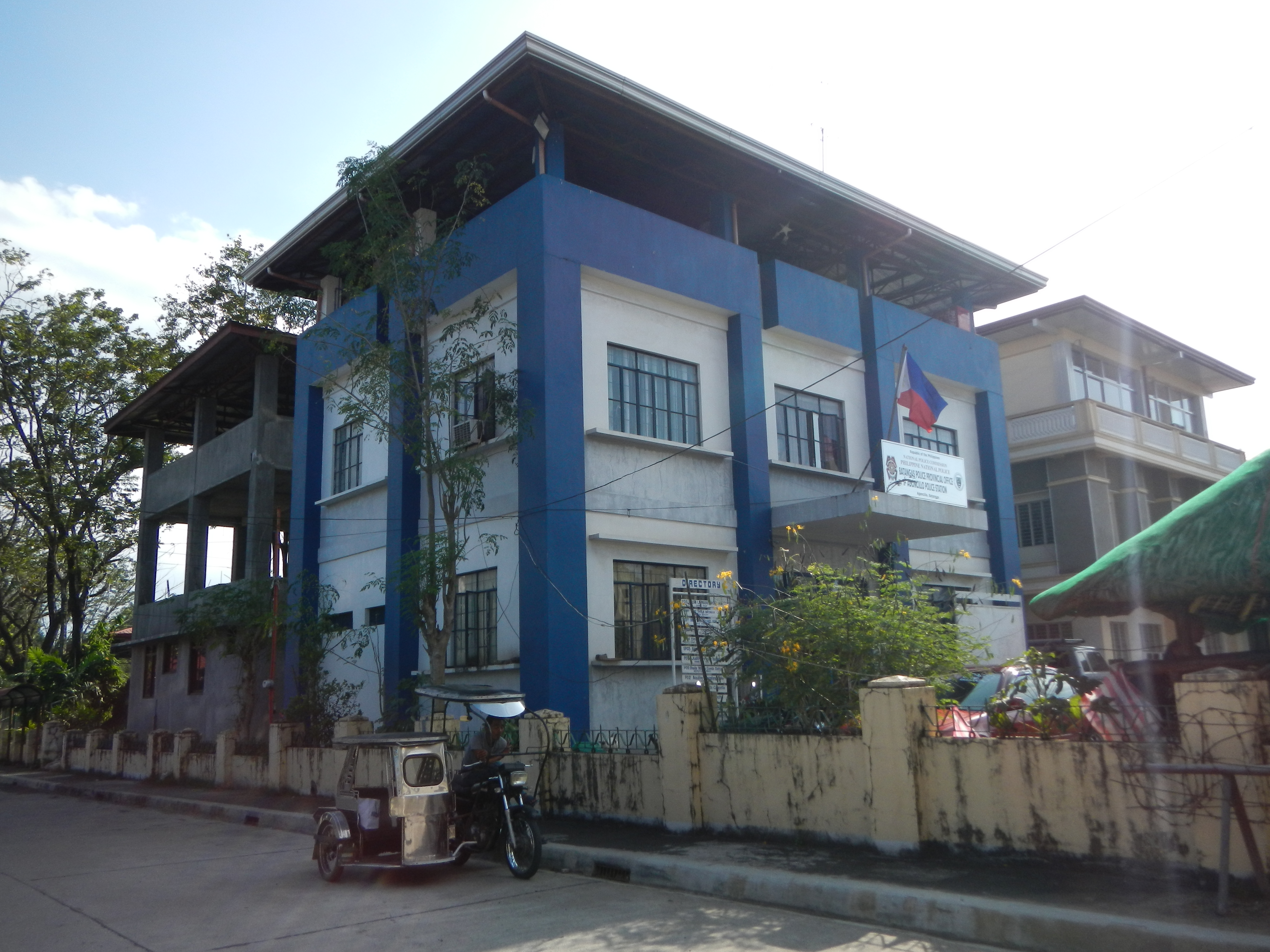
Police station

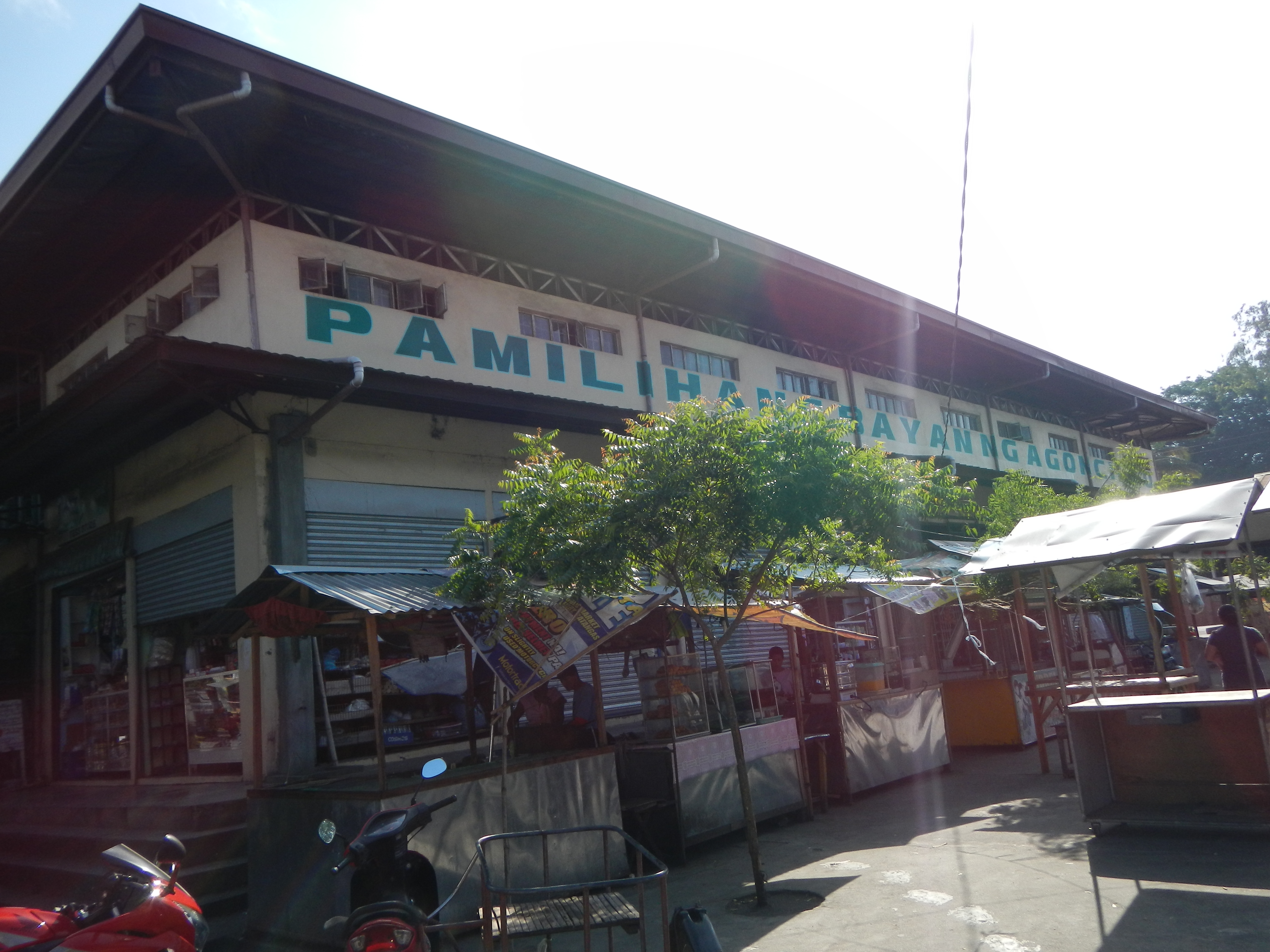
Public market

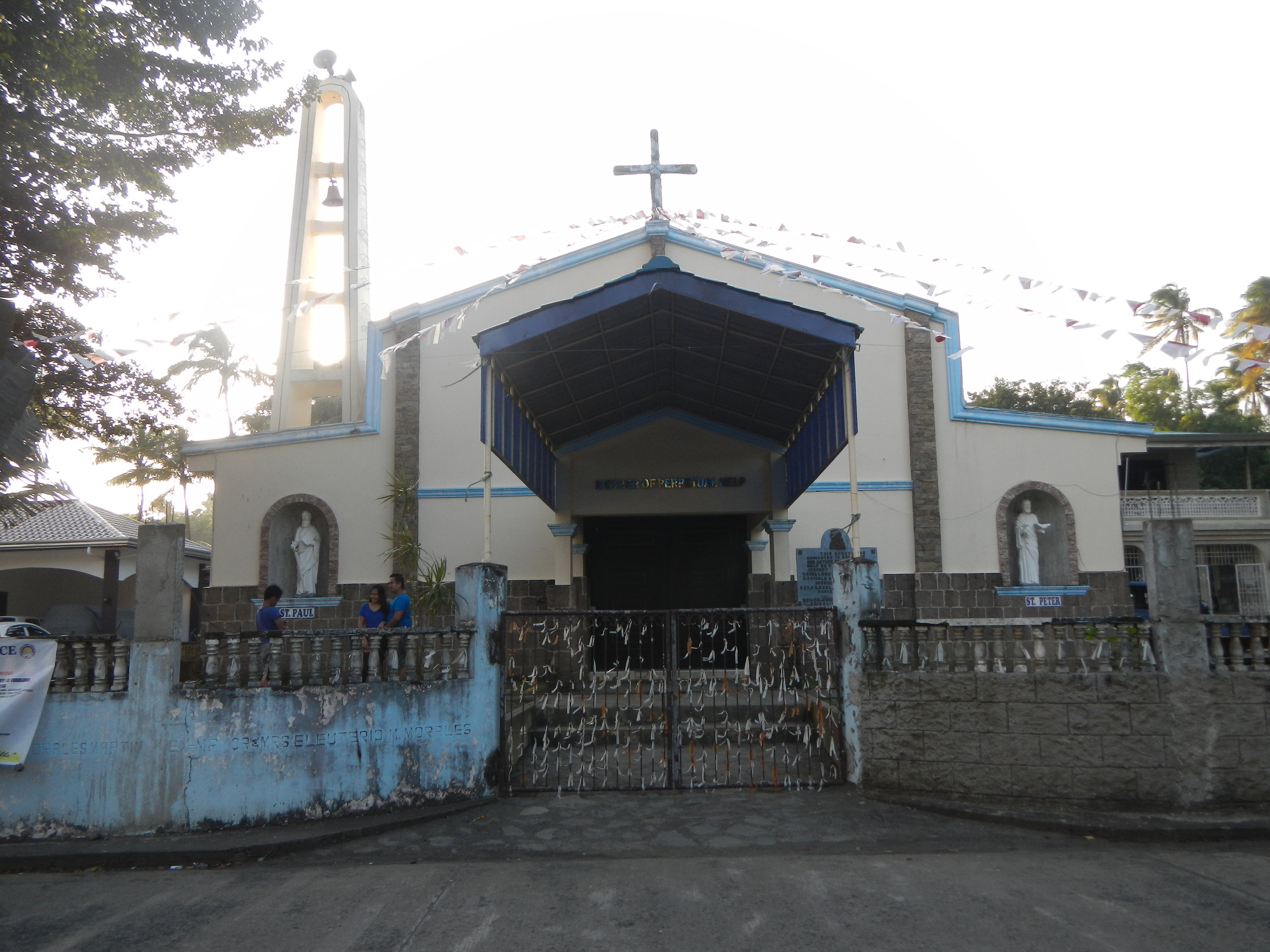
Our Mother of Perpetual Help Parish Church
