= Balayan Bay =

Bay in Luzon, Philippines

- Location in Luzon Location in the Philippines
- Location: Luzon, Philippines
- Coordinates: 13°50′N 120°47′E
- Part of: Verde Island Passage
- Max. width: 28 km (17 mi)

Balayan Bay is a large bay of Luzon Island in the Philippines. It is part of the Verde Island Passage and its entire shore is in the province of Batangas. The bay is between 23 and 28 kilometres (14 and 17 mi) wide. It is separated from the South China Sea to the west by the Calatagan Peninsula, which has Cape Santiago as its southern point. The Calumpan Peninsula forms the bay's eastern side, that separates it from Batangas Bay.

The name comes from the Sri-Visayan word ba-i or balai, meaning "house". Together with the Tagalog suffix “-an”, Balayan thus means "a group of houses" or "settlement".

The following municipalities line the bay from west to east: Calatagan, Balayan, Calaca, Lemery, Taal, San Luis, Bauan, and Mabini.

Together with the Verde Island Passage, the bay was once known for its abundant fish biodiversity and yields (that were up to six times higher there compared to other similar fishing grounds in the Philippines). But in the early 2000s, a drop in fish catch was noticed. In particular, sardine, anchovy, and round scad stocks were declining as a result of overfishing. By 2014, the decline was so severe that it led to seasonal fishing closures.

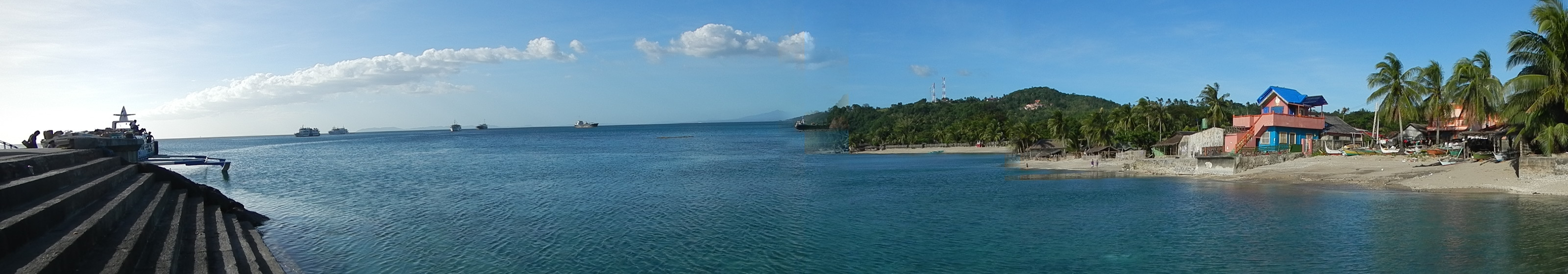
Balayan Bay as seen from the Port of Anilao
