= Sanctuary of St. Paschal Baylon =

Sanctuary in Villarreal, Spain

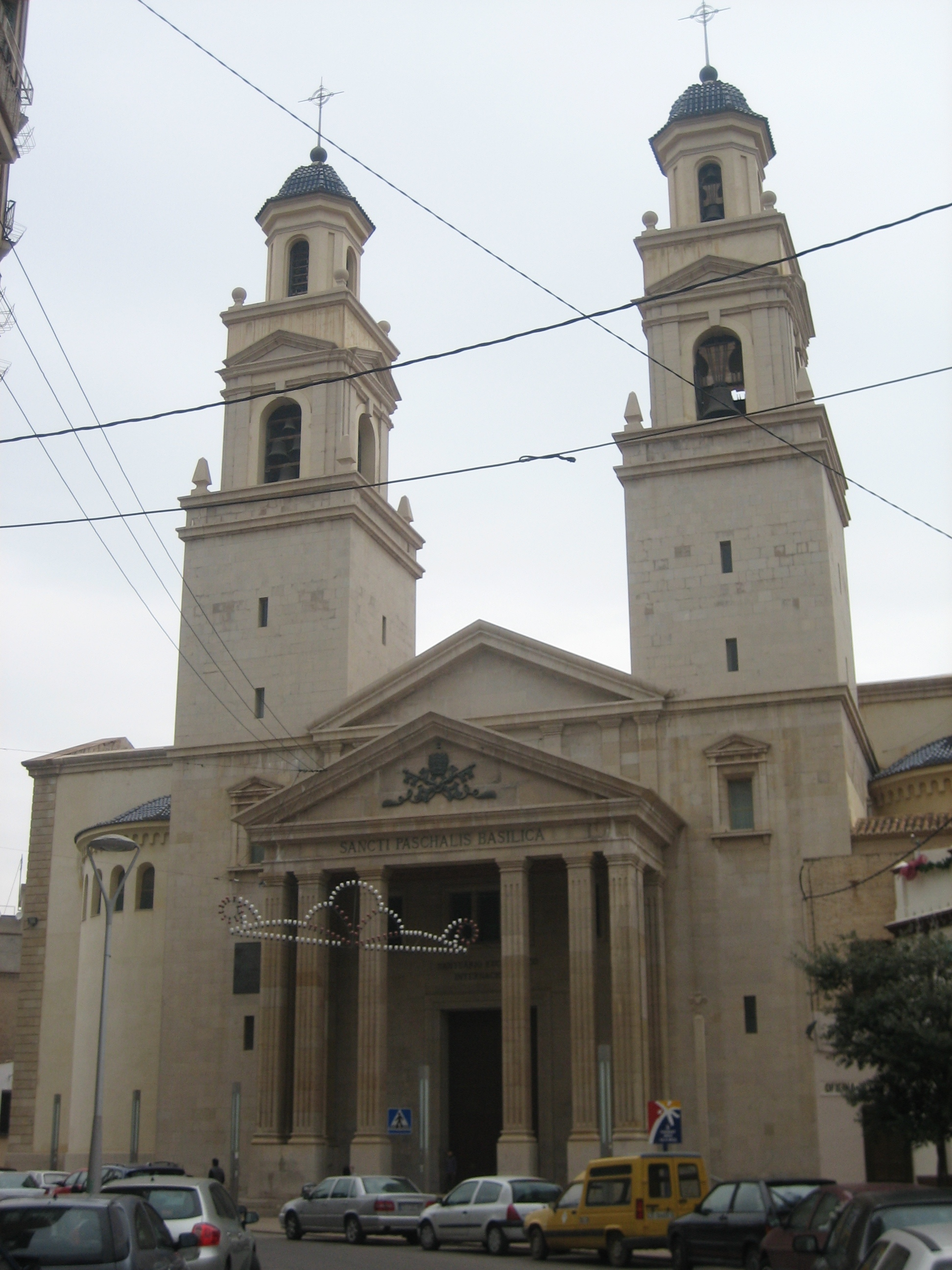
- 39.9397°N 0.097683°W
- Location: Villareal
- Country: Spain
- Denomination: Catholic Church

History
- Dedication: Paschal Baylón

Architecture
- Style: Baroque architecture

Administration
- Diocese: Segorbe-Castellón

The Sanctuary of St. Paschal Baylon (Valencian: Santuari de Sant Pasqual Bailón), commonly referred to as El Sant, is located in Villarreal, in the province of Castellón, Spain. The complex consists of the "International Eucharistic Votive Temple", proclaimed a minor basilica by Pope John Paul II, the Royal Chapel with the tomb of Saint Paschal Baylon, the museum of the Pouet del Sant and the cloistered convent of the Poor Clare Mothers.

The convent has its origins in the 16th century, but it is thanks to the fact that Saint Paschal Baylon lived, died and was buried there, that it achieved fame and importance as a place of pilgrimage. The Royal Chapel, built in the 17th century to house the remains of the saint, was considered the first monument of Valencian Baroque in terms of time and merit. However, the old convent church and the Baroque chapel were destroyed by an arson attack in 1936 during the Spanish Civil War. The new church is not finished, although it is open for worship. The new Royal Chapel, inaugurated in 1992 by King Juan Carlos I of Spain, is finished.

The restoration of the monastery has consolidated such characteristic vestiges as the cloister, the staircase, the De Profundis room, and in the refectory, the seat occupied by the saint in front of that of Blessed Andrés Hibernón. The two bell towers house a carillon of 72 bells and a set of 12 swinging bells, including the largest swinging bell in the world.

== History ==
The origins of the sanctuary date back to the 16th century, when in 1575 Pope Gregory XIII by means of a papal bull granted permission to the Franciscan Order, which had been reformed by St. Peter of Alcantara, to create a new convent in the lands of the Kingdom of Valencia. At first the friars settled in the Hermitage Mare de Déu de Gràcia (Virgin of Grace), on the banks of the Mijares River, in the same town of Villarreal, but finally, the Jurors of the municipality authorized them to occupy a small hermitage on the outskirts of the town, although they had to dispute the place with the Dominicans who also wanted it. The hermitage was located in the suburb of the road to Castellón, the current "Arrabal de San Pascual", which receives this name because of the presence of the convent and the temple.

The chapel was dedicated to Our Lady of the Rosary and had been founded on October 14, 1571, by the people of Villarreal to celebrate the Christian victory in the Battle of Lepanto against the Ottoman Empire on October 7 of that same year, the festivity of the Virgin of the Rosary and hence its dedication. The Barefoot Franciscans from Alcantar settled in the chapel in November 1578 and proceeded to expand it and build the new convent, while respecting the dedication of the chapel to the Virgin of the Rosary. In its construction they followed the austerity rules of the order, as can still be seen in the cloister, interior stairs, De profundis room, refectory and exterior walls.

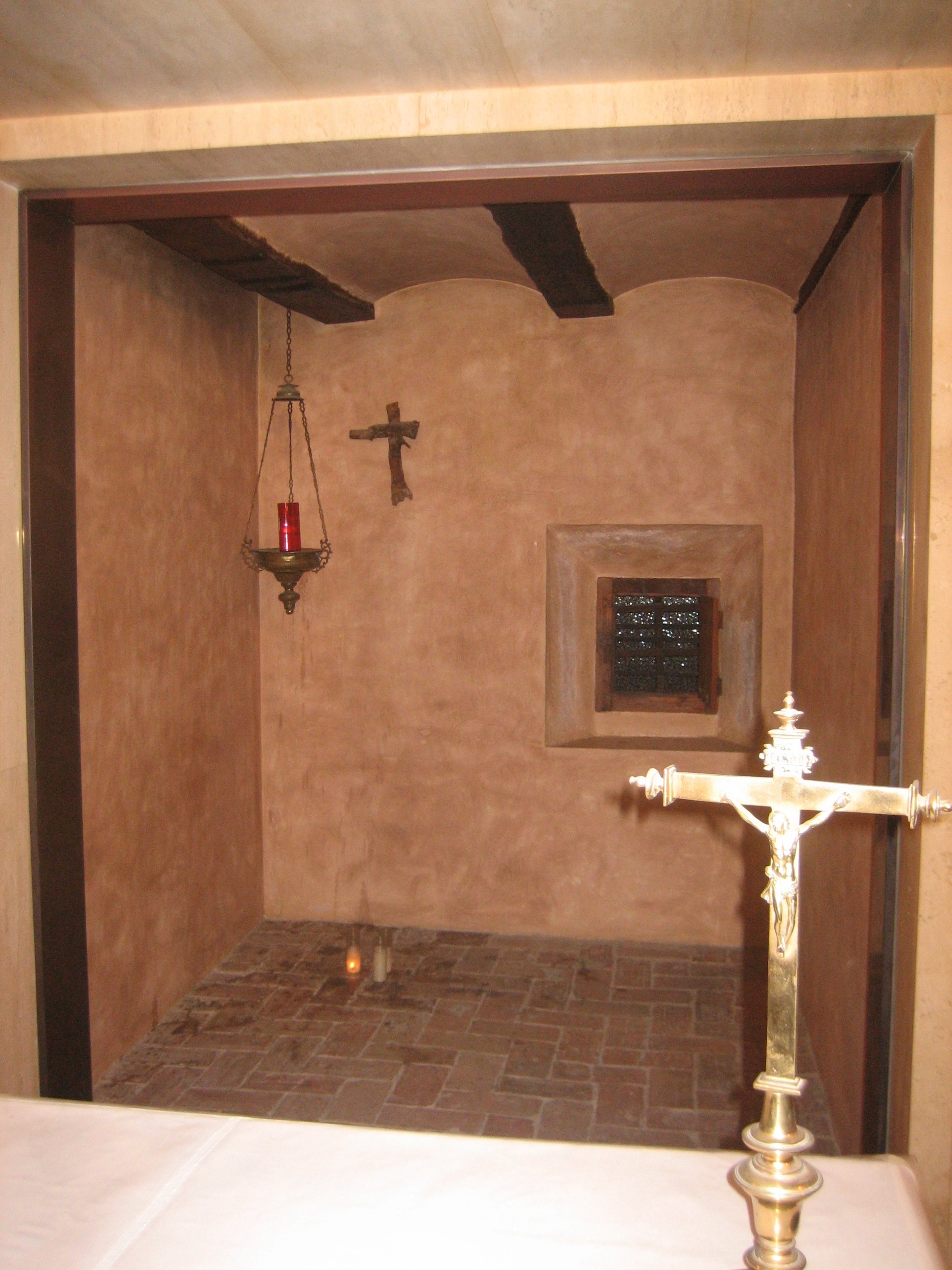
Cell where St. Paschal Baylon lived and died in the convent of Villarreal

The fame and impact of this monastery is due to the Alcantarine friar Saint Paschal Baylón. He had already visited the monastery in 1587 but was assigned to Villarreal in 1589, where he lived until his death in 1592. That same year, a well of beneficial waters, known as the Pouet del Sant, was dug in the cloister. Upon his death, the friars themselves buried his body in the same church, at the foot of the altar of the Immaculate Conception, due to the fame of sanctity he had achieved in life, and it was there that the faithful venerated his remains. Philip II of Spain approved the process of beatification, a process promoted by his son Philip III. In 1599 the same Philip III and his wife Margaret of Austria visited the sanctuary to visit the tomb of St. Paschal.

In 1706, during the course of the War of the Spanish Succession, the town of Villarreal was assaulted by Bourbon troops under the orders of the Count of Las Torres. During the assault, the troops set fire to the convent's archives and destroyed several outbuildings. Due to these damages, in 1721 the convent was renovated and a second cloister was built, located next to the original one. In the 18th century, specifically in 1791 and on the occasion of the first centenary of the canonization of St. Paschal, great celebrations were organized and a large number of bullfights were authorized for the benefit of the convent in the square next to the convent.

In the 19th century, due to the Napoleonic invasion, the friars of the convent hid the body of the saint, being restored to its usual place on July 31, 1812. In 1835 the religious community was exclaustrated due to the Spanish Confiscation, but the following year, in 1836, the convent was again occupied, this time by the Franciscan nuns from the convent of Saint Clare de Castellón de la Plana. On May 15, 1899, there was a National Pilgrimage to the tomb of the saint. On March 28, 1908, a decree of the Holy See recognized the right of the community of Poor Clare nuns over the Royal Chapel with the tomb of the saint.

On July 7, 1911, a Valencian pilgrimage was held to close the Eucharistic Congress held in Madrid and on August 8 of the same year a new bell-gable was built for the placement of two new bells. On August 13, 1936, in the first months of the Spanish Civil War, the sanctuary was desecrated and burned by an anarchist group from outside the city. Once the war was over, on May 17, 1942, the festivity of St. Paschal, the first stone of the new temple was laid, since the previous one had been reduced to rubble. The new project was launched thanks to anonymous donations from the faithful, and reconstruction began on June 13, 1949. In May 1971, the first stage was completed, the first stone was laid on May 17 of that year and the altar was consecrated on the 23rd of the same month. During this period, the remains of the saint left the sanctuary, specifically on July 30, 1960, when they were taken to Munich for the Eucharistic Congress held in the German city; the relics were carried in a reliquary designed by Julio Fuster. In February 1974, coinciding with the events of the 7th centenary of the foundation of Villarreal, it was opened for worship and consecration with the blessing of the austere temple by the Provincial of the Franciscan Order.

At the end of the 20th century a new impulse was given to the works of the new temple. Thus, for the centenary of the death in 1991 and the canonization of St. Paschal in 1992, the main facade was completed and the two bell towers were erected. The sculptural group by José Ortells from Villarreal was also installed on the main altar for the exposition of the Blessed Sacrament and the construction of the new Royal Chapel that houses the remains of the saint, the work of Vicente Lloréns Poy, also a sculptor from Villarreal. On March 25, 1996, Pope John Paul II granted the temple the dignity of minor basilica, while naming St. Paschal Baylon "Universal Patron of Eucharistic Worship". On September 15, 1997, the 7th National Eucharistic Congress was held.

== Temple ==
=== Former convent church ===
When the Alcantarine friars settled in the hermitage of the Rosary in 1578, they proceeded to build a church for the convent. This temple was burned down in August 1936, in the first months of the Civil War, so it no longer exists. The new "International Eucharistic Votive Temple" was built on the remains of the fire.

The old convent church, with a single nave with groin vault and no crossing, consisted of four bays. In the first of these, from the main door, there was a choir loft. The nave had Corinthian pillars and chapels on the sides between the buttresses; these chapels were dedicated to St. Anthony of Padua, St. John the Baptist and the Virgin of Sorrows. In the second section there was an oval chapel dedicated to St. Peter of Alcantara, whose first stone was laid on May 24, 1764, and whose works were completed on July 26, 1765. An image of the saint by Ignacio Vergara was later installed in this chapel and it was decorated with paintings by José Vergara, brother of the former, who finished the paintings depicting the glorification of several Franciscan saints on August 28, 1765.

The main altar was dedicated to the Virgin of the Rosary, to whom the original hermitage where the friars settled was dedicated. The altars to St. Francis of Assisi and the Immaculate Conception were located on the sides.

=== Contemporary church ===
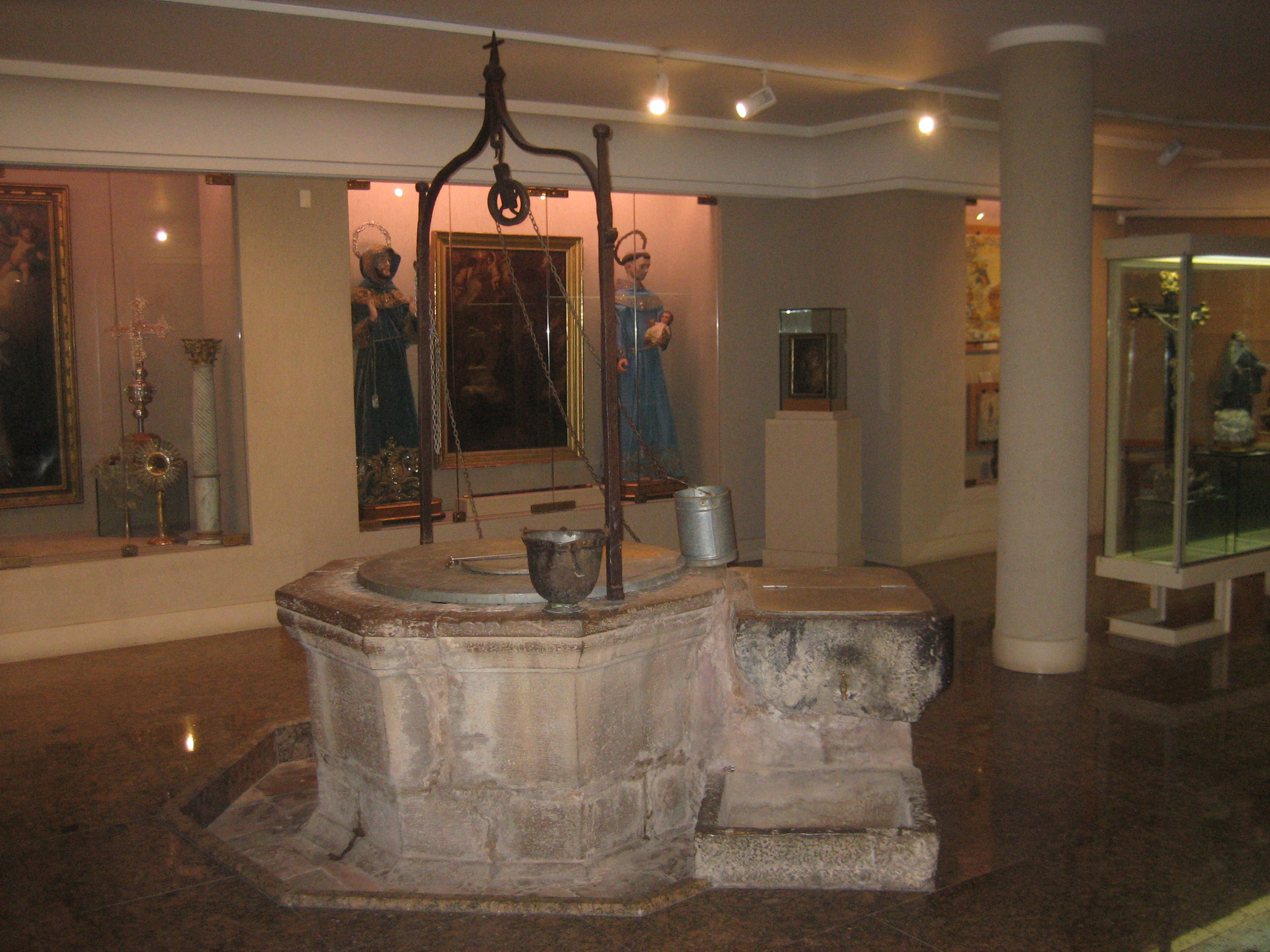
Pouet del Sant in the museum room of the same name

The presbytery is presided over by a silver monstrance supported by two golden carved angels, work of the sculptor José Ortells, from 1952, which were previously used to hold the remains of the saint. With similar architectural style a small chapel adjacent to the portico, in the enclosure of the gate, keeps the image of St. Peter of Alcántara, work of Ignacio Vergara, which could be saved from the fire of 1936. Some pieces of artistic and historical value from between the 16th and 20th centuries, saved from the fire of 1936, remain on display in the museum room of the Pouet del Sant (Well of the Saint), on the first floor of the Royal Chapel.

== Royal Chapel ==
When in 1674 Pope Clement X promoted the process of canonization of the already blessed Paschal Baylón, the municipal council of Villarreal and the community of Alcantarinos decided to build a chapel next to the church of the convent where the remains of the friar would be placed in an urn. In six years the works of the new chapel were finished and it was then when a confrontation took place between the municipal authorities and those in charge of the Franciscan Province of San Juan Bautista, due to the fact that both parties wanted to place their coat of arms in a preferential place on the retable of the chapel. The conflict reached the General Governorate of Valencia but was resolved by reaching a consensus. Both parties agreed to offer the patronage of the new chapel to King Charles II of Spain.

The Spanish monarch accepted the offer to preside over the patronage and ordered to place his own coat of arms in a prominent place by means of a Royal Order of April 18, 1681 issued in the Palace of Aranjuez. Only nine days later, the body of St. Paschal was solemnly transferred to its new tomb, with the outstanding presence of the Count of Aguilar, Viceroy of Valencia.

=== Baroque Chapel ===
The baroque chapel was an artistic jewel of the Valencian baroque. The wide enclosure of the chapel, enriched with time, had the walls decorated with sgraffito paintings, ceramic panels with plant motifs and plinths with Eucharistic motifs. A series of eight paintings on canvas by Domingo Saura represented various miracles of St. Paschal. The main work of the chapel was the baroque altarpiece of gilded wood with the glass urn containing the incorrupt body of the saint. The rear dressing room was accessed by lateral stairs, a place with baroque decoration where the body of the saint from Alcantar could be observed and venerated.

Like the convent church, the Royal Chapel was burned in August 1936, a few months after the start of the Spanish Civil War. After the fire, some of the faithful recovered the relics of the saint that had been saved and were kept in the archpriestly church of St. James. They remained there until 1952, when in the cell of the convent where the saint lived a dressing room was set up and where in a silver urn, supported by a sculptural group by José Ortells, the remains of the saint were deposited. The transfer took place on June 2 and was attended by numerous ecclesiastical authorities and dignitaries who had been present at the Eucharistic Congress held in Barcelona. This sculptural group was later used for the exposition of the Blessed Sacrament on the main altar of the new church.

=== Contemporary chapel ===
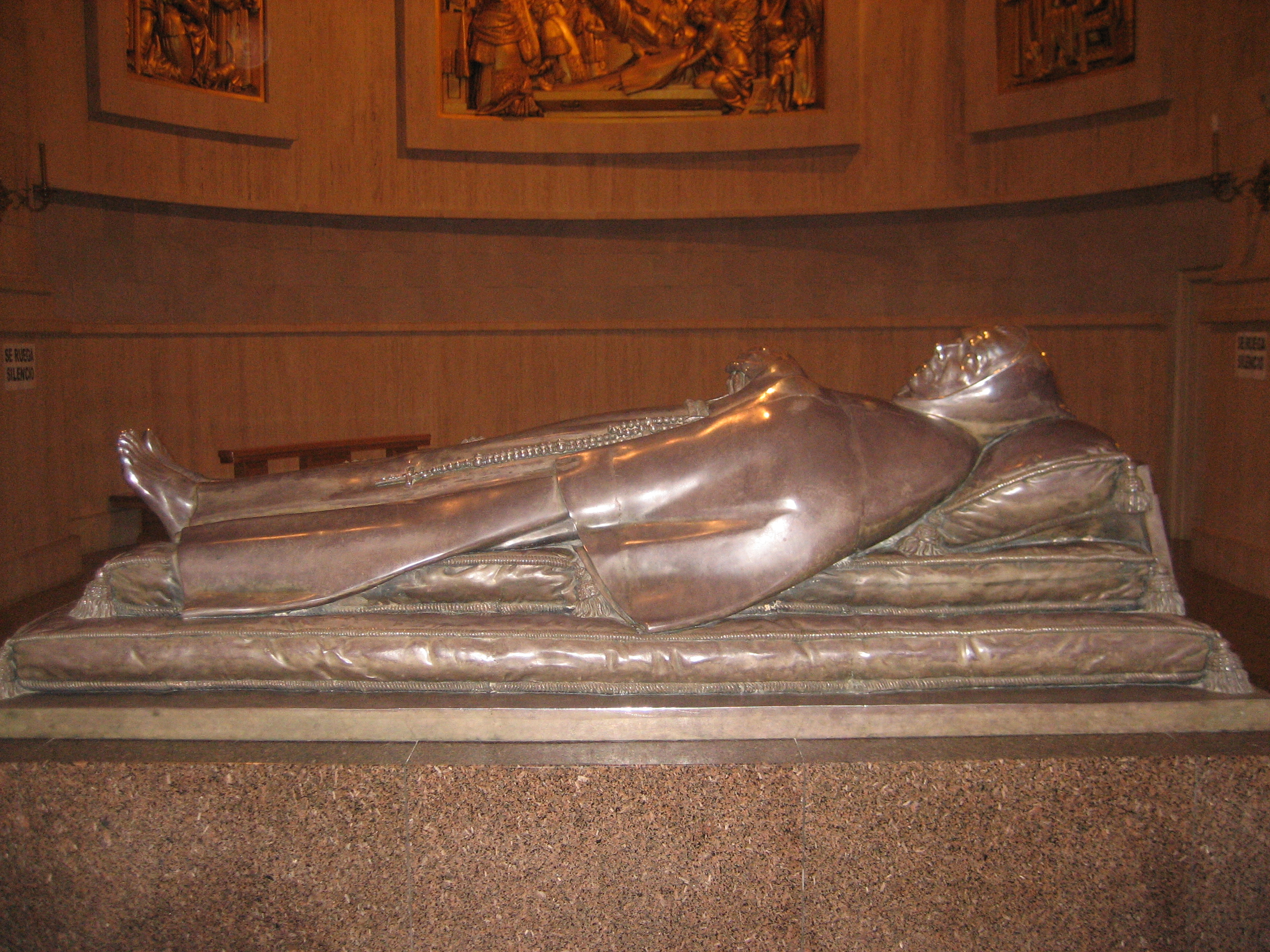
Sepulcher of St. Paschal Baylon, silver work of Vicente Lloréns Poy

On May 17, 1992, on the occasion of the 4th centenary of the saint's death, the new Royal Chapel was inaugurated, sculpted by Vicente Lloréns Poy, and the remains of the saint were placed in the new silver tomb that represents the lying body of St. Paschal. The tomb is a recumbent statue of the saint carved in 300 kg of silver and with a granite base with two steps that allow the faithful to approach it. The sculpture was inspired by the incorrupt body that was venerated before the fire of 1936 and is located in front of the old cell of the saint, in front of which there is the devotional letter of St. Paschal, handwritten by the saint himself.

Above the cell is the 14 meter high altarpiece with fifty figures gilded with fine gold. The central panel of the altarpiece depicts the Glorification of St. Paschal, with the Eucharistic symbols, given his patronage of the Eucharistic Congresses, and surrounded by angels. Below it is the representation of the death of St. Paschal, flanked on each side by the shields with holding angels of Charles II of Spain, who was the first protector of the chapel, and of Juan Carlos I of Spain, in whose reign the new chapel was inaugurated and who expressly accepted that his coat of arms be placed in it and who represent the Royal Patronage.

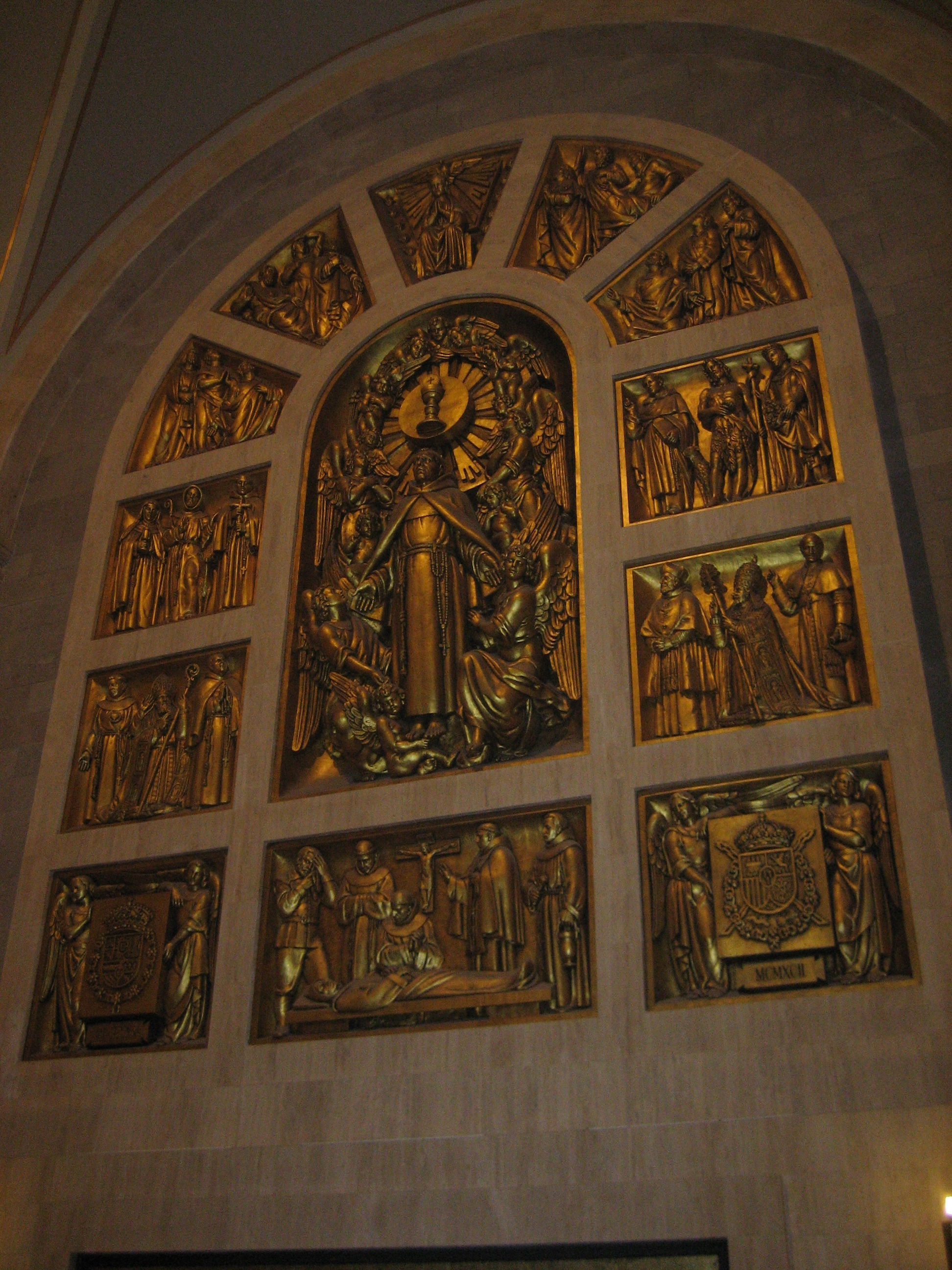
Altarpiece of St. Paschal in the Royal Chapel, work of the sculptor from Villarreal Vicente Lloréns Poy.

In the keystone of the central arch of the altarpiece is the image of the Holy Spirit and the Virgin Mary under the title of Our Lady of Grace, patron saint of the town. The four remaining panels of the arch of the altarpiece contain the figures of the twelve apostles, three in each of them. The right side of the altarpiece, and in ascending order, contains the figures of St. Robert Bellarmine and Popes Alexander VIII and Leo XIII. In the upper panel are St. Vincent Ferrer, St. John the Baptist and St. Elizabeth of Portugal. On the left side are St. Juan de Ribera and Blessed Nicolás Factor and Andrés Hibernón, companion of St. Paschal, in the lower panel, and St. Clare of Assisi, St. Francis of Assisi and St. Peter of Alcántara in the upper panel.

The Royal Chapel also has a Eucharistic relief in gilded bronze in the tabernacle, at the foot of the sepulcher, and a cycle of six sculptural panels on the sides in the form of semicircular apses, representing some moments in the life of St. Paschal. At the entrance to the chapel there are panels with the following scenes: "The young shepherd Paschal receives the Alcantarine sackcloth from St. Francis and St. Clare", "The stoning of St. Paschal in French lands and the triumph of the Eucharist" and "St. Paschal, writer and master of novices". In the frontal apse are the scenes: " St. Paschal exercising charity", "The funeral of the Saint" and "Interview of Father Ximénez with Philip II to promote the canonization of St. Paschal".

The local stone and Roman travertine cladding matches the granite of the floor, the patinated gold of the reliefs and the chiseled metal of the gates, votive lamps, candlesticks, sconces and other decorative elements.

== Carillon and set of turning bells ==
On May 17, 1998, the day of the festivity of St. Paschal, the carillon and the set of swinging bells that house the two bell towers of the basilica were inaugurated. The 84 bells were blessed by Cardinal Antonio María Javierre. Both the carillon and the set of swinging bells were donated to the basilica and the people of Villarreal by local businessman José Gómez Mata. The inaugural carillon concert, which was recorded and distributed free of charge, was performed by Belgian carillonist Aimé Lombaert. On the anniversary in 2001, an extraordinary concert was held in honor of St. Paschal and in memory of Ana Viñes Rubert, wife of José Gómez, performed by the Japanese Yuko M. Tajima, carillonist of the Alte Nicolaikirche of Frankfurt am Main.

The bells that make up the carillon, weighing 23,500 kg (51,800 lb) of bronze excluding accessories, were designed and installed by the Belgian company Clock-o-Matic and manufactured by the Dutch company Royal Eijsbouts, while the set of 12 turning bells of the east tower was manufactured by the company Fonderie Paccard in Haute-Savoie and installed by the Badalona company Ermec.org. The set of bells of the twin towers of the basilica are the largest musical instrument in the world as they have the largest number of bells in existence.

There are eight automated turning bells, of about 6,000 kg (13,000 lb) of total weight without accessories and located all of them in the East Tower, are distributed on two floors and their religious names are: Santísimo Sacramento, San Pascual, Virgen de Gracia, Virgen Purísima, Virgen del Rosario, San Francisco de Asís, San Pedro de Alcántara, Santa Clara, San José, Santa Ana, Natividad del Señor and Espíritu Santo. The remaining four bells of this tower are fixed and are rung by electromotive hammer. The bell of DO 3, called Santísimo Sacramento, located on the second floor and weighing 2,000 kg (4,400 lb) in bronze and 3,360 kg (7,410 lb) counting its accessories, is the largest swinging bell in the world; it measures 1.5 m (4 ft 11 in) in diameter. The set of 12 bells is musically tuned and can be turned manually.

The 72 bells of the carillon are located in the west tower. The largest of them weighs 2,200 kg (4,900 lb) and the smallest of them weighs only 6 kg (13 lb).

== Visitas ==
=== Royal visits ===
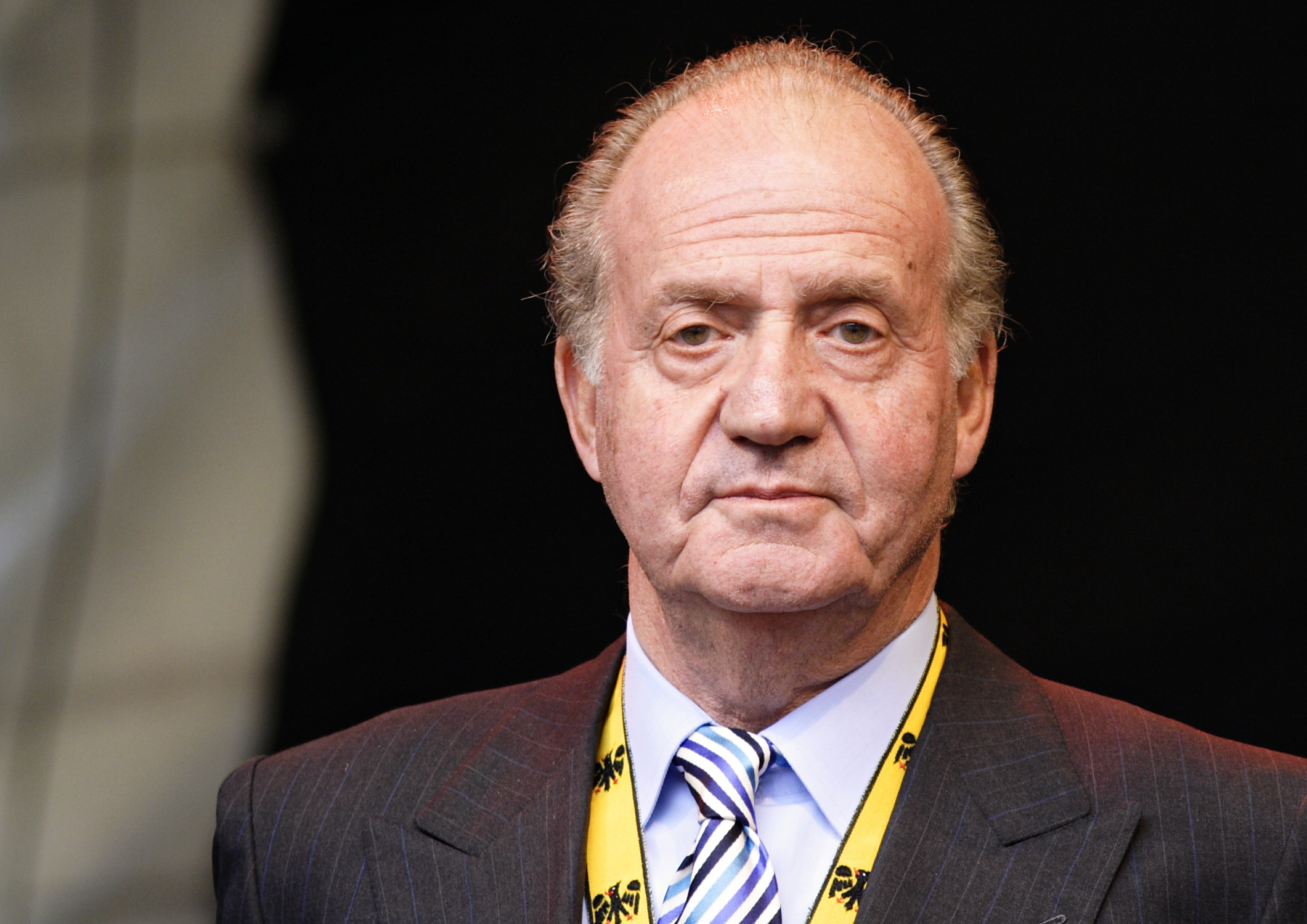
King Juan Carlos I inaugurated the Royal Chapel in 1992, on the occasion of the 4th Centenary of the death of St. Paschal.

Several monarchs have visited the Sanctuary of St. Paschal, and on May 17, 1992, the festivity of St. Paschal and celebrating the fourth centenary of the death of the saint, the acts were presided over by HM King Juan Carlos I. After attending the solemn mass in the temple of the sanctuary, the king inaugurated the new Royal Chapel that was placed under his protection, as shown by the inclusion of his coat of arms on the altarpiece. The blessing of the chapel was carried out by Cardinal Vicente Enrique y Tarancón, a person closely linked to the city and a native of neighboring Burriana. Juan Carlos I, accompanied by Queen Sofia, had already visited the Sanctuary of St. Paschal on December 2, 1976.

Previously, the kings of the House of Hadsburg, Philip III, accompanied by his wife Margaret of Austria, and Philip IV, accompanied by Prince Balthasar Charles of Austria, had visited the sanctuary.

The House of Bourbon also visited the sanctuary in the past. In the 18th century it was visited by Charles III of Spain and his wife Maria Amalia of Saxony. In 1802 it was visited by Charles IV of Spain, his wife Maria Luisa of Parma, the then Infante Ferdinand, the Etrurian King Louis I, his wife Maria Luisa of Spain and the Prime Minister of Spain, Godoy. Ferdinand VII visited the sanctuary again on October 26, 1827, when he was on his way to Catalonia. In 1845, Queen Isabella II of Spain, her mother Maria Cristina and the Infanta Luisa Fernanda visited the sanctuary on their way to Barcelona. Isabel II visited the sanctuary again, accompanied on that occasion by the then Infante Alfonso, and on July 8, 1912, it was the Infanta Isabel, known as "La Chata", who visited the sanctuary, giving a silver desk set as a gift. King Amadeo I of Spain also visited the sanctuary on September 9, 1871, and Alfonso XIII in 1905.

=== Other visits ===
On June 18, 1921, there was a Catalan-Valencian pilgrimage to the sanctuary, previously suspended due to the outbreak of the First World War. On June 14, 1958, it was Francisco Franco, head of state, who visited the tomb of the saint.

On May 3, 1993, Herman Schalück, General of the Franciscan friars, visited the sanctuary and blessed the reliefs of the altarpiece of the Royal Chapel on the occasion of the 8th centenary of the birth of St. Clare. That same year, Mario Tagliaferri, Papal Nuncio, visited the sanctuary. On May 16, he participated in the traditional offering of flowers to St. Paschal and in the lighting of the bonfire, and presided at the solemn Mass on May 17, the saint's feast day, at the same time that he inaugurated the 45th International Eucharistic Congress held in Seville.
