= Torrehermosa =

- municipality
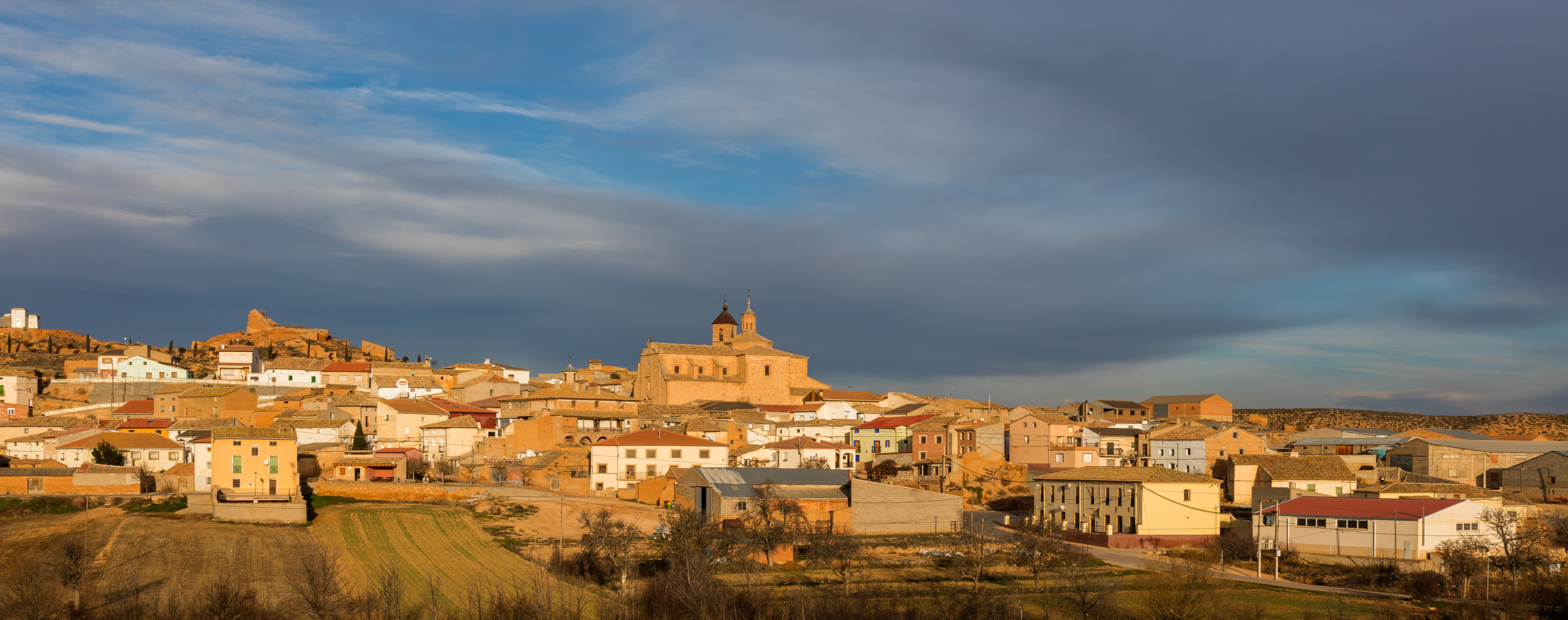
- Torrehermosa

- Coat of arms

- Location within Spain
- Coordinates: 41°14′N 2°07′W}
- Country: Spain
- Autonomous community: Aragon
- Province: Zaragoza

Area
  - Total: 21 km^{2} (8.1 sq mi)

Population (2025-01-01)
  - Total: 69
  - Density: 3.3/km^{2} (8.5/sq mi)
- Time zone: UTC+1 (CET)
  - Summer (DST): UTC+2 (CEST)
- Website: http://www.torrehermosa.net

Torrehermosa (Aragonese: Torre Fermosa) is a municipality located in the province of Zaragoza, Aragon, Spain. According to the 2004 census (INE), the municipality has a population of 102 inhabitants. It was the birthplace of St. Paschal Baylon.

== See also ==
- List of municipalities in Zaragoza
