= Paschal Baylón =

Spanish Catholic lay brother (1540–1592)

Saint Paschal Baylón OFM
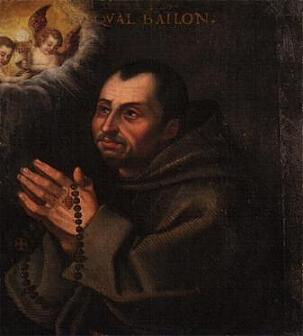

Confessor
- Born: 16 May 1540; Torrehermosa, Kingdom of Aragon, Spain
- Died: 17 May 1592 (aged 52); Villarreal, Kingdom of Valencia, Spain
- Venerated in: Catholic Church
- Beatified: 29 October 1618, Saint Peter's Basilica, Papal States by Pope Paul V
- Canonized: 16 October 1690, Saint Peter's Basilica, Papal States by Pope Alexander VIII
- Feast: 17 May
- Attributes: Monstrance; Franciscan habit; Before the Eucharist
- Patronage: Villarreal; Torrehermosa; Alconchel de Ariza; Eucharistic congresses; Eucharistic associations; Obando; Cooks; Shepherds, Male Children and Priesthood Vocation; Diocese of Segorbe-Castellón de la Plana

Paschal Baylón (16 May 1540 – 17 May 1592) was a Spanish Catholic religious brother in the Order of Friars Minor.

He served as a shepherd alongside his father in his childhood and adolescence, but desired to enter the religious life. He was refused once but later was admitted as a Franciscan lay brother and became noted for his strict austerities, as well as his love for and compassion towards the sick.

He was sent to Paris, France; on the way he encountered Calvinists and was nearly killed by a mob. He was best known for his strong and deep devotion to the Eucharist.

The process for his canonization opened and in 1618 he was beatified. Pope Alexander VIII canonized him a saint on 16 October 1690.

On 28 November 1897, Pope Leo XIII proclaimed Baylón patron of Eucharistic congresses and confraternities.

== Early life ==
Paschal Baylón was born on 16 May 1540 at Torrehermosa, in the Kingdom of Aragon (part of the Spanish Empire) on the feast of the Pentecost to the poor but pious peasants Martin and Elizabeth Jubera Baylón. He was named Paschal in honour of Pascua de Pentecosta, for local custom required that a child be called after the saint or feast day on which it was born. He had a brother and two sisters.

From his seventh to his twenty-fourth year, he led the life of a shepherd, and during the whole of that period exercised a salutary influence upon his companions.

His mother gave him the Little Office of the Blessed Virgin Mary. He learned to read by asking people for help with the words. Not having any other means to relieve the poor, he always gave them a part of his own dinner which was sent him into the fields. To help support the family, Paschal was hired out by his father to tend the flocks of others. Some of his companions were much inclined to cursing, quarrelling, and fighting; but learnt to hold their tongue in his presence since they respected his pious nature and his virtue. He was extremely honest, even offering to compensate owners of crops for any damage that his sheep caused.

== Friar ==
Those to whom he first mentioned his inclination to religious life, recommended several richly endowed monasteries, but he answered, "I was born poor and am resolved to die in poverty and penance".

He was at first denied the chance to join the Franciscans on account of his age, prompting him to return to his duties as a shepherd. In 1564 he joined the Reformed Franciscans as a religious brother and commenced his period of novitiate on 2 February before making his profession on 2 February 1565 in Orito at the Saint Joseph convent. He was urged to become an ordained priest but he felt that was not the path for him.

He had never more than one habit, and that always threadbare; he walked without sandals in the snow. He accommodated himself to all places and seasons. His jobs included serving as a cook and gardener as well as the official beggar who went around asking for alms. As porter his duties entailed tending to the poor who came to the friars' door. Paschal gained a reputation for his remarkable humility, unfailing courtesy, and generosity.

He lived this life in contemplation and silent meditation, often as he worked. He was contemplative and had frequent ecstatic visions. He would spend the night before the altar in silence some nights. But he also shrugged off those notions of him gaining a reputation coming from that pious nature. On one occasion, in the course of a journey through France, he defended the dogma of the Real Presence against a Calvinist preacher, and in consequence, narrowly escaped death at the hands of a Huguenot mob.

He died on 17 May 1592 in Villarreal after falling ill. His feast day is 17 May.

== Veneration ==
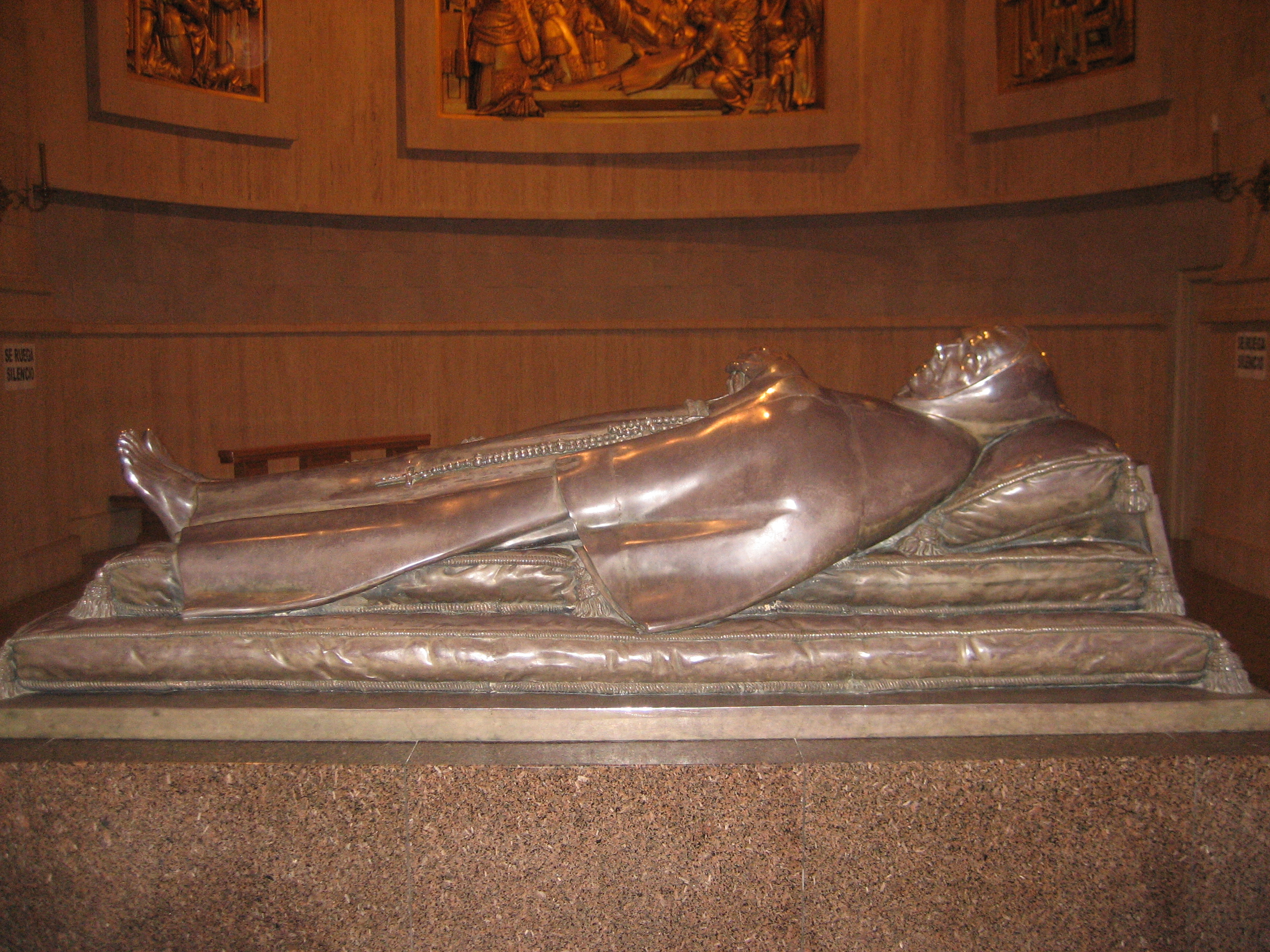
Sepulchre in Villarreal

His tomb in Villarreal became an immediate place of pilgrimage and there were soon miracles that were reported at his tomb. Pope Paul V beatified him on 29 October 1618, and Pope Alexander VIII canonized him on 16 October 1690. Pope Innocent XII published the Bull of Canonization, Rationi Congruit, on 15 July 1691.

In 1730, an indigenous Guatemalan claimed to have had a vision of a sainted Paschal appearing as a robed skeleton. This event became the basis of the heterodox tradition of San Pascualito.

Art often depicts him wearing the Franciscan habit and bearing a monstrance to signify his devotion to the Holy Eucharist. Pope John XXIII named the saint as the patron for the Segorbe diocese on 12 May 1961.

On 13 August 1936, during the Red Terror of the Spanish Civil War, anticlerical leftists disinterred and burned his body. The relics that remained were later transferred in the presence of King Juan Carlos I on 12 May 1992.

== Towns ==
- San Pascual, Batangas, Philippines
- Saint-Pascal, Quebec, Canada
- Saint-Pascal Baylon, Ontario, Canada
- San Pascual, Burias Island, Masbate, Philippines
- San Pascual, Obando, Bulacan, Philippines
- San Pascual Baylon, Guinarona Dagami, Leyte
- San Pascual Baylon, Tinambac, Camarines Sur
- San Pasqual Valley, San Diego, California, USA

== See also ==
- Saints of Obando
- Sanctuary of St. Paschal Baylon
