= Andrés Hibernón Real =

Blessed Andrés Hibernón Real O.F.M.
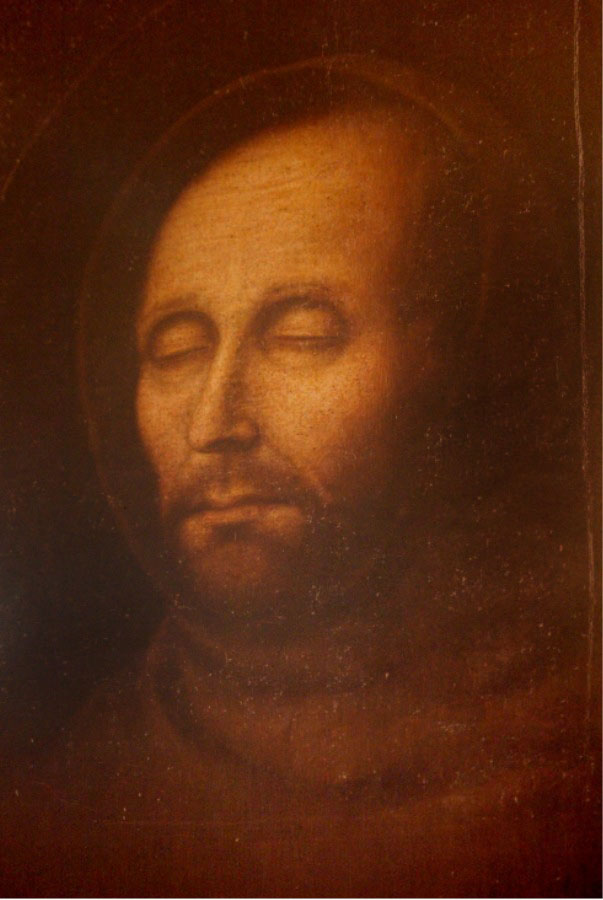

Religious
- Born: 1534; Murcia, Kingdom of Spain
- Died: 18 April 1602 (aged 68); Gandia, Valencia, Kingdom of Spain
- Venerated in: Roman Catholic Church
- Beatified: 22 May 1791, Saint Peter's Basilica, Papal States by Pope Pius VI
- Feast: 18 April
- Attributes: Franciscan habit
- Patronage: Murcia; Alcantarilla

Andrés Hibernón Real (1534 – 18 April 1602) was a Spanish, Roman Catholic, professed religious from the Order of Friars Minor. Hibernón was born to nobles who fell poor, and he was robbed when he sought to provide funds for his parents. This occurrence prompted him to revise his approach to material and spiritual goods and so he became a lay brother to cultivate his spiritual nature.

His beatification received formal approval from Pope Pius VI in mid-1791.

== Life ==
Although Andrés Hibernón Real was born in 1534 at his uncle's house in Murcia, he spent his childhood in Alcantarilla where his parents lived. He was baptized in the Murcia Cathedral where his uncle was a chaplain. Hibernón came from an old noble house that was reduced to poverty due to a range of adverse circumstances. His family had some land and Hibernón helped them with agricultural tasks. But after a few years of drought they had to send him to work with another uncle in Valencia who raised cattle. This uncle assumed charge of his initial education in order to relieve his parents of their economic burden.

In his late childhood and into adolescence he endeavored to earn funds that would support his parents and siblings. From the age of 14 he dedicated himself to caring for livestock and similar tasks. He frequented Marian shrines and had an ardent devotion to the Eucharist. By the age of twenty, he had saved eighty silver ducats and travelled back home to Murcia to help provide for his sister's impending marriage. En route home a group of thieves attacked him and stripped him of all he had. Hibernón interpreted this as a sign of how much he depended on material goods and so resolved to labor for the remainder of his life for other goods that people could not take from him.

== In the Franciscan Order ==
In Albacete in 1556 he sought admission to a convent of the Order of Friars Minor and was admitted on 1 November 1557 where he commenced his period of novitiate and received the habit.

In February 1563 he applied to Peter of Alcantara's discalced convent of San José in Elche, and in 1564 attended the vesting of the habit of Paschal Baylon. Elche was a house of studies. He remained there until 1574 save for a short duration of time in Villena. In 1574 his superiors sent him to undertake the establishment of a convent in Valencia where he became a friend and counselor of the Archbishop of Valencia Juan de Ribera.

In the course of his religious life Hibernón had occasion to live at a number of different friaries. Among the conventual activities that he carried out were the offices of cook, gardener, porter, janitor, and almoner, and he performed a variety of manual labor. He was noted for his humility, simplicity, and compassion for the poor and sick. When he went with alms to the villages, he helped the parish priests in the catechesis of their faithful, instructing the more rustic and less educated. On more than one occasion he seemed to repeat the Miracle of the Loaves and the Fishes, multiplying the bread to feed the hungry poor. If a friary was in short supply and in great need, the Provincial Father sent Hibernón as a beggar, and with this their situation improved. Hibernón was believed to have the gifts of prophecy and of levitation when absorbed in prayer.

He died at the age of sixty-eight in the early hours of 18 April 1602 in the friary of San Roque de Gandía in Valencia, having foretold that exact date of his death in 1598.

== Veneration ==
When word of his death spread, the friary was besieged by throngs seeking a small piece of his clothing or of something he had touched, as a relic. He was initially buried in the conventual Church of San Roque de Gandía, to which pilgrims came seeking his intercession, or in thanksgiving for favors received. His incorrupt remains are now housed in the Murcia Cathedral – though some are in Alcantarilla – after being relocated from Gandia in 1936 due to the Spanish Civil War.

The beatification for the late friar was proposed under Pope Urban VIII in 1624, but as the province was already involved in the cause of Paschal Baylon, no formal process was initiated and thus the cause did not come to fruition during that pontificate. The beatification did later receive formal approval from Pope Pius VI who confirmed the local 'cultus' – or popular devotion – in a decree issued on 22 May 1791.

== See also ==
- Solanus Casey
