= San Pascual, Batangas =

Municipality in Batangas, Philippines

San Pascual Lagnas
- Municipality
- Municipality of San Pascual
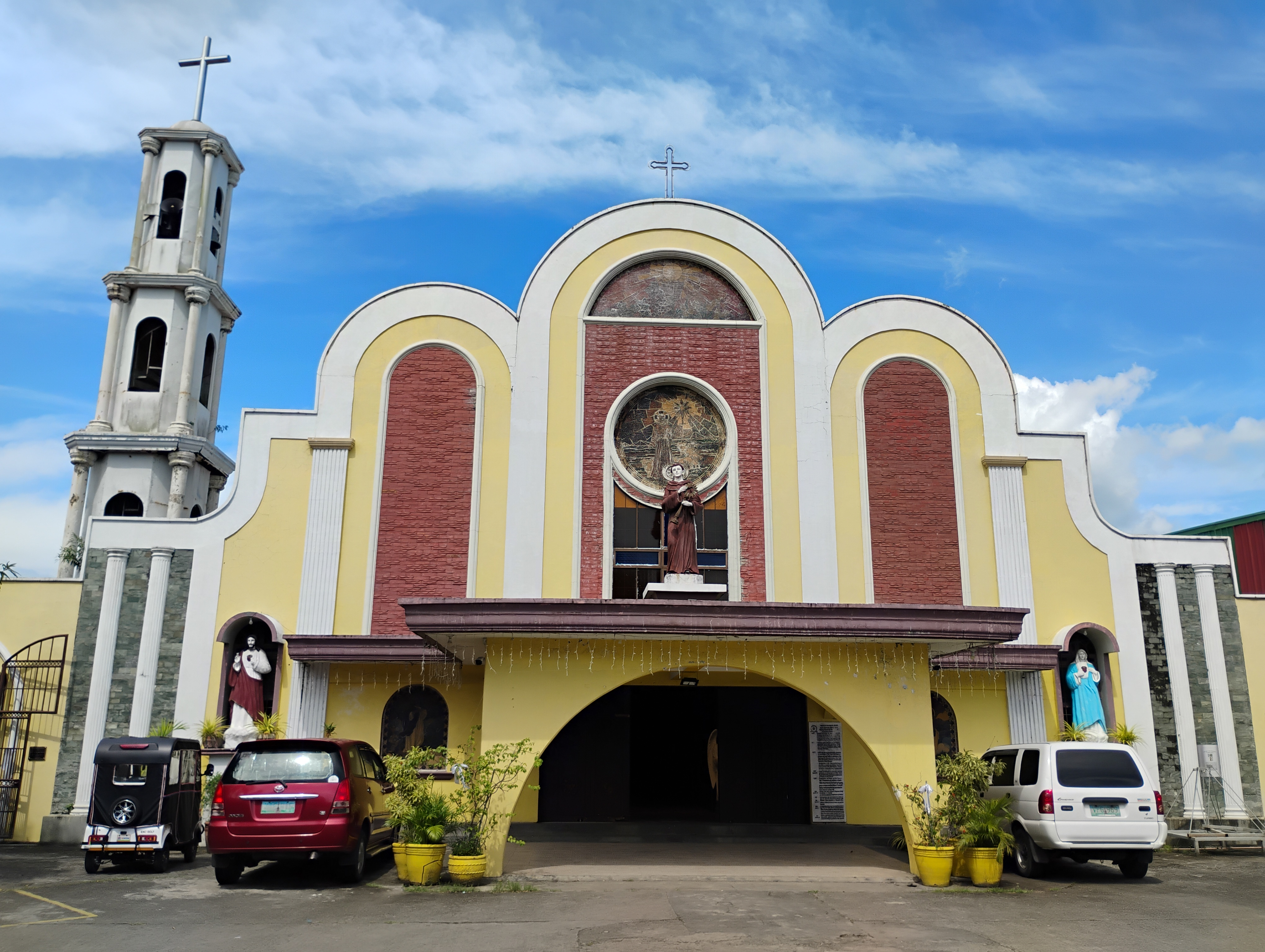
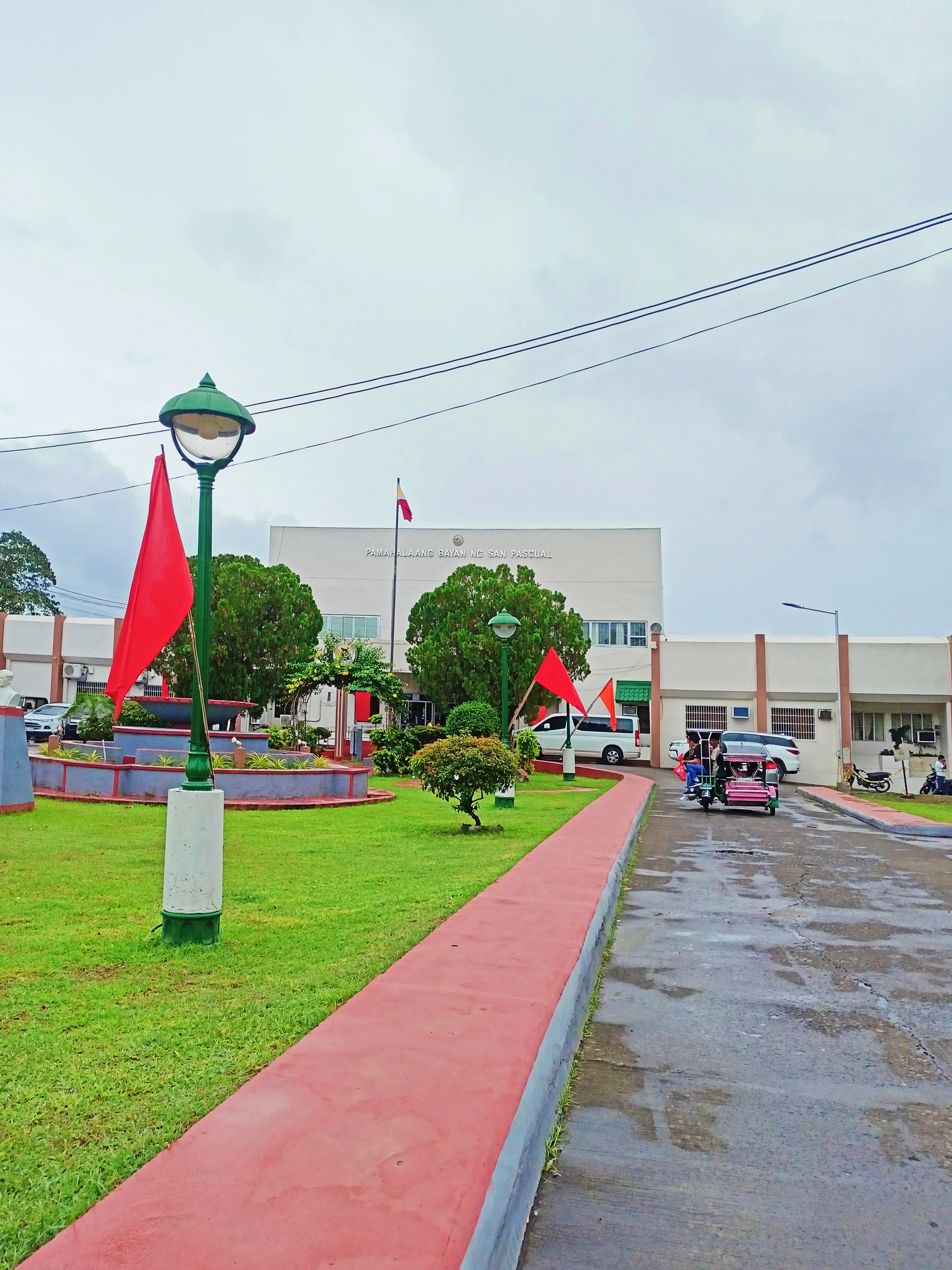
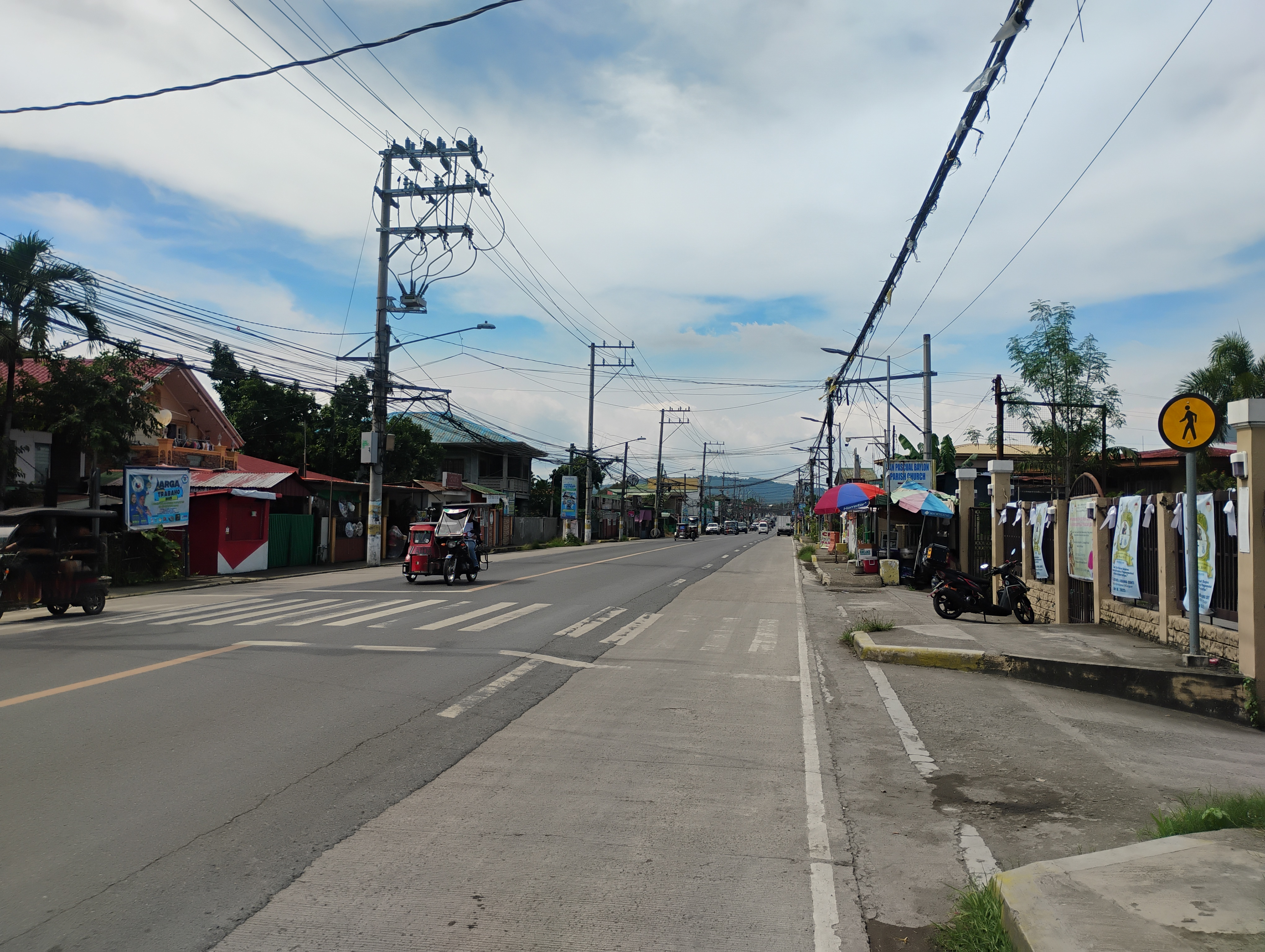
- From top to bottom: San Pascual Baylon Parish Church, San Pascual Municipal Hall, Downtown San Pascual

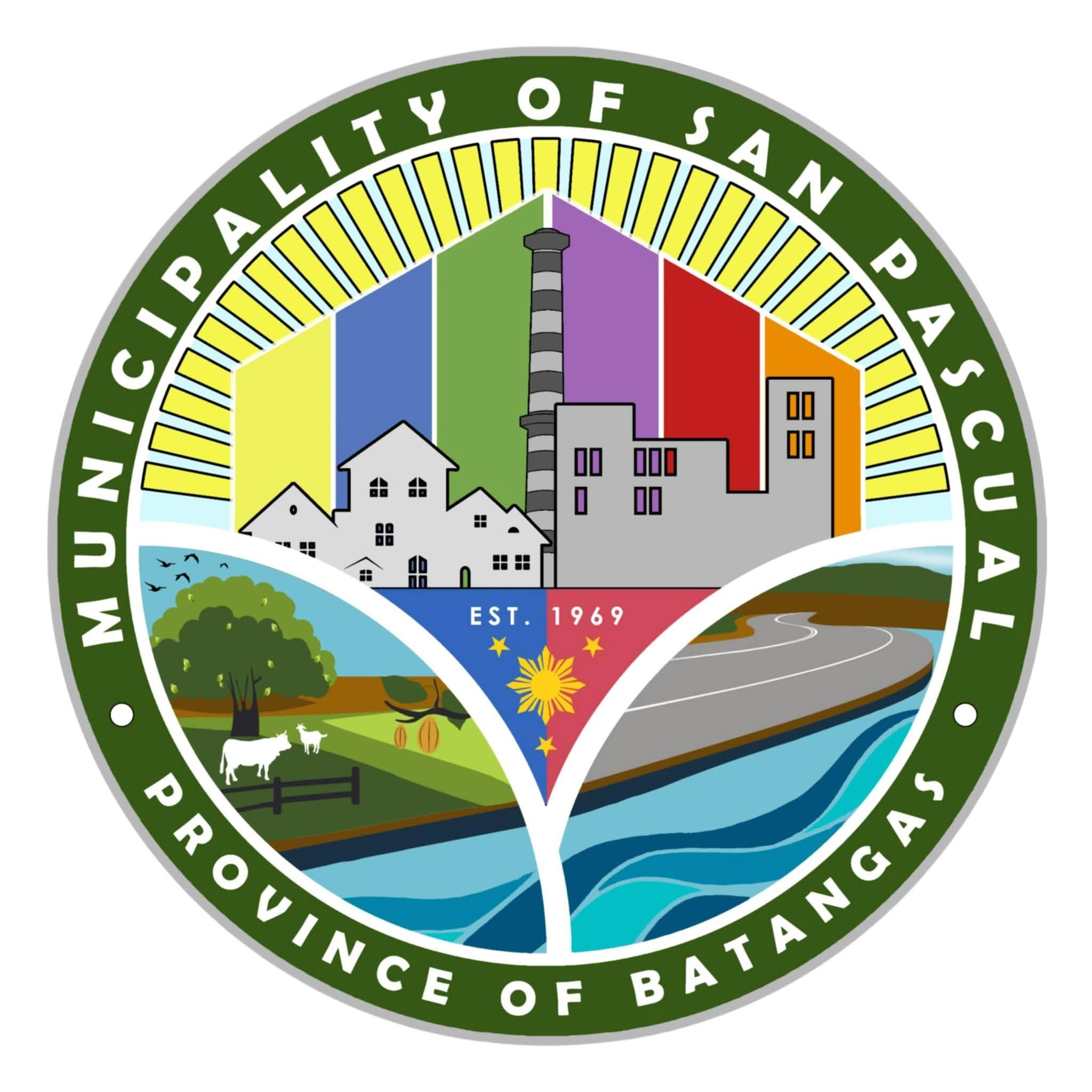
- Seal
- Mottoes: "San Pascual, Bayan Nating Mahal" "San Pascual, Bayang Marangal"
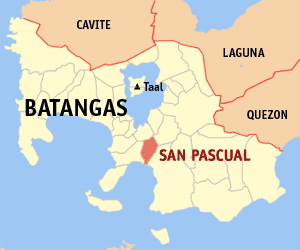
- Map of Batangas with San Pascual highlighted
- Interactive map of San Pascual
- Location within the Philippines
- Coordinates: 13°48′N 121°02′E
- Country: Philippines
- Region: Calabarzon
- Province: Batangas
- District: 2nd district
- Founded: August 4, 1969
- Founder: Leonardo Leoning Mendoza
- Named for: St. Paschal Baylón
- Barangays: 29 (see Barangays)

Government
  - Type: Sangguniang Bayan
  - Mayor: Rosario Anna Victoria D. Conti
  - Vice Mayor: Roumel G. Agula
  - Representative: Gerville R. Luistro
  - Municipal Council: Members: Graziella Niña Joan T. Medrano; Jaime S. Collantes; Hazzel C. Bulangagui; Jann Ralph Cedrick I. Pujante; Crispina B. Caraan Jr.; Dennis D. Cullado; Rowena G. Manalo; Rowena C. Cantos; Rhainne Cshyra M. Dimatatac; Medel D. Medrano
  - Electorate: 44,264 voters (2025)

Area
  - Total: 50.70 km^{2} (19.58 sq mi)
- Elevation: 46 m (151 ft)
- Highest elevation: 155 m (509 ft)
- Lowest elevation: 0 m (0 ft)

Population (2024 census)
  - Total: 69,419
  - Density: 1,369/km^{2} (3,546/sq mi)
  - Households: 17,717

Economy
  - Income class: 1st municipal income class
  - Poverty incidence: 4.12% (2023)
  - Revenue: ₱ 379.1 million (2024)
  - Assets: ₱ 1,090 million (2024)
  - Expenditure: ₱ 151.9 million (2024)
  - Liabilities: ₱ 90.39 million (2024)

Service provider
  - Electricity: Manila Electric Company (Meralco)
- Time zone: UTC+8 (PST)
- ZIP code: 4204
- PSGC: 0401026000
- IDD : area code: +63 (0)43
- Native languages: Tagalog
- Major religions: Christianity: Roman Catholic; Protestantism; Born again; MGCI; Iglesia ni Cristo; Jesus is Lord Church
- Patron saint: St. Paschal Baylón

San Pascual, officially the Municipality of San Pascual (Tagalog: Bayan ng San Pascual), is a municipality in the province of Batangas, Philippines.According to the 2024 census, it has a population of 69,419 people, making it as the 9th most populous municipality in the province.

== History ==
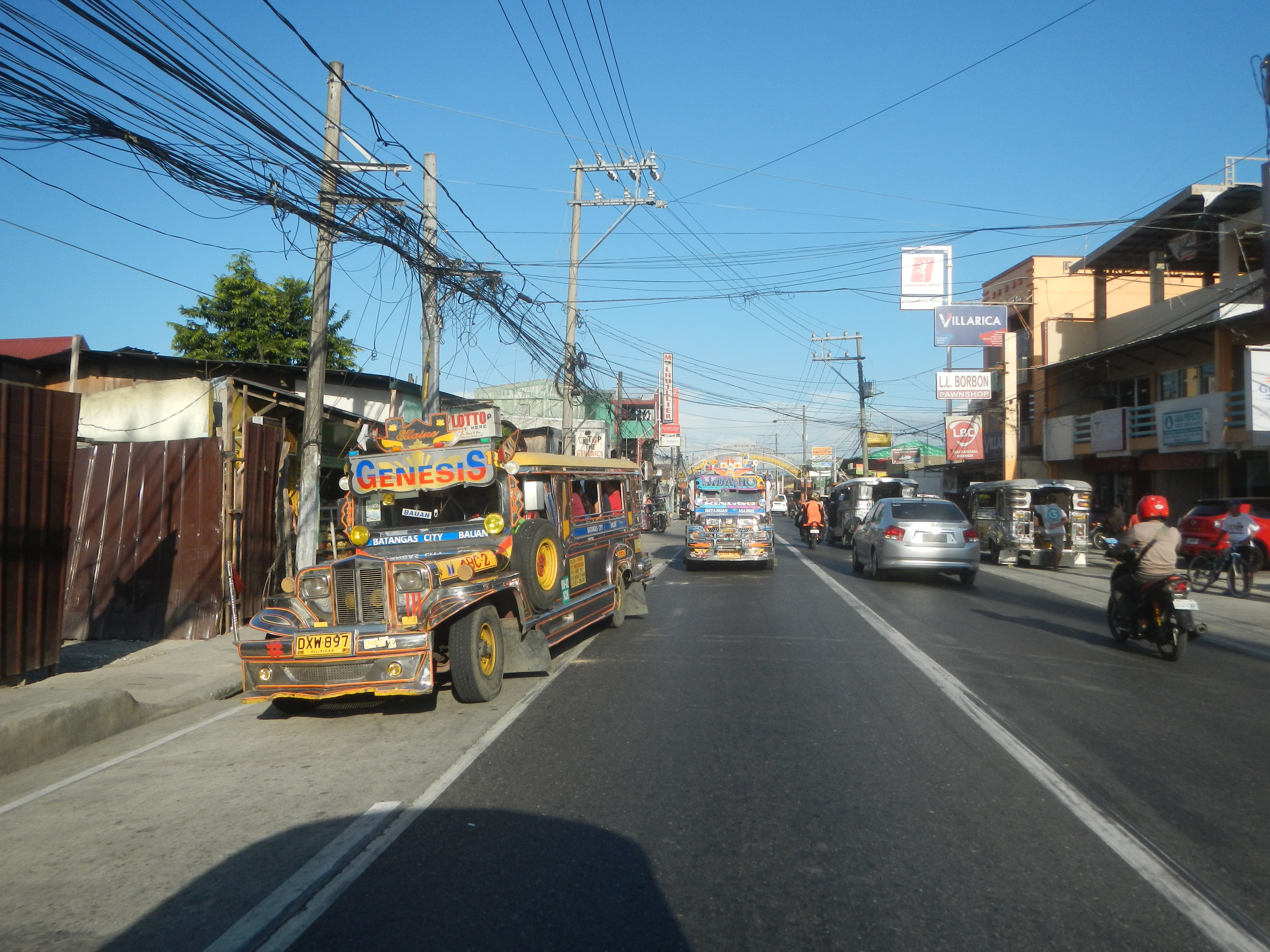
Border between Batangas City and San Pascual.

=== Separation from Bauan ===
Historically, San Pascual was a part of Bauan and was originally referred to as "Lagnas." The name "Lagnas", which refers to the municipality's location physically between the Lagnas and Hagonoy Rivers, is derived from the local dialect and means "river boundaries."

San Pascual became a separate municipality in 1969 by virtue of Republic Act No. 6116. It initially consisted of 25 barrios, all carved out from Bauan, namely: San Pascual, Danglayan, San Antonio, Laurel, Bayanan, San Mateo, Banaba, Natunuan North, Natunuan South, Kaing-in, Santo Niño, Sambat, Palsahingin, Alalum, Santa Elena, Del Pilar, Malaking Pook, Pila, San Mariano, Pook ni Banal, Pook ng Kapitan, Mataas na Lupa, Ilat, Gelerang Cawayan (Gelerang Kawayan), and Resplando.

=== Religious attributions ===
The religious populace and congregation therefore changed the name of the Lagnas neighborhood to San Pascual De Baylon in honor of the Roman Catholic saint. It was thought that naming a location after one of its patron saints would bring luck and a prosperous future. As a result, somewhere around 1959, the San Pascual neighborhood became the Parish of San Pascual de Baylon, with the aforementioned saint serving as its Patron Saint.

== Government ==
=== Local government ===
The municipal mayor is in charge of the municipality and serves as the head of the local government. The vice mayor serves as the mayor's deputy. Regarding the local legislature. The Sangguniang Bayan serves as the municipality's local legislature. The vice mayor serves as its president, and the council is made up of eight "councillors."

=== Representative ===
San Pascual is part of Batangas's 2nd congressional district. Gerville Luistro (Lakas-CMD) is the current representative of the 2nd district.

== Geography ==
San Pascual is located at 13°48′N 121°02′E.

According to the Philippine Statistics Authority, the municipality has a land area of 50.70 square kilometers (19.58 sq mi) constituting 1.63% of the 3,119.75-square-kilometer (1,204.54 sq mi) total area of Batangas.

San Pascual is 5 kilometers (3.1 mi) from Batangas City and 110 kilometers (68 mi) from Manila. The municipality borders Bauan on the west, Alitagtag and San Jose on the north, and Batangas City on the east.

=== Barangays ===
San Pascual is politically subdivided into 29 barangays, as shown in the matrix below. Each barangay consists of puroks and some have sitios.

PSGC	Barangay	Population			±% p.a.	
		2024		2010		
041026001	Alalum	3.1%	2,155	1,986	▴	0.57%
041026002	Antipolo	1.7%	1,176	1,106	▴	0.43%
041026003	Balimbing	2.4%	1,648	522	▴	8.31%
041026004	Banaba	3.8%	2,662	2,440	▴	0.61%
041026005	Bayanan	4.2%	2,939	2,721	▴	0.54%
041026006	Danglayan	1.2%	841	580	▴	2.61%
041026007	Del Pilar	1.1%	759	667	▴	0.90%
041026008	Gelerang Kawayan	2.2%	1,533	1,519	▴	0.06%
041026009	Ilat North	2.2%	1,544	1,416	▴	0.60%
041026010	Ilat South	2.0%	1,363	1,385	▾	−0.11%
041026011	Kaingin	1.6%	1,130	1,022	▴	0.70%
041026012	Laurel	3.0%	2,108	2,045	▴	0.21%
041026013	Malaking Pook	1.1%	780	756	▴	0.22%
041026014	Mataas na Lupa	3.0%	2,092	1,938	▴	0.53%
041026015	Natunuan North	2.2%	1,557	1,474	▴	0.38%
041026016	Natunuan South	1.7%	1,198	1,053	▴	0.90%
041026017	Padre Castillo	1.7%	1,189	960	▴	1.50%
041026018	Palsahingin	1.5%	1,065	980	▴	0.58%
041026019	Pila	1.3%	928	880	▴	0.37%
041026020	Poblacion	14.7%	10,188	9,977	▴	0.15%
041026021	Pook ni Banal	1.9%	1,347	1,223	▴	0.67%
041026022	Pook ni Kapitan	1.3%	927	752	▴	1.46%
041026023	Resplandor	1.7%	1,148	1,058	▴	0.57%
041026024	Sambat	8.9%	6,213	5,633	▴	0.68%
041026025	San Antonio	13.1%	9,096	8,639	▴	0.36%
041026026	San Mariano	3.4%	2,336	2,154	▴	0.56%
041026027	San Mateo	2.4%	1,651	1,201	▴	2.23%
041026028	Santa Elena	0.9%	650	595	▴	0.62%
041026029	Santo Niño	4.6%	3,201	2,916	▴	0.65%
	Total		69,419	59,598	▴	1.06%

=== Climate ===
Climate data for San Pascual, Batangas
Month	Jan	Feb	Mar	Apr	May	Jun	Jul	Aug	Sep	Oct	Nov	Dec	Year
Mean daily maximum °C (°F)	28 (82)	29 (84)	31 (88)	32 (90)	31 (88)	30 (86)	29 (84)	28 (82)	28 (82)	29 (84)	29 (84)	28 (82)	29 (85)
Mean daily minimum °C (°F)	19 (66)	19 (66)	20 (68)	22 (72)	24 (75)	24 (75)	24 (75)	24 (75)	24 (75)	23 (73)	21 (70)	20 (68)	22 (72)
Average precipitation mm (inches)	11 (0.4)	13 (0.5)	14 (0.6)	32 (1.3)	101 (4.0)	142 (5.6)	208 (8.2)	187 (7.4)	175 (6.9)	131 (5.2)	68 (2.7)	39 (1.5)	1,121 (44.3)
Average rainy days	5.2	5.0	7.4	11.5	19.8	23.5	27.0	25.9	25.2	23.2	15.5	8.3	197.5
Source: Meteoblue

== Demographics ==
Population census of San Pascual
Year	Pop.	±% p.a.
1970	19,377	—
1975	21,761	+2.35%
1980	26,221	+3.80%
1990	34,629	+2.82%
1995	40,849	+3.14%
2000	49,041	+4.00%
2007	57,200	+2.15%
2010	59,598	+1.51%
2015	65,424	+1.79%
2020	69,009	+1.13%
2024	69,419	+0.14%
Source: Philippine Statistics Authority

In the 2024 census, San Pascual had a population of 69,419 people. The population density was 1,400 inhabitants per square kilometre (3,600/sq mi).

== Economy ==
Poverty incidence of San Pascual (%)

Source: Philippine Statistics Authority

As one of the towns adjacent to the province's capital, it is a bustling town full of businesses and establishments.

The town is home to an oil refinery, chemical plants and various subdivisions and housing projects, as well as other industrial and commercial establishments.

== Hospitals ==
- Saint Pascal De Baylon Hospital
- San Antonio Life Care Hospital

== Education ==
The San Pascual Schools District Office governs all educational institutions within the municipality. It oversees the management and operations of all private and public, from primary to secondary schools.

There are numerous elementary and high schools, offering primary and secondary education in the town of San Pascual. The most known high school in the municipality is the San Pascual National High School.

=== Primary and elementary school ===
- Alalum Elementary School
- Banaba Elementary School
- Bayanan Elementary School
- Gardner School Of Multiple Intelligences
- Gelerang Kawayan Elementary School
- Gratia De Regina School
- Ilat Elementary School
- Kaingin Elementary School
- Khrisholm Hill Christian Academy
- Laurel Elementary School
- Malakimpook Elementary School
- Mataas Na Lupa - Palsahingin Elementary School
- Natunuan North Elementary School
- Natunuan South Elementary School
- Padre Castillo Elementary School
- Pook Ng Kapitan Elementary School
- Pook Ni Banal Elementary School
- Resplandor Elementary School
- Sambat Elementary School
- San Antonio Elementary School
- San Mariano Elementary School
- San Pascual Central School
- Sto. Niño Elementary School

=== Secondary schools ===
- Alalum National High School
- Batangas High School for Culture and Arts
- Bayanan National High School
- Francisco G. Perez Memorial National High School
- Ilat National High School
- Malaking Pook National High School
- San Pascual National High School
- San Pascual Senior High School 1
- San Pascual Senior High School 2

== Gallery ==
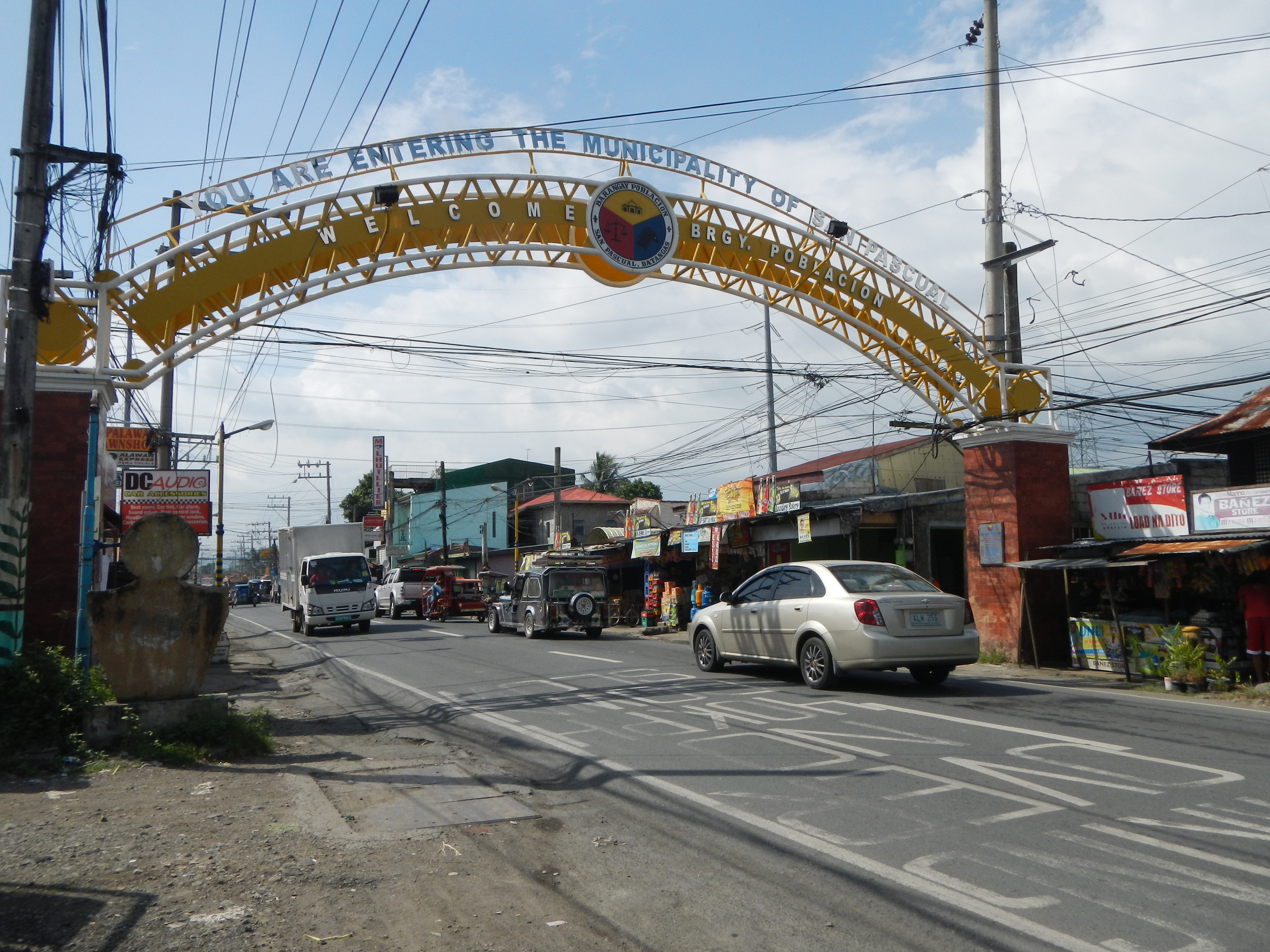
Welcome arch

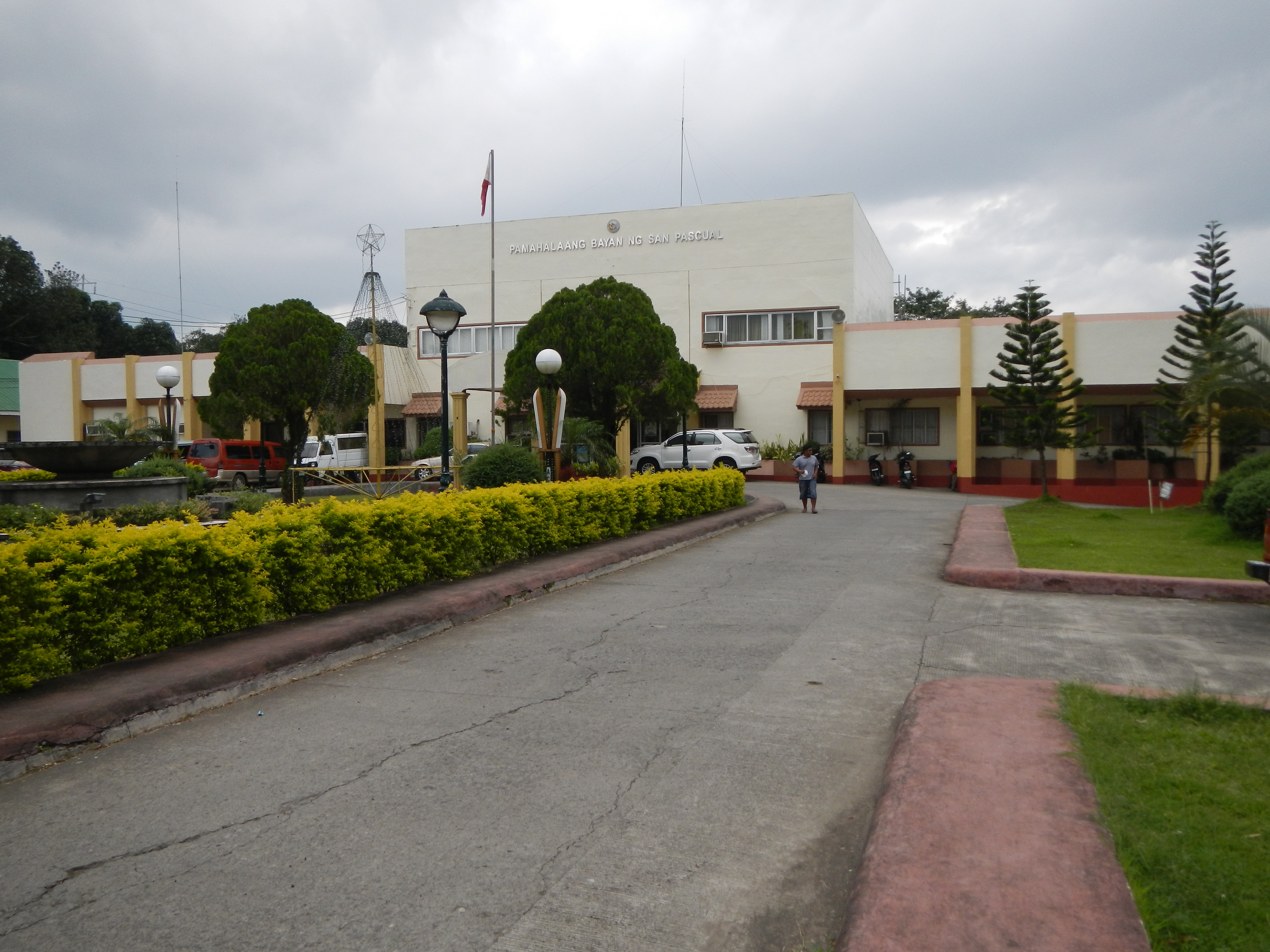
Municipal hall

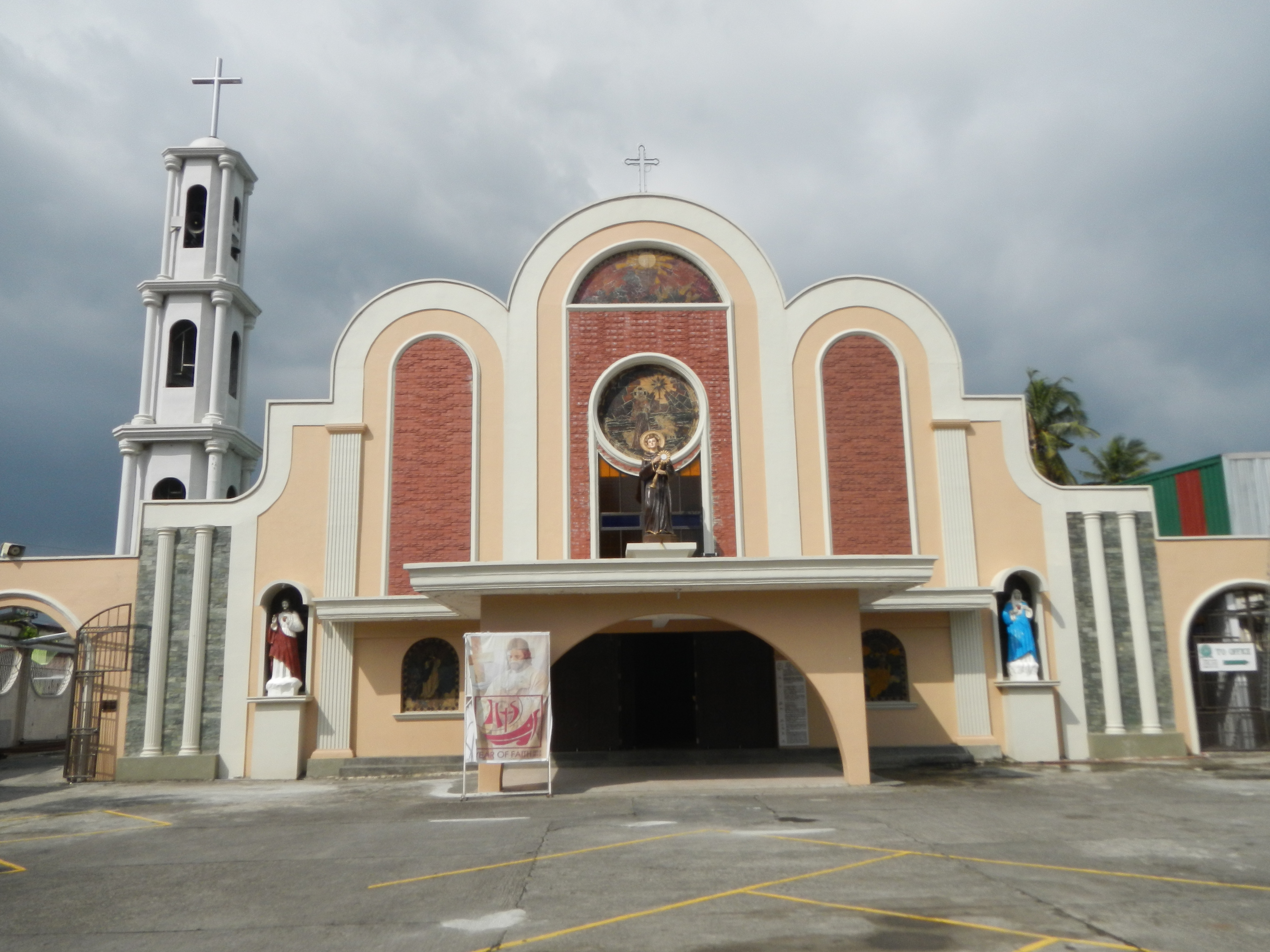
San Pascual Baylon Parish Church

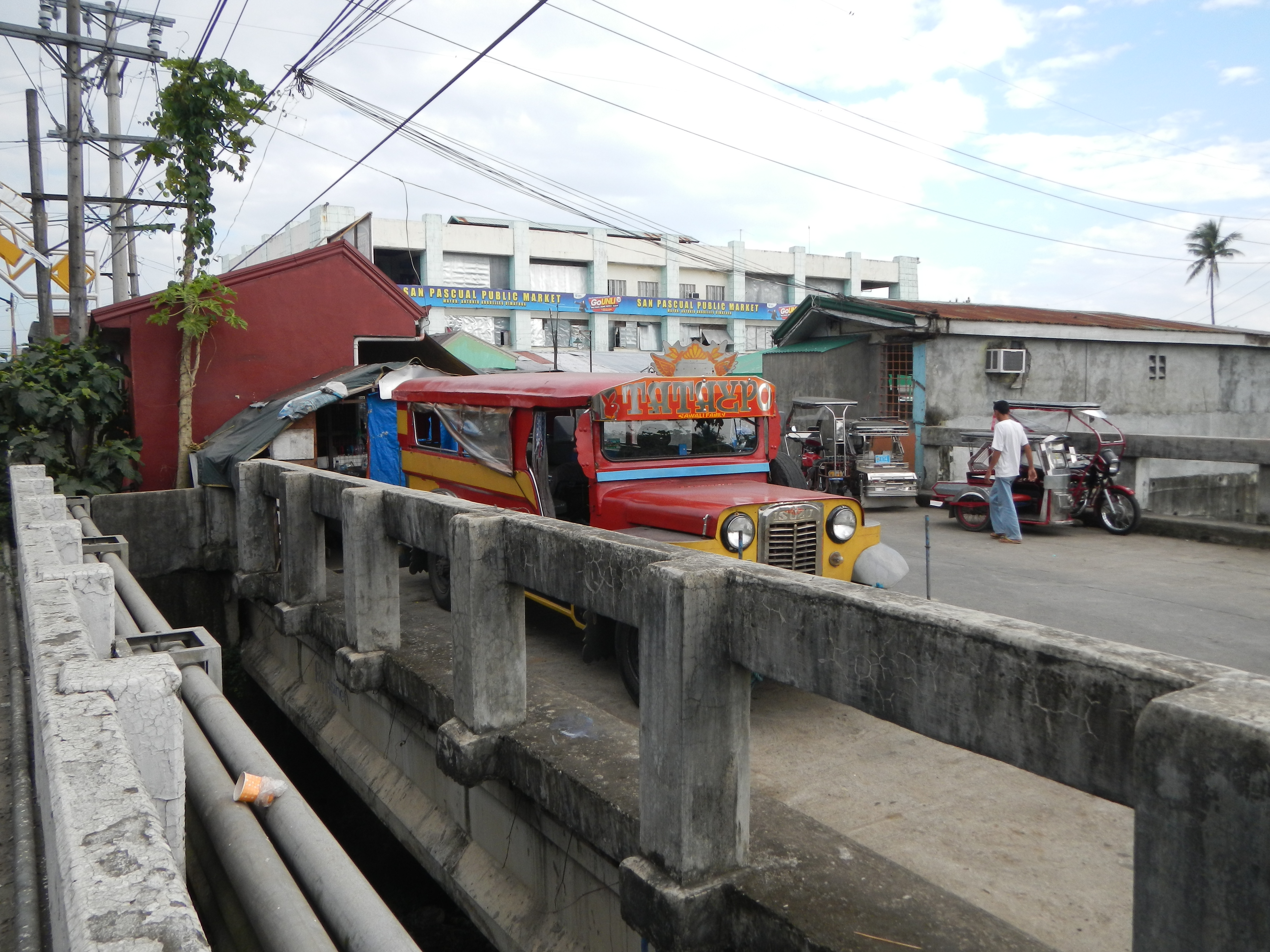
Public Market

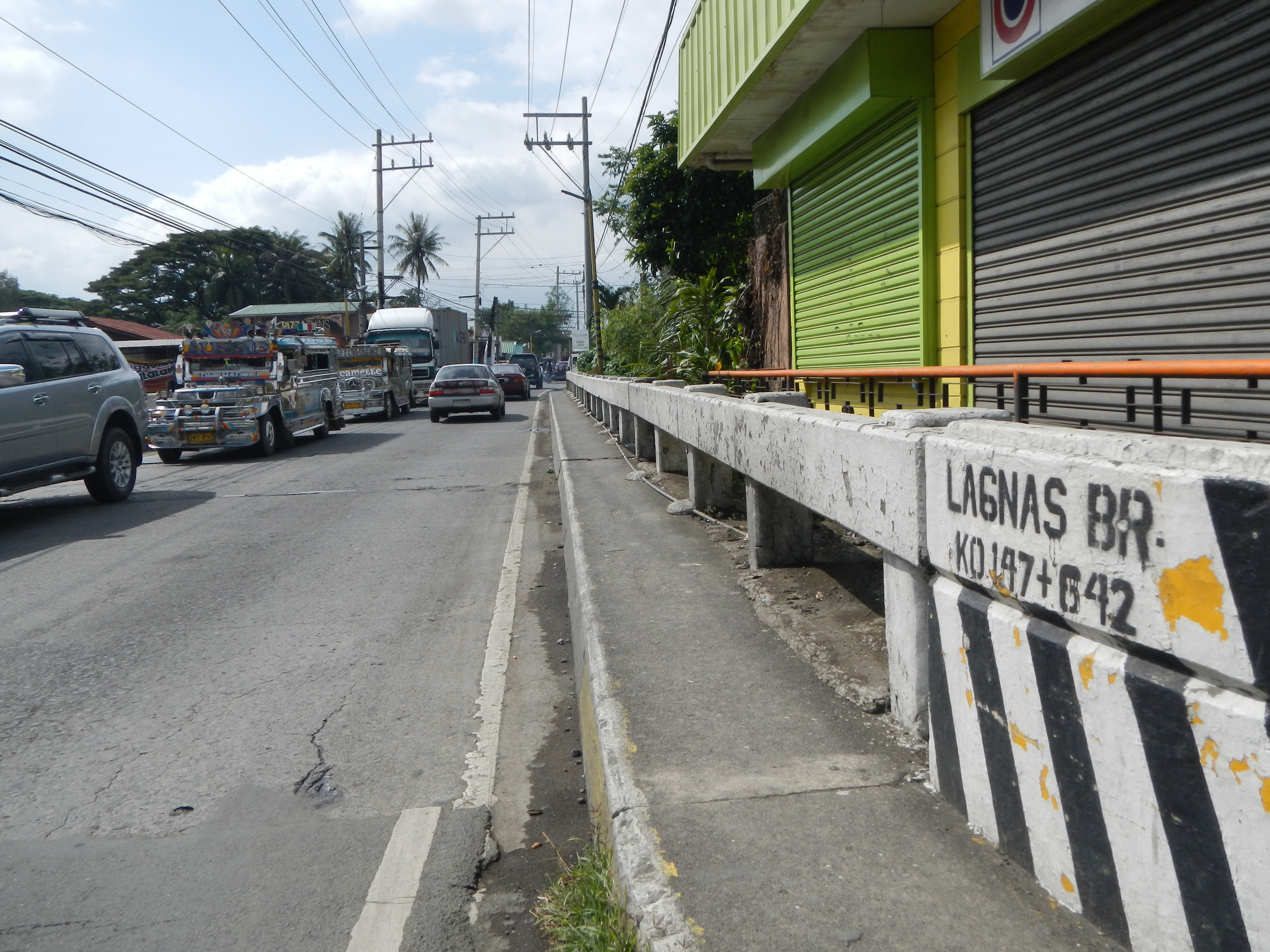
Lagnas Bridge

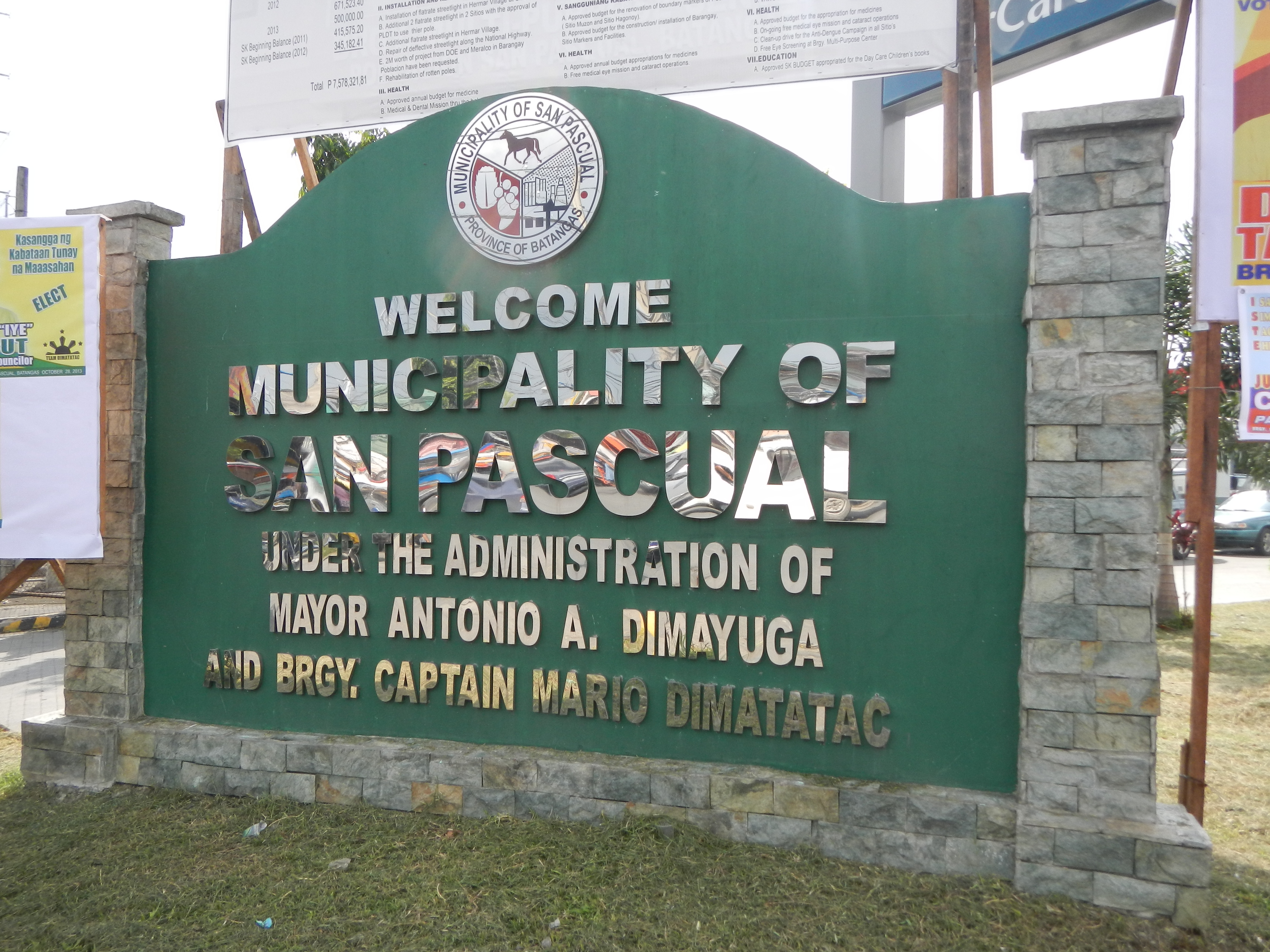
Welcome sign

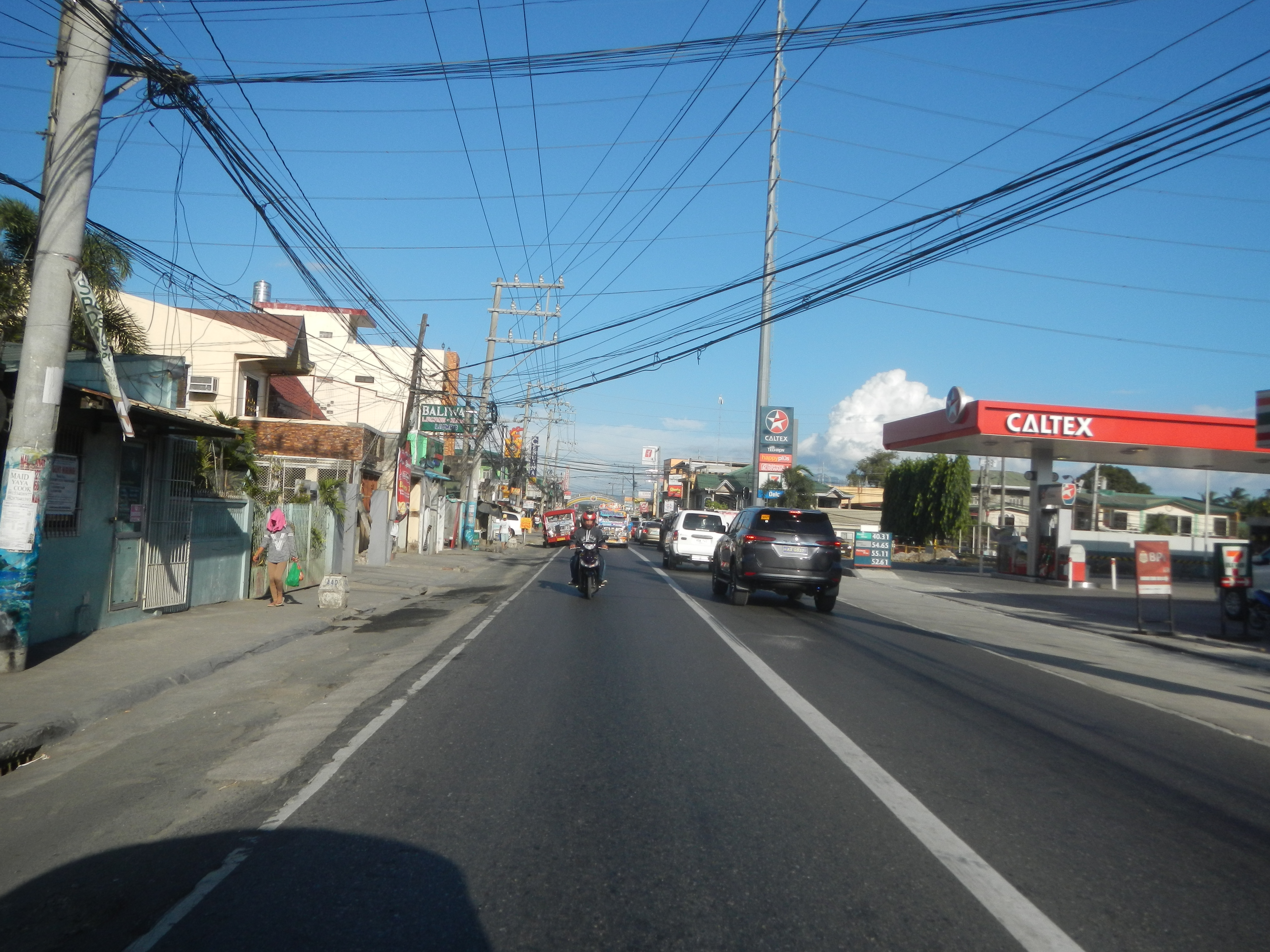
National road

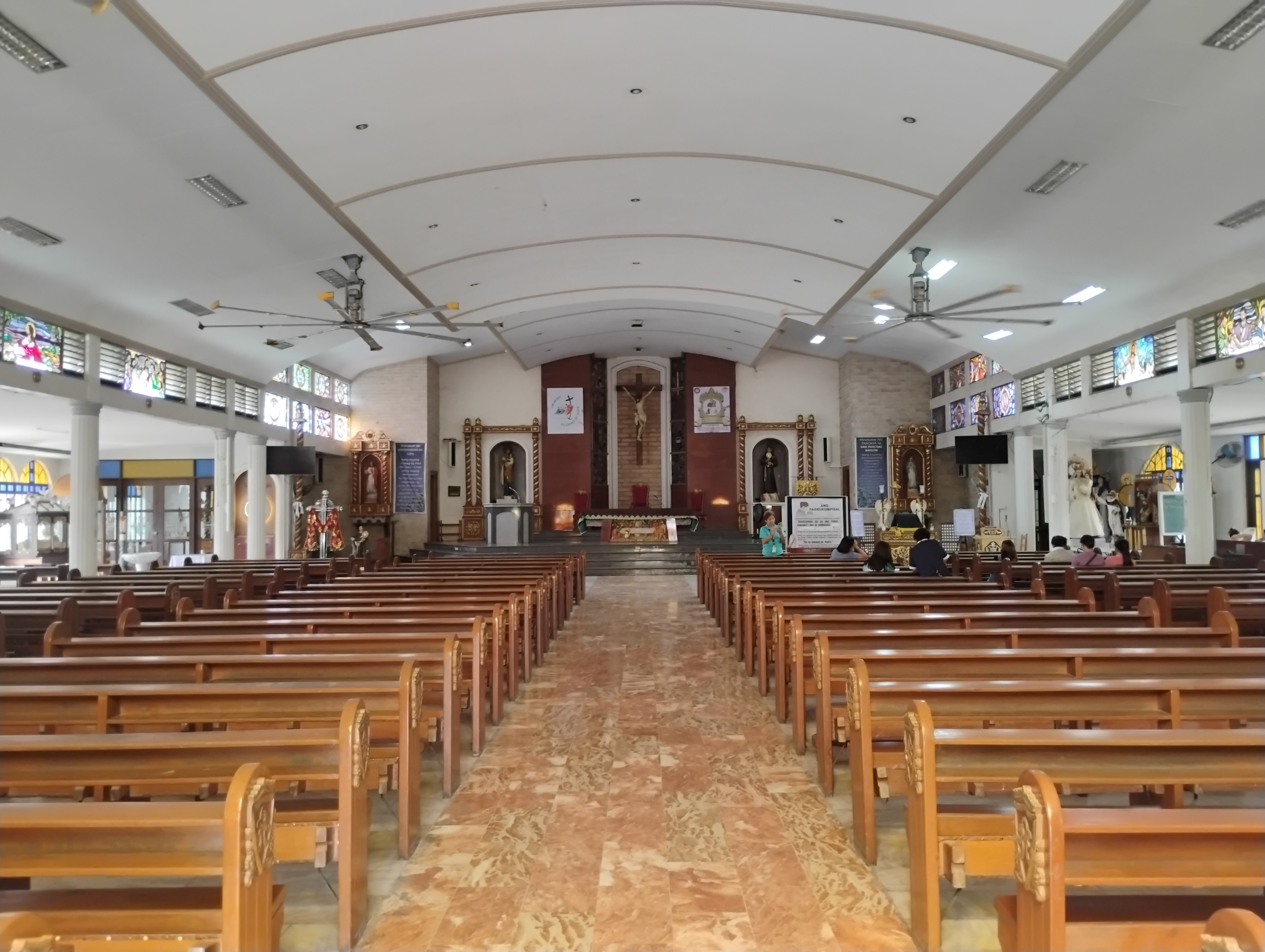
Interior of San Pascual Baylon Parish Church
