= Vila-real =

Town in Valencian Community, Spain

Vila-real Villarreal
- Town and municipality
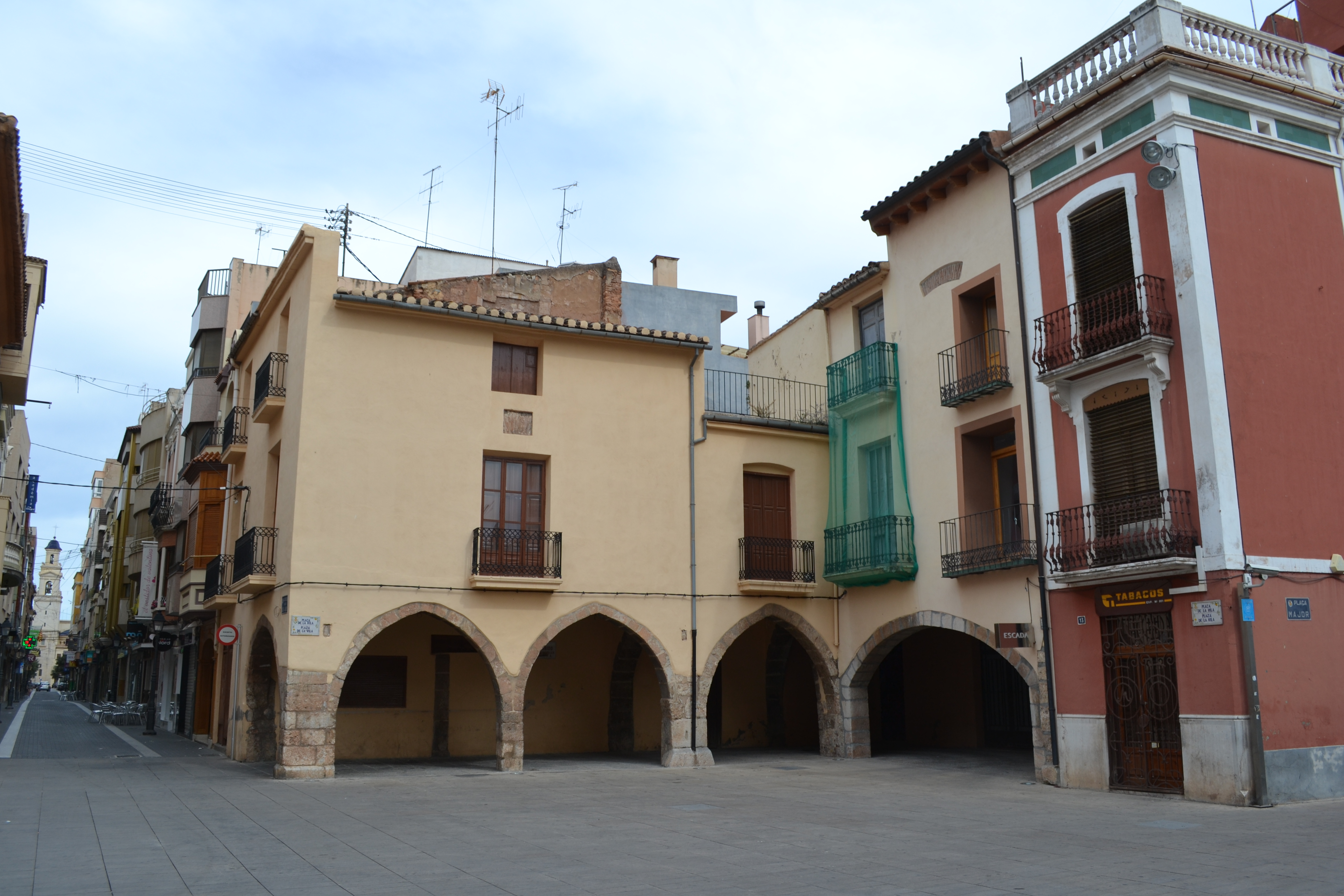
- Vila-real, Vila Square and Sant Jaume Street

- Flag Coat of arms
- Location of Vila-real
- Location within Province of Castellón Location within Valencian Community Location within Spain
- Coordinates: 39°56′16″N 0°6′5″W
- Country: Spain
- Autonomous community: Valencian Community
- Province: Castellón
- Comarca: Plana Baixa
- Judicial district: Vila-real
- Founded: 20 February 1274

Government
  - Type: Mayor-council government
  - Body: Ajuntament de Vila-real
  - Mayor: José Benlloch (PSPV)

Area
  - Total: 55.1 km^{2} (21.3 sq mi)
- Elevation: 42 m (138 ft)

Population (2025-01-01)
  - Total: 53,623
  - Density: 973/km^{2} (2,520/sq mi)
- Demonyms: vila-realenc,-a (Val.) villarrealense (Sp.)
- Official language(s): Valencian; Spanish
- Linguistic area: Valencian
- Time zone: UTC+1 (CET)
  - Summer (DST): UTC+2 (CEST)
- Postal code: 12540
- Dialing code: +34 96
- Website: Official website

Vila-real, (Note: Pronunciation of Vila-real (official): Valencian: [ˈvila reˈal]) also known in Spanish as Villarreal, (Note: Pronunciation of Villarreal: Spanish: [ˌbiʎareˈal]) is a town and municipality in the province of Castellón which is part of the Valencian Community in the east of Spain.

The town is located at 42 m above sea level, 7 km to the south of the province's capital, Castellón de la Plana. Vila-real is separated from Castellón by the Millars River. It has 51,367 inhabitants (2010 data), most of them living in the urban area that covers about 10.7% of its comarca's 55.4 km^{2} surface. Ranked by population, it is the second-largest city in the province (after the capital), and fifteenth in the Valencian Community.

The town was founded with royal status by King James I of Aragon in 1274 during his campaign to regain Muslim territory in present-day Valencia during the Reconquista. It later became an agricultural centre for orange cultivation, and more recently a centre for the ceramics industry.

The city is the birthplace of Francisco de Asís Tárrega y Eixea (1852–1909) who was a Spanish composer and classical guitarist of the Romantic period. He is also the composer of Gran Vals, an excerpt of which was used in a popular Nokia ringtone. In modern times Vila-real is well known for its football club that bears the city's name, a club that, in spite of the city's small size, has won the Europa League, reached the semi-finals of the Champions League (twice) and has since finished amongst the top clubs in Spain on several occasions.

== Etymology ==
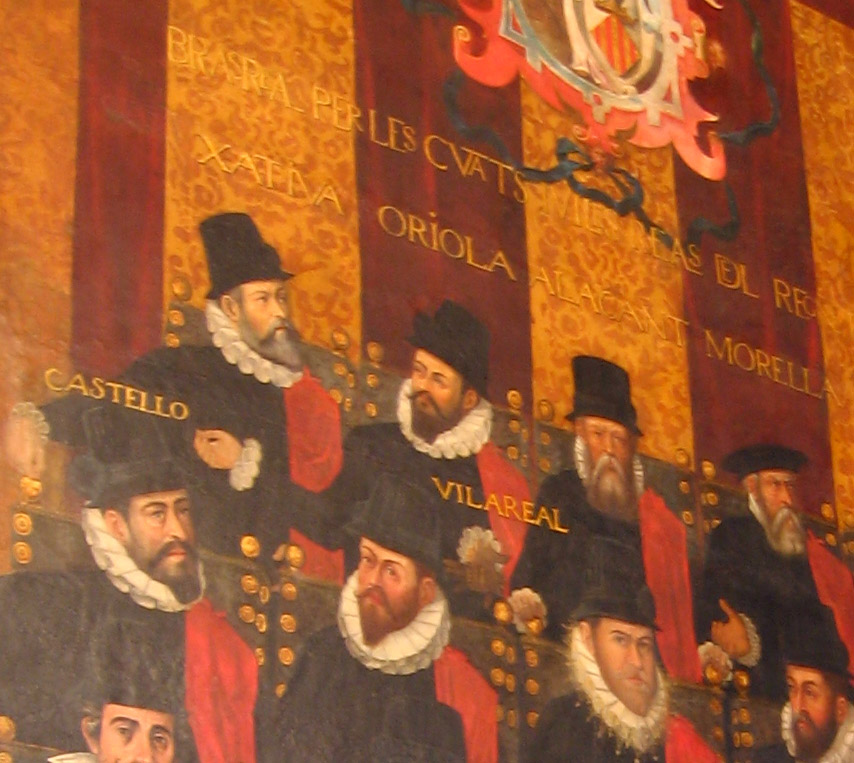
The city's name, Vilareal, adorns its representative in a tapestry of the 1592 Valencian Parliament.

Both the Valencian Vila-real and Castilian Spanish Villarreal are cognates meaning 'Royal Village', due to the city's foundation by King James I of Aragon. Throughout the Middle Ages, as were most European settlements, it was officially known by its Latinised name Villae Regalis. A 1592 tapestry of the Valencian Parliament shows the city's representative with the old Valencian name Vilareal. It was in the late 18th century, as Spain became more centralised, that the Castilian name took over. The city was renamed in 1939, after the Spanish Civil War, as Villarreal de los Infantes (Royal Town of the Infantes), to avoid confusion with other Spanish localities with the same name. It is sometimes still referred to under this extended version.

On 27 February 2006, the municipal corporation voted the Valencian name to become the exclusive official name for the municipality. The agreement was thus published in the Boletín Oficial del Estado in January 2007, and the dual official name Vila-real/Villarreal removed.

Inhabitants of the city are known as vila-realencs (male) or vila-realenques (female) in Valencian, and villarrealenses in Spanish.

== History ==
Vila-real was founded on 20 February 1274 by King James I of Aragon (hence its royal status), to strengthen his reconquest of Eastern Spain from the Moors. It was placed strategically on the ancient Via Augusta 65 km north from Valencia, and in the outskirts of the then-Muslim stronghold of Borriana. It was founded with royal status, with representation in the Valencian Parliament and Delegation of the Kingdom, and had the privilege of using the royal standard as its ensign. Vila-real was part of the royal sector of the Valencian Parliament and had an active say in its affairs.

The original town was surrounded by walls, but expanded outside these limits beginning in the 14th century due to an increase in population. The demographic and economic imbalances which characterise the 15th century carried on into the beginning of the 16th with constant conflicts between the Christian population and the Mudéjars (Muslims who still lived in Christian-majority Spain) who lived in the area.

During the 16th century, productive farm land was extended and enhanced by drilling wells to obtain water and convert dry land into irrigated fields, making it possible to begin commercial agriculture in the 17th century. After the city's disastrous participation in the War of the Spanish Succession, in the second half of the 18th century, the first industries were established, mainly for textiles. Also during that time, the city became involved in various revolts and wars which changed Spain's political make-up.

In the 19th century, the cultivation and trade of oranges was introduced, which gave the town great economic progress, led both by businessmen and by farmers' associations or "cooperatives". After the Spanish Civil War (1936–1939), the earnings obtained from the orange trade allowed several entrepreneurs to build ceramic tile factories as a way to diversify their industries. Ceramics has continued to expand up to the present day, and is now Vila-real's main economic activity.

== Main sights ==
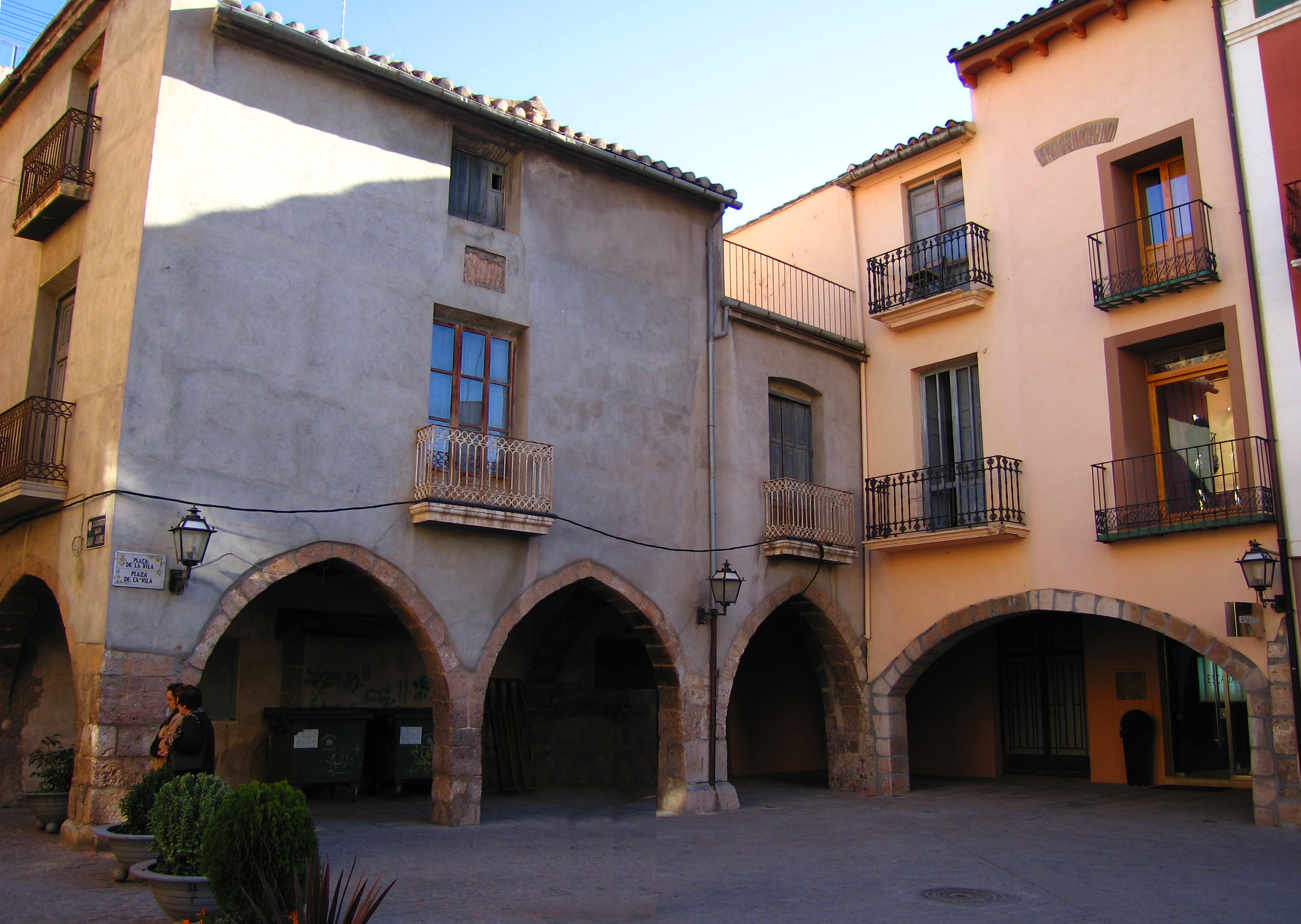
Main square

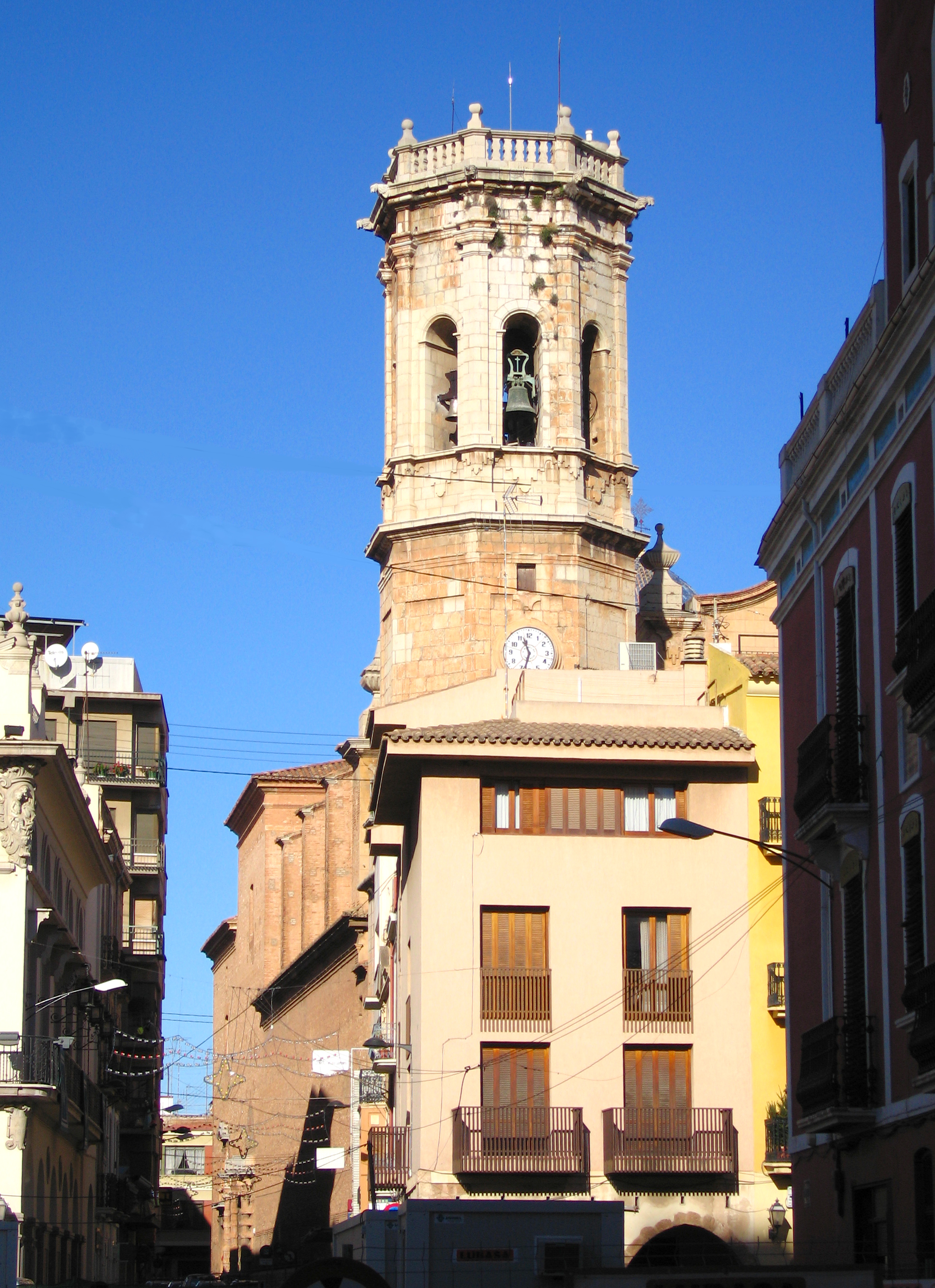
The belfry of Sant Jaume Church

Sights in the town include:

- Basílica de Sant Pasqual (Saint Paschal's Basilica), from the 20th century (the former building was destroyed during the Spanish Civil War).
- Església de Sant Jaume (Saint James's Church), from the 18th century.
- Plaça Major (Main Square), a square surrounded by several porticoed houses built in different periods.
- The City Museum "Casa de Polo"
- Chapel and park of Mare de Déu de Gràcia (Our Lady of Grace).
- Monument of Francisco Tárrega

== Economy ==
Vila-real's economy has evolved since the days of cultivation and trade of oranges in the last century to the manufacturing of ceramic tiles, which today is its most important source of income.

It hosts 4 of Spain's 500 largest businesses, all of which trade in the ceramic tile industry. Other industries in the city include financial services, bricks and other clay products, and basic metals.

== Sport ==
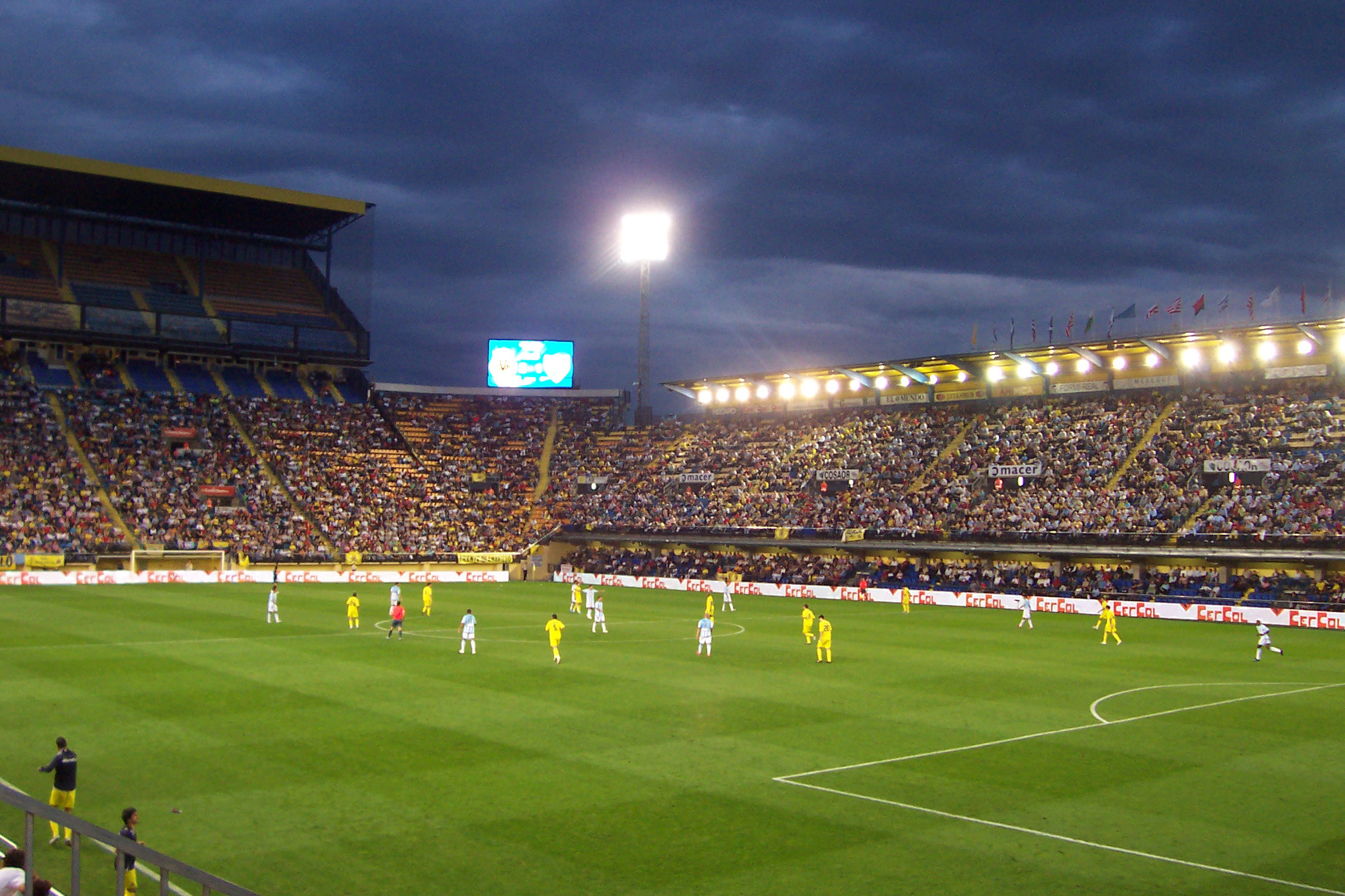
Villarreal CF playing at the Estadio de la Cerámica

The town is home to Villarreal CF, a football club in La Liga, Spain's highest tier of football. Founded in 1923, the club reached the national divisions in 1956 and the top-tier in 1998. During a successful spell in La Liga, the side were League runners-up in the 2007–08 season. They were UEFA Champions League semi-finalists in 2006 and again in 2022 and they won their first European trophy by winning the Europa League final in 2021. Villarreal have also been semi-finalists in 2004, 2011 and 2016. The team play at the Estadio de la Cerámica which, with a 25,000-seat capacity, could fit half of the population of the town.

Villarreal CF full-back Joan Capdevila played in the Spain national squad that won the 2010 FIFA World Cup in South Africa. Capdevila and Villarreal teammate Marcos Senna played in the Spain national squad that won UEFA Euro 2008.
