= Flag of Batangas =

Batangas
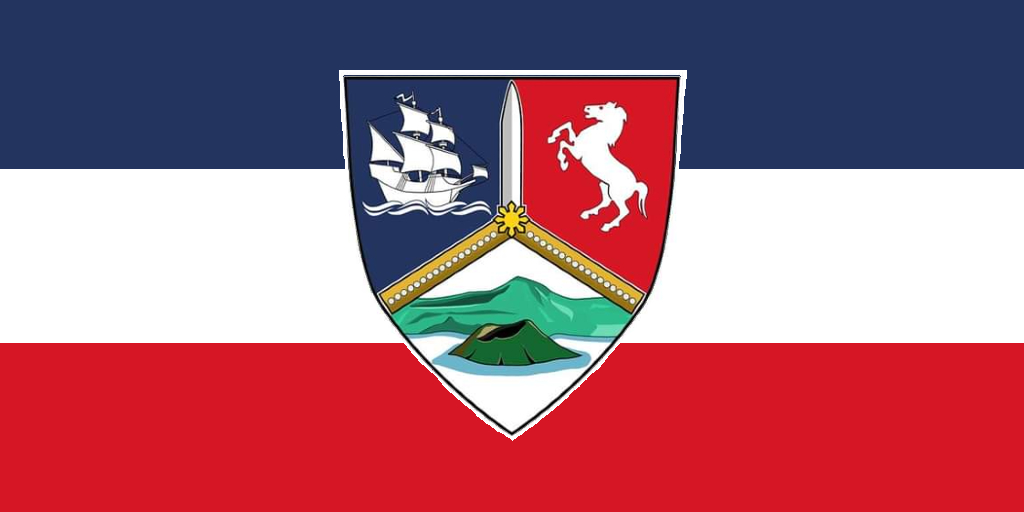
- Use: State flag
- Proportion: 1:2
- Adopted: 2023
- Use: State flag
- Proportion: 1:2
- Adopted: 2009
- Relinquished: 2023
- Use: State flag
- Proportion: 1:2
- Adopted: 198??
- Relinquished: 2009
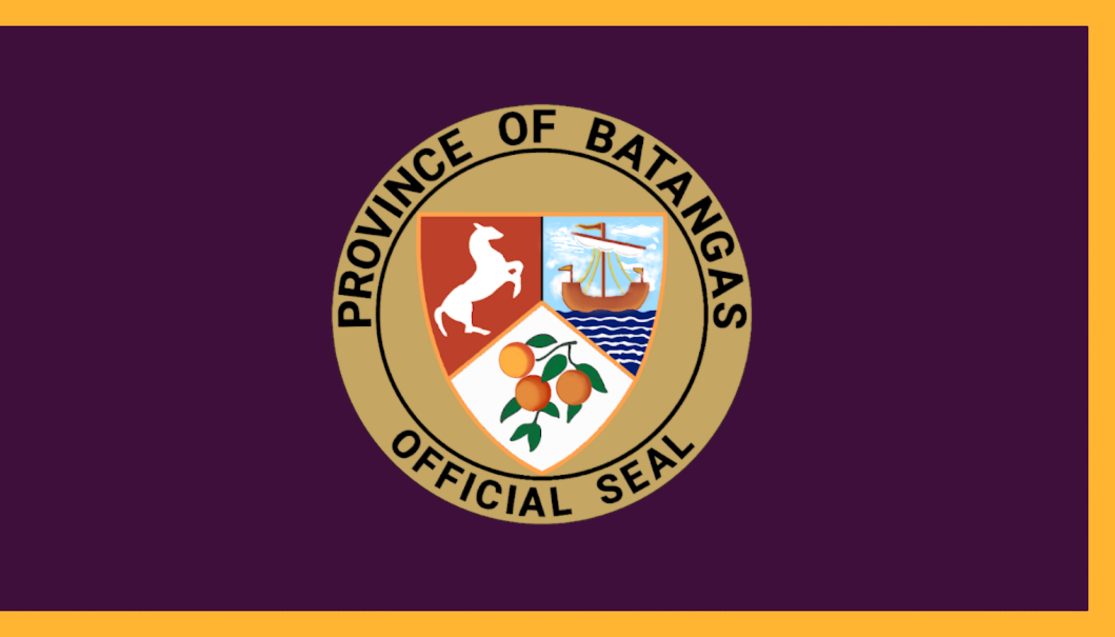
- Use: State flag
- Proportion: 1:2

The flag of Batangas is the provincial flag of Batangas, Philippines. It is a horizontal triband of blue, white, and red — the main colors of the Philippine flag — with the escutcheon taken from the provincial seal in the center.

== Symbolism ==
Nearly similar to the 2009 flag redesign, the current iteration of the flag is a horizontal triband of blue, white, and red.

The escutcheon (shield) from the provincial seal that was adopted in 2022 is placed in the flag's center.

Color bands
Color		Symbolizes
Blue		peace, truth, and justice
White		freedom, equality, and camaraderie
Red		patriotism and valor
Escutcheon (central element)
Section	Element	Symbolizes
Three-part divider	Balisong	Bravery and valor of Batangas' people: 34 bezants which ornate the handle of the balisong – the five cities and 29 municipalities of the province; Sun – honors the representation of the province as one of the rays of the Philippine flag
Blue	Galleon	vast waters of the province. It also symbolizes the province as a sea transportation hub, especially through Batangas International Port, the second most busiest seaport in the country next to Manila's.
Blue	Eight waves	Verde Island Passage, as well as the other bays of the province namely: Balayan, Talim, Nasugbu, Pagapas, Tayabas, Sigayan, and Coloconto.
Red	Horse	Represents independence, freedom, greatness, stability, bravery, victory, heroism, and competition
White	Volcano	Emphasis on the Taal Volcano as a geographical landmark of the province.

== History ==
=== Pre-2009 flag design ===
The previous flag of Batangas was predominantly white with a narrow blue stripe at the bottom. This stripe was surmounted by the words "BATANGAS PROVINCE" and a gold-colored bull, courant toward the provincial seal located on the upper part of the fly. This flag was replaced due to its resemblance to the flag of the U.S. state of California.

=== Vilma Santos-Recto flag design ===
This flag design was a horizontal triband of blue, white, and red — the main colors of the Philippine flag — with the provincial seal in the center. The flag design was adopted from 2009 to 2023 and was known as the "Vilma Santos-Recto Administration Provincial Flag" due to being adopted during Governor Vilma Santos-Recto's term.

Other proposals considered in replacing the old flag involved: incorporating the image of a revered Katipunan figure and Batangas native Apolinario Mabini; incorporating a yellow triangle at the hoist; and restoring the old flag format of a plain purple flag with the updated provincial seal in the center.

The flag has a width-to-length proportion of 1:2. In the unveiling ceremony for the flag, the sample construction sheet provides a width of 3 ft (0.91 m) and a length of 6 ft (1.8 m). The top (blue) and bottom (red) stripes have widths of 7 in (18 cm) each, while the middle (white) stripe is given a width of 22 in (56 cm). The provincial seal is given diameter of 20.5 in (52 cm).

=== 2023 flag redesign ===
The 2023 flag redesign was unveiled and adopted on December 8, 2023, on the occasion of the province's 442nd founding anniversary under the administration of Governor Hermilando Mandanas. It is a blue, white, and red tricolor of equal height with the shield of the province's seal in the middle.
