= Gliceria Marella de Villavicencio =

Filipino revolutionary

Gliceria Marella Villavicencio
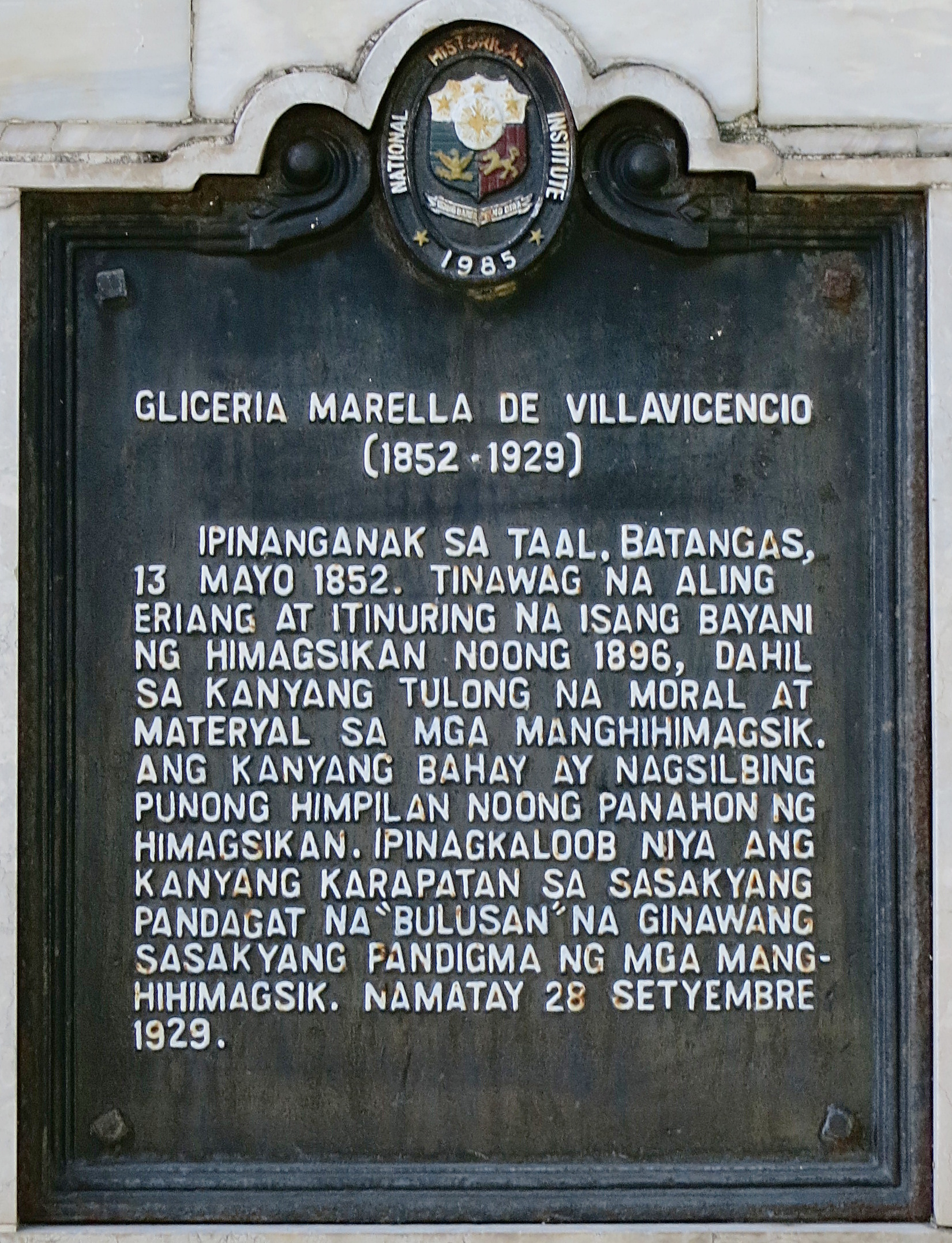
- Historical Maker of Gliceria Marella De Villavicencio in Taal, Batangas.
- Born: Gliceria Legaspi Marella; May 13, 1852; Taal, Batangas, Captaincy General of the Philippines
- Died: September 28, 1929 (aged 77); United States Military Government of the Philippine Islands, U.S.
- Resting place: La Loma Cemetery
- Spouse: Eulalio Villavicencio
- Children: 9

Doña Gliceria Legaspi Marella de Villavicencio (May 15, 1852 – September 28, 1929), also known as Aling Eralian, is acknowledged as one of the famous Filipinos who gave her own wealth, time, knowledge and effort to help the Revolutionaries during the Philippine Revolution.

She is also recognized as a heroine of the Revolution, an ardent sympathizer and supporter of the Filipino struggle for freedom from colonial rule.

During the proclamation of the Philippine Independence on June 12, 1898, Gliceria Marella Villavicencio was given the name "godmother of the revolutionary forces".

== Biography ==
Gliceria Marella Villavicencio was born on May 13, 1852, in Taal, Batangas. She was the third of seven children and the daughter of Vicente Marella and Gertrudis Legaspi. They were a wealthy family. At the age of 12 she attended the Santa Catalina College in Intramuros. When Gliceria's elder sister died, she had to take on the responsibility of managing the family estate.

In October 1871, Gliceria married Eulalio Villavicencio, a wealthy ship owner, who also came from a rich family. Together, Eulalio and Gliceria contributed a large portion of their fortune and effort to support the Philippine Revolution. Casa villavicencio, a house on the hill top, was gifted to her as a wedding gift by her husband. The house is used as a place for refuge and as a secret meeting site for revolutionary leaders. When the Spaniards found out about the couples revolutionary activities, their house was frequently searched by the Guardia Civil, where later Eulalio was arrested on charges of sedition and inciting rebellion. Gliceria pleaded in Manila for her husband's release. Gliceria was given the offer from the Spaniards of having her husband released from prison in exchange for any secrets. However, she refused the offer despite her love for her husband. Eulalio was later finally released in 1898, but died after 3 months due to his degraded health in February 1898. The death of her husband had inflamed her passion for supporting the revolution against the Spaniards.

Gliceria Marella Villavicencio used much of her wealth to extend material aid to the insurrectos (Note: Filipino nationalists who fought against the Spanish and then against the United States in the Philippine Insurrection of 1899-1902.). Out of the many she had given, the most notable was the donation of her ship, the SS Bulusan, which was used in transporting Filipino soldiers, armaments, ammunition, and food supplies for the maintenance of the revolutionary forces. It was the first warship made available to the revolutionaries.

She was a founder of the Batallon Maluya, gave financial and moral support to the revolutionaries and continually provided food, clothing and ammunition to the soldiers. Her house became the secret meeting place of revolutionary leaders, including Andres Bonifacio, General Miguel Malvar and General Marasigan.

Gliceria Marella Villavicencio died on September 25, 1929. She had six children.

== See also ==
- List of historical markers in the Philippines
- Philippine Navy
- Taal, Batangas
- Philippine Revolution
