= Batangas II Electric Cooperative =

Electric cooperative in the Philippines

Batangas II Electric Cooperative (BATELEC II)
- Type: Electric cooperative
- Industry: Electric power distribution
- Headquarters: Batangas, Philippines
- Area served: Eastern Batangas (2 cities, 15 municipalities)

Batangas II Electric Cooperative, Inc., commonly known as BATELEC II, is an electric cooperative that distributes power to the province of Batangas in the Philippines. It serves the eastern part of the province, covering two cities and 15 municipalities. As of 2019, it was considered the largest electric cooperative under the supervision of the National Electrification Administration (NEA).

== Service area ==
The cooperative holds an exclusive franchise to distribute electricity to specific areas in Batangas. Its service area includes the cities of Lipa and Tanauan. It also serves the municipalities of Alitagtag, Balete, Cuenca, Laurel, Lobo, Malvar, Mataasnakahoy, Mabini, Padre Garcia, Rosario, San Jose, San Juan, Talisay, Taysan, and Tingloy.

== History and operations ==
=== Infrastructure and supply ===
In December 2011, BATELEC II formed a consortium with Meralco and First Bay Power Corp to acquire sub-transmission assets from the National Transmission Corporation (Transco). This acquisition included assets that allowed the group to manage the operation and maintenance of the grid lines. By 2019, the cooperative had a peak demand of 132 megawatts (MW). That same year, BATELEC II signed a supply agreement with Aboitiz Power to source 3 MW of renewable energy from the Tiwi-Makban geothermal plant.

In March 2025, Wyn Power Corp. began construction of a solar farm in Batangas intended to connect to the BATELEC II grid. This 50-megawatt project was designed to supply clean energy to industries and consumers in the cooperative's area.

=== Legal and financial issues ===
In 2011, the Regional Trial Court ordered the Lipa City government to pay PHP 20 million in unpaid electricity bills to BATELEC II. The court warned that power to city-owned properties would be cut if the debt was not settled.

In January 2017, the Supreme Court of the Philippines ruled in favor of eight former BATELEC II directors. The court found that former Justice Secretary Agnes Devanadera had abused her power by indicting them for syndicated estafa regarding contracts for computerization and trucks. The Supreme Court stated the contracts were made in good faith.

== Service issues and modernization ==
=== Consumer complaints ===
In November 2018, the Batangas Forum for Good Governance and Development Association launched a "Power Watch Movement" due to dissatisfaction with the cooperative's service. A survey at the time claimed 71% of consumers were unhappy with the service. Senate President Tito Sotto stated he would investigate the cooperative's 50-year franchise and alleged financial losses.

By late 2023, residents and business owners in municipalities like Taysan and Lobo reported frequent power outages. Local councilors filed resolutions complaining about outdated infrastructure. In November 2025, a survey by Capstone-Intel involving 1,200 residents reported that 93% of BATELEC II consumers experienced multiple outages per month.

=== Joint venture proposals ===
In 2024 and 2025, proposals were made to form a joint venture to improve the cooperative's services. Meralco submitted a proposal to inject capital and technical expertise into BATELEC II to address brownouts and modernize facilities. Meralco stated the plan was to form a partnership rather than a full takeover, intending to empower the cooperative.

In July 2025, Prime Electric Holdings Inc., led by Enrique Razon, also expressed interest in a partnership with BATELEC II. Under the Electric Power Industry Reform Act (EPIRA), cooperatives can convert into stock corporations to accept outside investment.

By November 2025, the Batangas Forum endorsed the proposed joint venture between Meralco and BATELEC II. Local mayors from the League of Municipalities of the Philippines-Batangas Chapter also expressed support for a partnership to improve the power supply for local industries and tourism.
