= Lobo River =

River in Batangas, Philippines

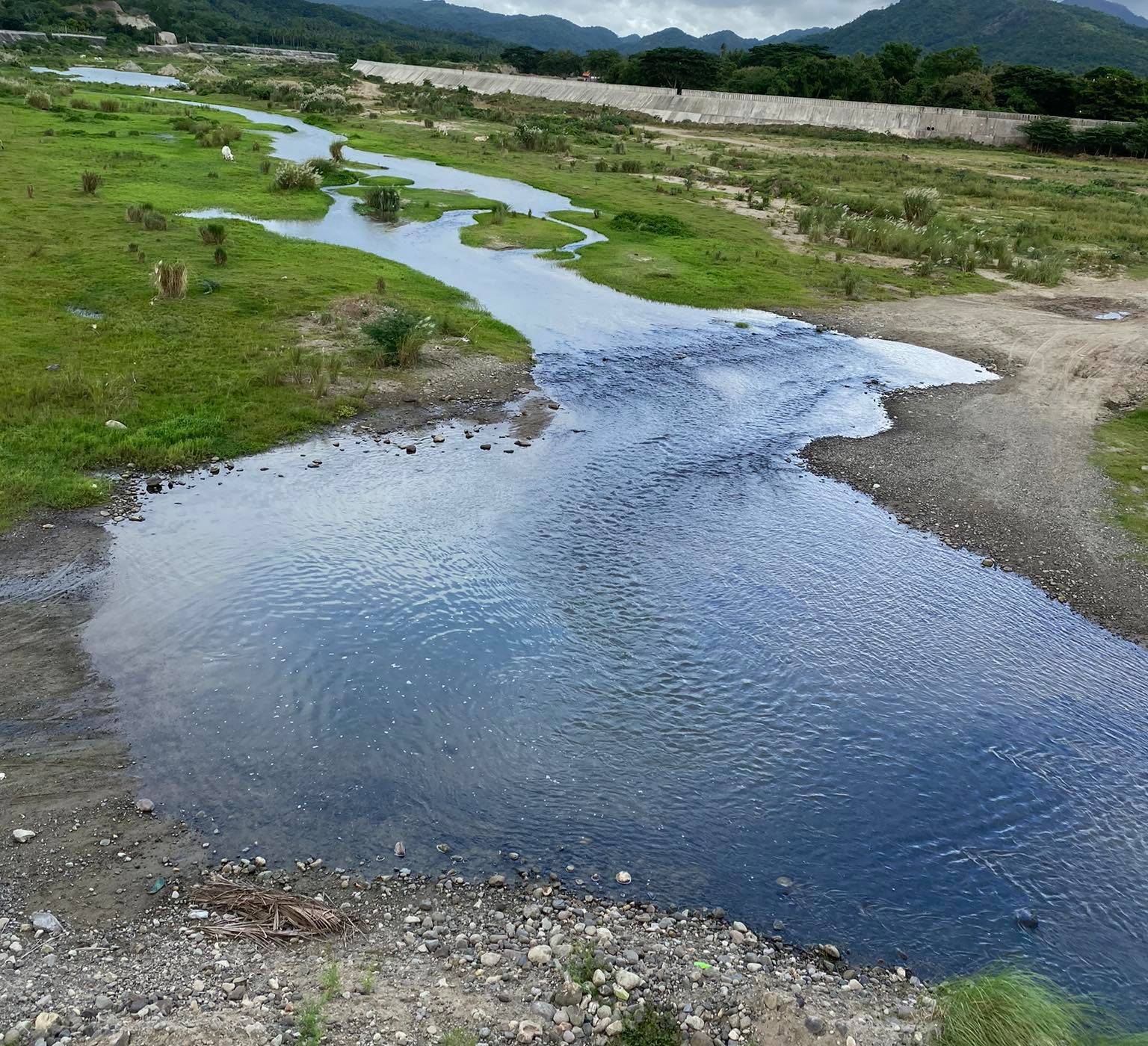
- Lobo River in Lobo, Batangas

- Lobo River mouth Lobo River (Philippines)

Location
- Country: Philippines
- Region: Calabarzon
- Province: Batangas
- Municipality: Lobo; Taysan; Rosario; San Juan

Physical characteristics
- Source: Barangay Calubcub II
  - location: San Juan
- Mouth
  - location: Verde Island Passage
  - coordinates: 13°37′48″N 121°12′00″E
  - elevation: 0 m (0 ft)
- Basin size: 26 km^{2} (10 sq mi)
- Discharge
  - location: Verde Island Passage

The Lobo River (Tagalog: Ilog Lobo) is a river located in the municipality of Lobo in the province of Batangas, Philippines. It is approximately 26 kilometers long and is considered one of the cleanest rivers in the country. The river starts at Barangay Calubcub II in San Juan, and then drains to the Verde Island Passage. Its drainage area is approximately 0.0576 square kilometres (0.02223948 sq mi) and passes into Tulay na Busog, a famous tourist spot in Lobo.

The river is an important source of water for irrigation and fishing for the people of Lobo and has many tributaries. Lobo River can easily be navigated by bangkas. A bridge over the river connects the coastal barangays of Olo-olo, Lagadlarin, Sawang, Soloc, Malabrigo, Balibago, and Biga with the rest of the municipality.

== See also ==
- List of rivers of the Philippines
