= Mount Banoy =

Mountain in Luzon, Philippines

- Banoi
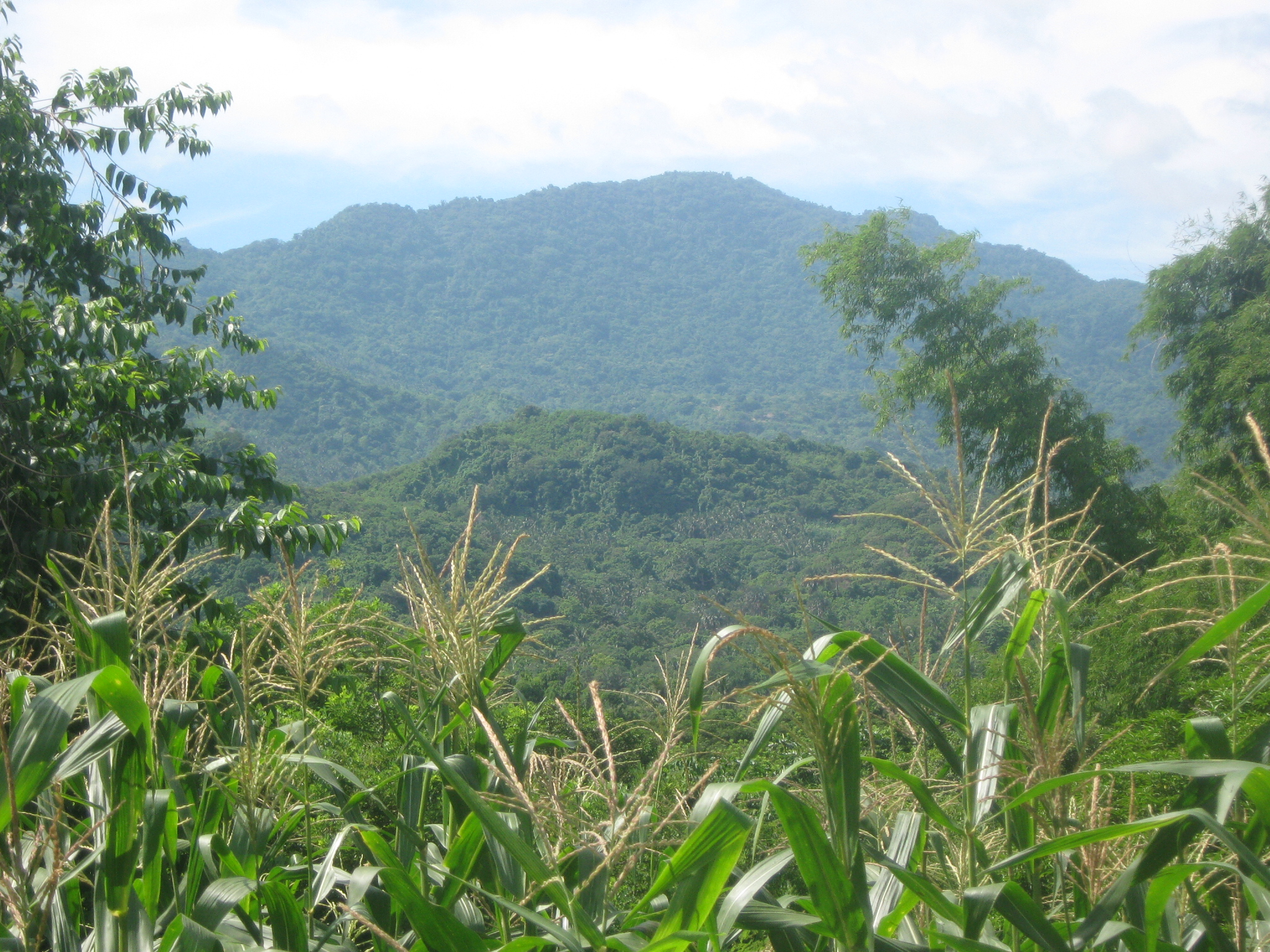
- Mount Banoy, seen from Batangas City

Highest point
- Elevation: 987 m (3,238 ft)
- Prominence: 498 m (1,634 ft)
- Listing: Mountain
- Coordinates: 13°41′51″N 121°09′55″E

Geography
- Location within Luzon Location within Philippines
- Country: Philippines
- Region: Calabarzon
- Province: Batangas
- Cities and municipalities: Batangas City; Lobo

Geology
- Mountain type: Mountain

Mount Banoy (also known as Banoi) is a mountain in Batangas and the Calabarzon region, in the central part of the country, 100 km south of the city of Manila, the capital of the country, and in the island of Luzon in the Philippines. Mount Banoy is 960 meters above sea level, or 799 meters above the surrounding terrain. Its foothills are about 23.6 kilometers wide.

Due to its high elevation, several communications and broadcasting companies constructed relay stations at the mountain summit.

== Details ==
The mountain is located between the boundary of Batangas City, and Lobo. It is one of the mountains of Lobo along with Mount Lobo (Mt. Bangkalan and Nagpatong Peak), Mt. Naguiling, Mt. Daguldol, and Mount Tibig. It also played a major role on giving Lobo its name. Some people believed that the municipality got its name from a balloon that flew into Mt. Banoy while Batangas City was celebrating their fiesta.
