= San Miguel, Lobo =

Barangay in Lobo, Batangas

San Miguel Barangay San Miguel
- Barangay
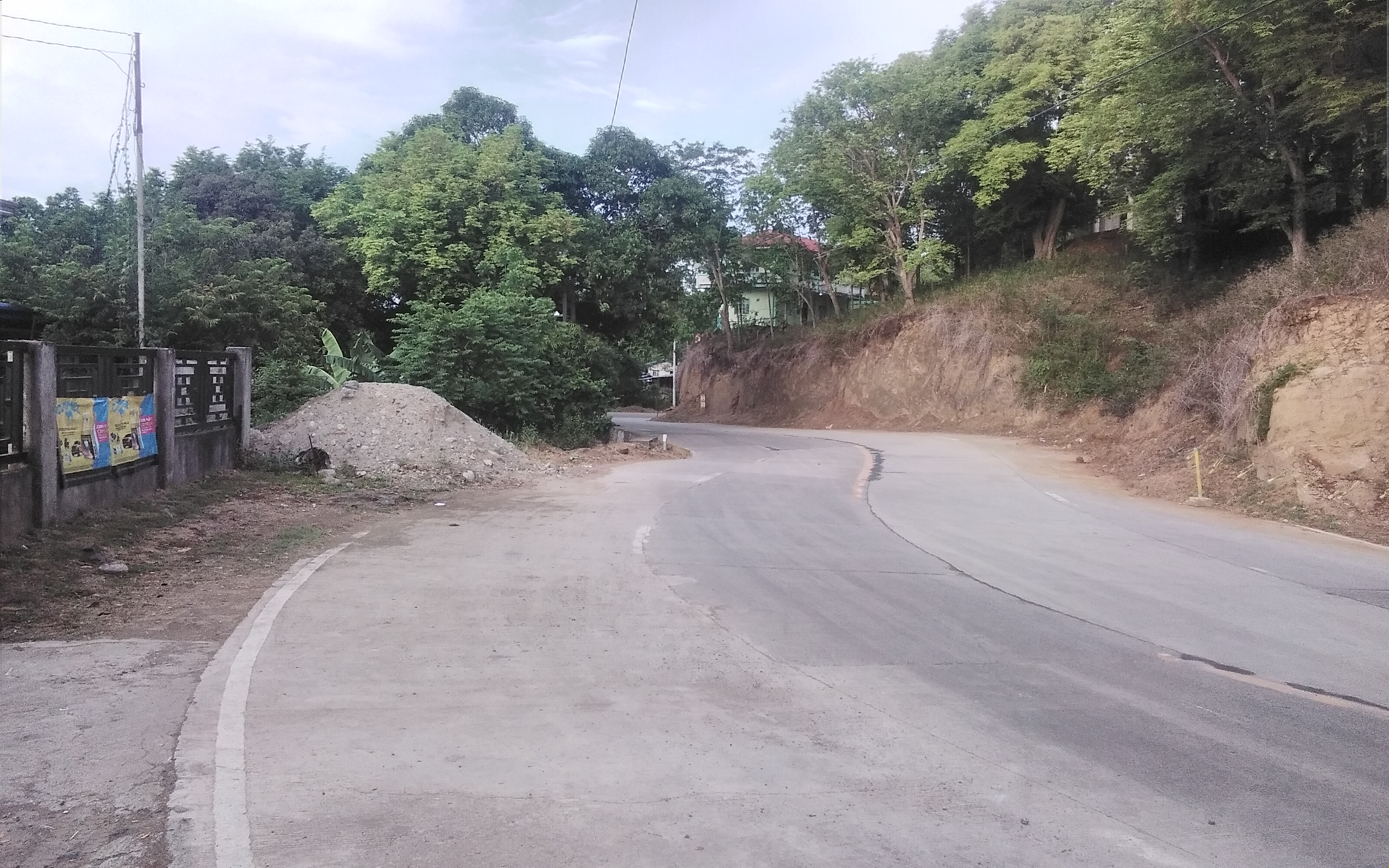
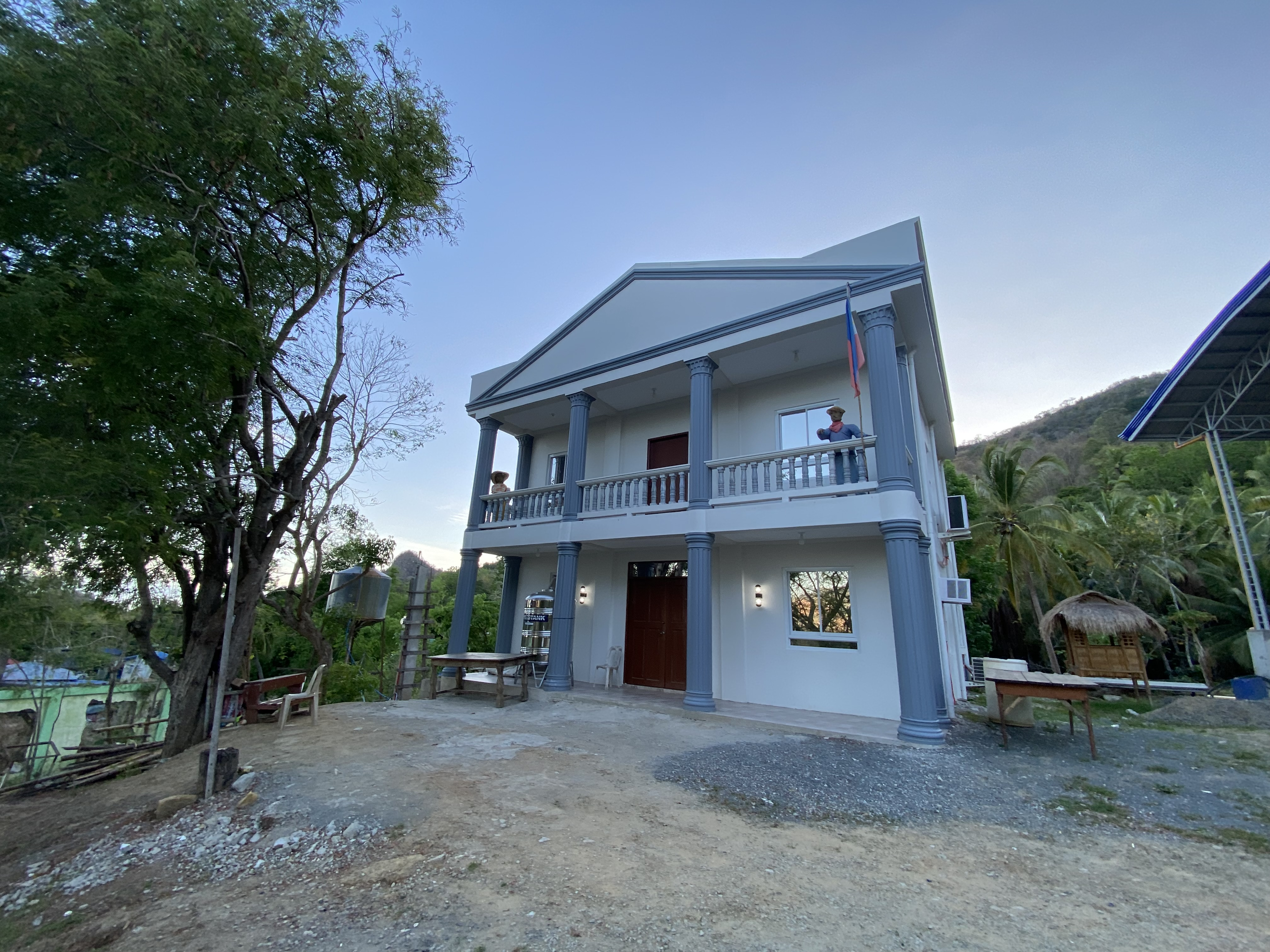
- From left to right: Sitio Centro, San Miguel Barangay Hall

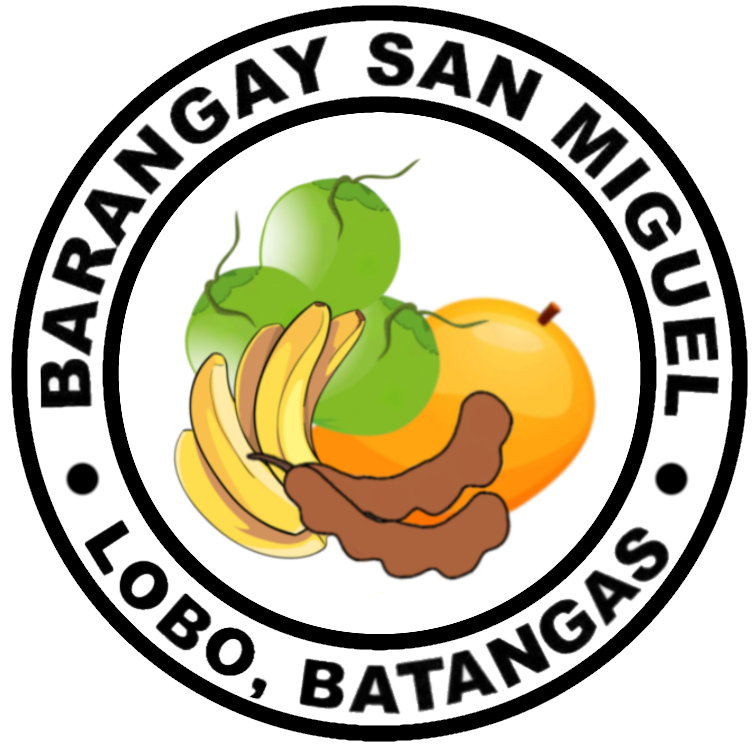
- Seal

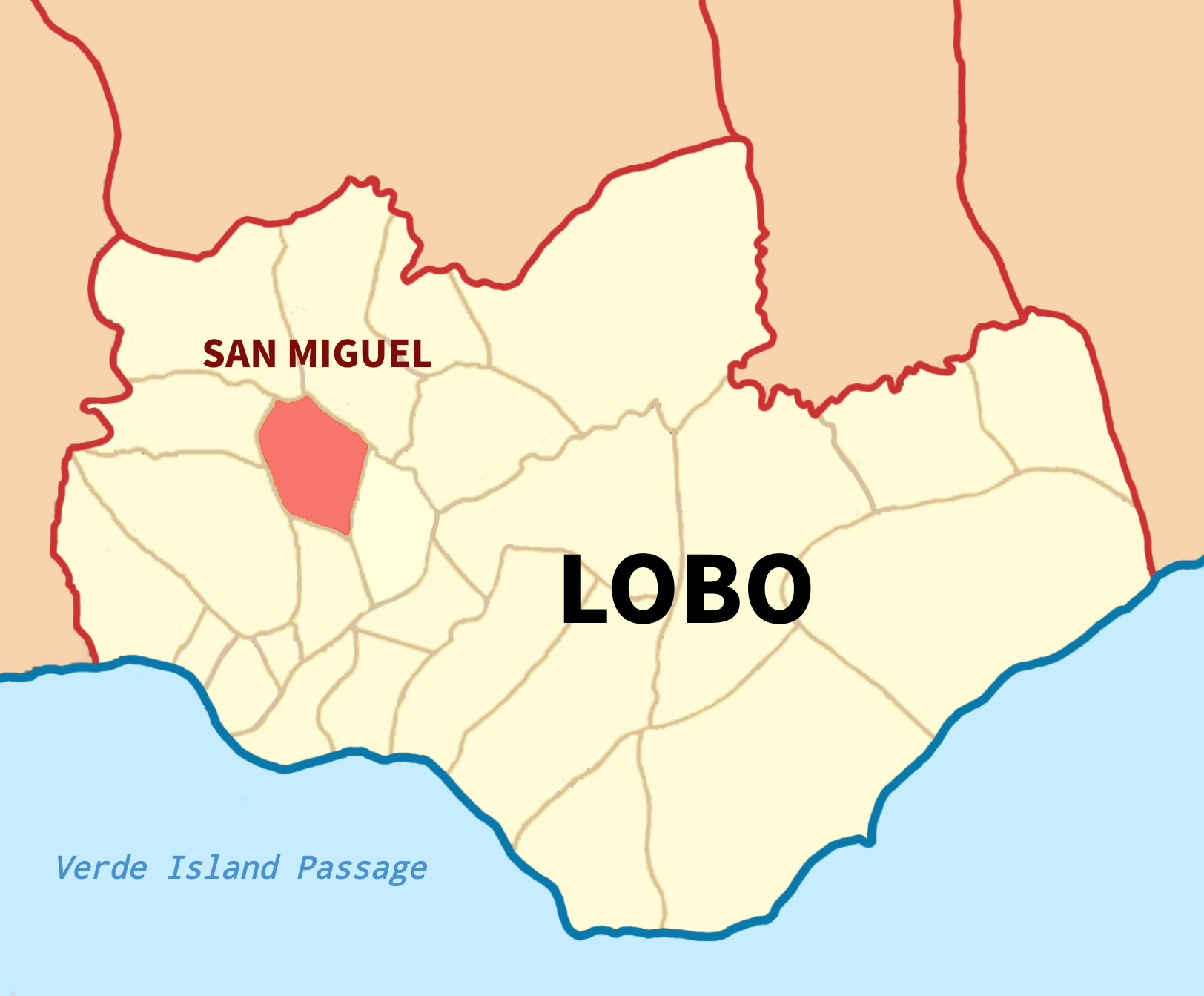
- Map of San Miguel, Lobo, Batangas
- Interactive map of San Miguel
- Location within Calabarzon
- Coordinates: 13°41′N 121°13′E
- Country: Philippines
- Region: Calabarzon
- Municipality: Lobo, Batangas
- District: 2nd District
- Established: October 28, 1959

Government
  - Type: Barangay
  - Punong Barangay: Roosevelt G. Dueñas

Area
  - Total: 3.214 km^{2} (1.241 sq mi)

Population (2020)
  - Total: 769
- Time zone: UTC+8 (PST)
- Postal Code: 4229

San Miguel (officially Barangay San Miguel) is a 5th class barangay and one of the 26 barangays constituting the municipality of Lobo, Batangas, Philippines. It is a rural community situated north of the municipality and is about ten minutes drive from Poblacion. Barangay San Miguel is politically subdivided into five sitios: Centro, Banbanan (Banbanan I, Banbanan II), Dayapan (Dayapan I and Dayapan II).

== Etymology ==
According to a legend, the origins of Barangay San Miguel are connected with Barangay Tayuman. As the story goes, while a group of respected elders were strolling through a bamboo forest one day, they were surprised by a sight—a divine image of Saint Michael manifested before their eyes. Overwhelmed by the sacredness of the encounter, the wise elders bestowed the name San Miguel upon the place. With the passage of time, the once-inseparable part of Barangay Tayuman underwent remarkable growth and development, ultimately gaining its independence as a thriving barangay.

== History ==
In the year 1959, Barangay San Miguel was once part of Tayuman along with now Balatbat, and Poblacion until it was created by the Republic Act No. 3383 (also known as the Act Converting the Sitio of Viga in Tayuman, Lobo, Batangas into the Barrio of San Miguel) in Lobo, Batangas. It is located in the north of the town and is considered a place of livelihood of the citizens. During this time, most of the residents were engaged in farming and growing crops such as rice and coconut. At that time, Barangay San Miguel consisted of three sitios - Centro, Banbanan, and Dayapan. In each sitio, there are servants (now known as "Councilors") assigned to look after the welfare of their residents. The existence of sitios shows the organizedness of the community despite the challenges of life in those times. In the political field, Barangay San Miguel is constantly changing. During the creation of municipalities and barangays under the Republic of the Philippines in 1959, Barangay San Miguel became part of the town of Lobo. In the following years, the population of the area continued to increase and the livelihood of the community continued to expand. Currently, Barangay San Miguel continues to integrate with the activities of the Municipality of Lobo.

== Geography ==
San Miguel is situated at a distance of 4.80 kilometers from the town proper, with the municipal hall located a few kilometers away. It is surrounded by neighboring areas, with Barangay Malapad na Parang to the north, Barangay Calo to the west, Barangay Balatbat to the south, and Barangay Tayuman and Barangay Nagtaluntong to the east.

=== Sitios ===
In the barangay of San Miguel, located in the municipality of Lobo, Batangas, you will find a total of 5 distinct sitios. Among them, a single sitio stands out as the urban center (bold), while the other 4 sitios is known to be simple and rural. Each sitio carries its unique nickname like for instance, in Sitio Centro, locals refer to it as "Ilaya".

| Sitios | Councilors |
|---|---|
| Sitio Banbanan I | Jenelyn Celino |
| Sitio Banbanan II | Rosalie Delica |
| Sitio Centro | Gil Catipon |
| Sitio Dayapan I | Marsina Manalo |
| Sitio Dayapan II | Racil Salamat |

== Demographics ==
Population census of San Miguel
| Year | Pop. | ±% p.a. |
|---|---|---|
| 1990 | 654 | — |
| 1995 | 723 | +1.90% |
| 2000 | 740 | +0.50% |
| 2007 | 978 | +3.92% |
| 2010 | 732 | −10.01% |
| 2015 | 802 | +1.75% |
| 2020 | 769 | −0.88% |
Source: Philippine Statistics Authority

== Infastracture and utilities ==
BATELEC II brings electricity to Barangay San Miguel while telephone communication and internet connection is given by Globe Telecom. The Lobo Water District is the water supply provider for this barangay.

Until today, projects are made like: Improving Of Barangay Access Road, Slope Protection, and Road Improvement. These projects helps tourists and locals of the community so they can be safe. They also put lights on the center of the road so when it's dark, you can still see where your going. It is also one of the only barangays that has a bridge named San Miguel Bridge.

== Gallery ==
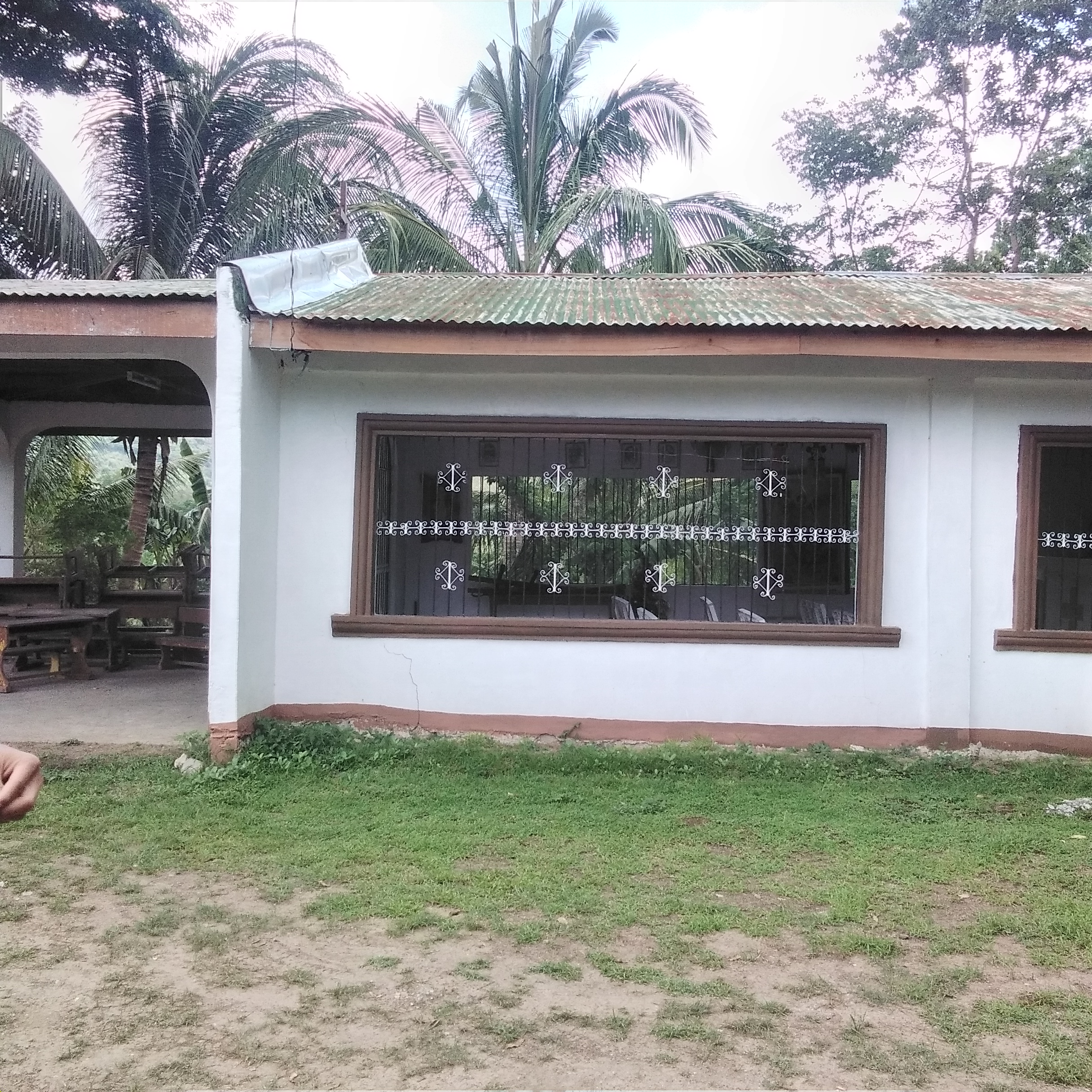
Chapel

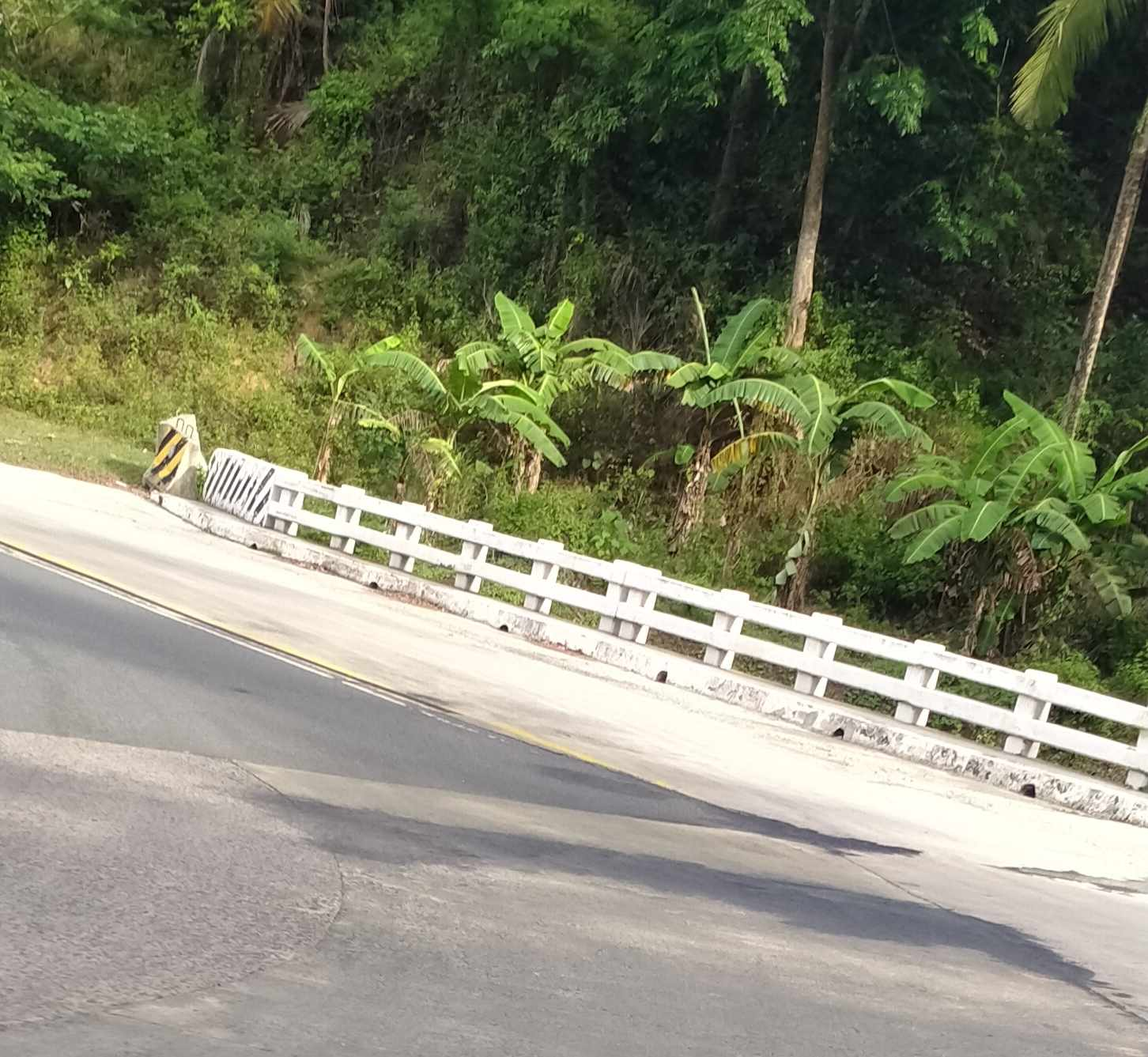
San Miguel Bridge

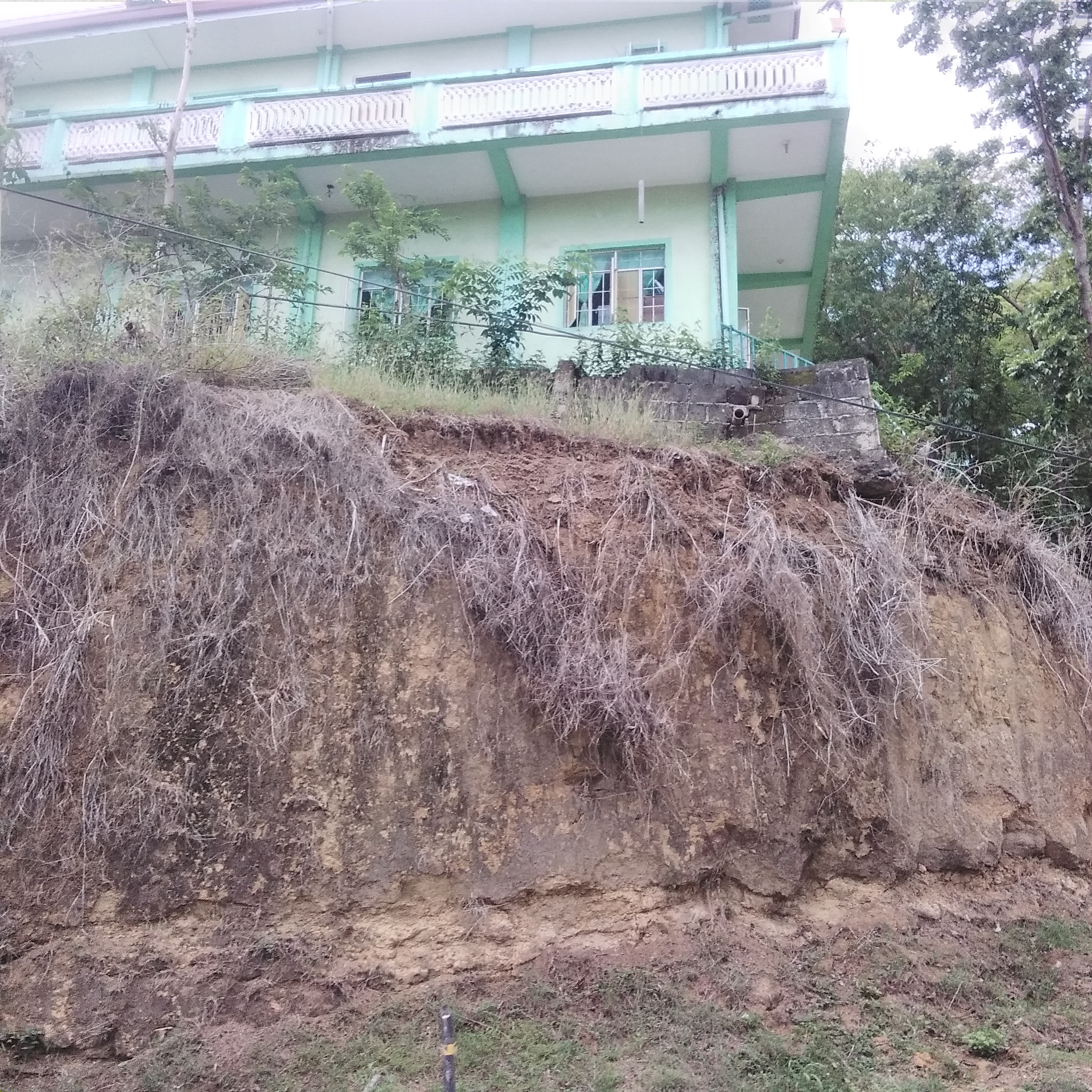
Barangay hall

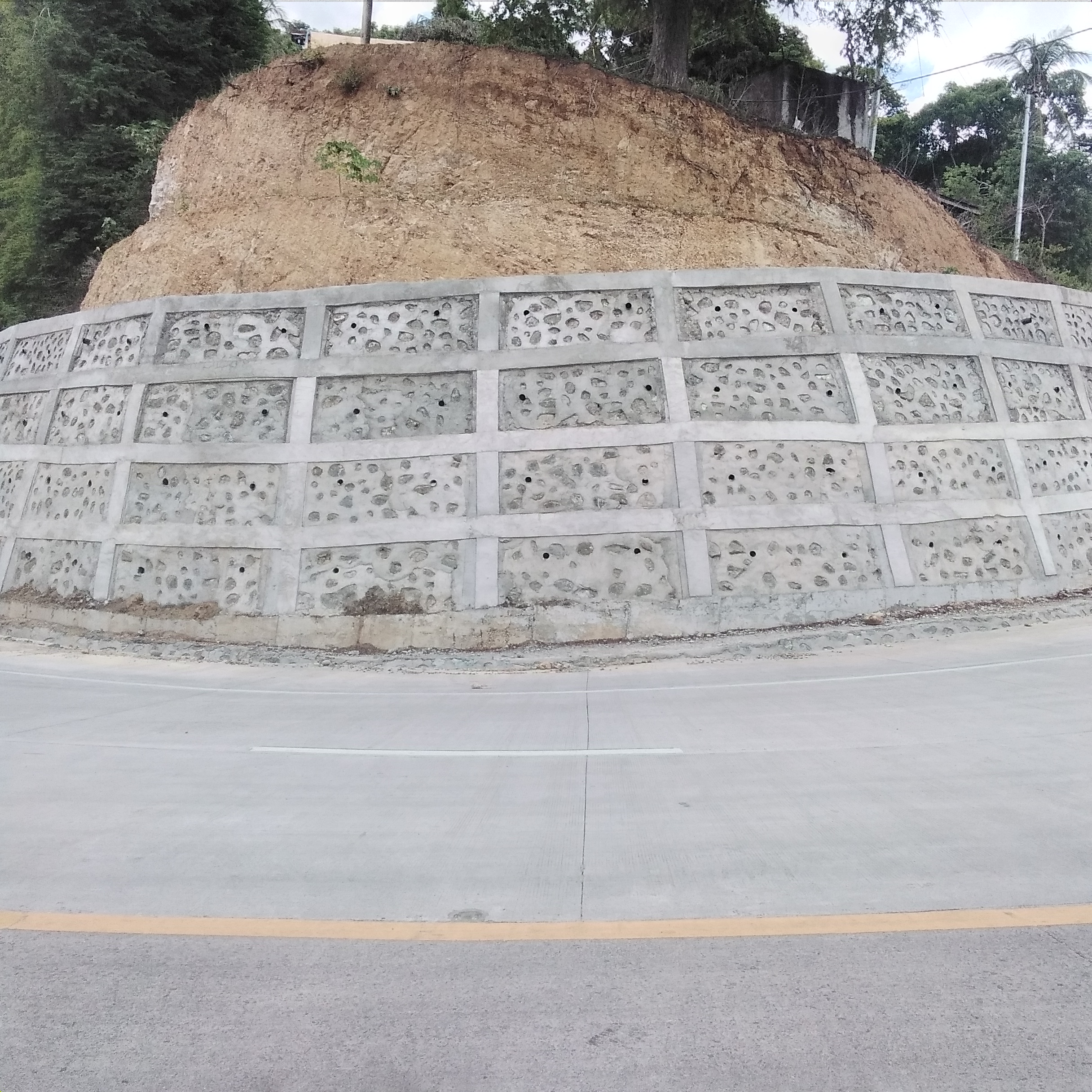
Slope Protection
