= Lobo, Batangas =

Municipality in Batangas, Philippines

Lobo
- Municipality
- Municipality of Lobo
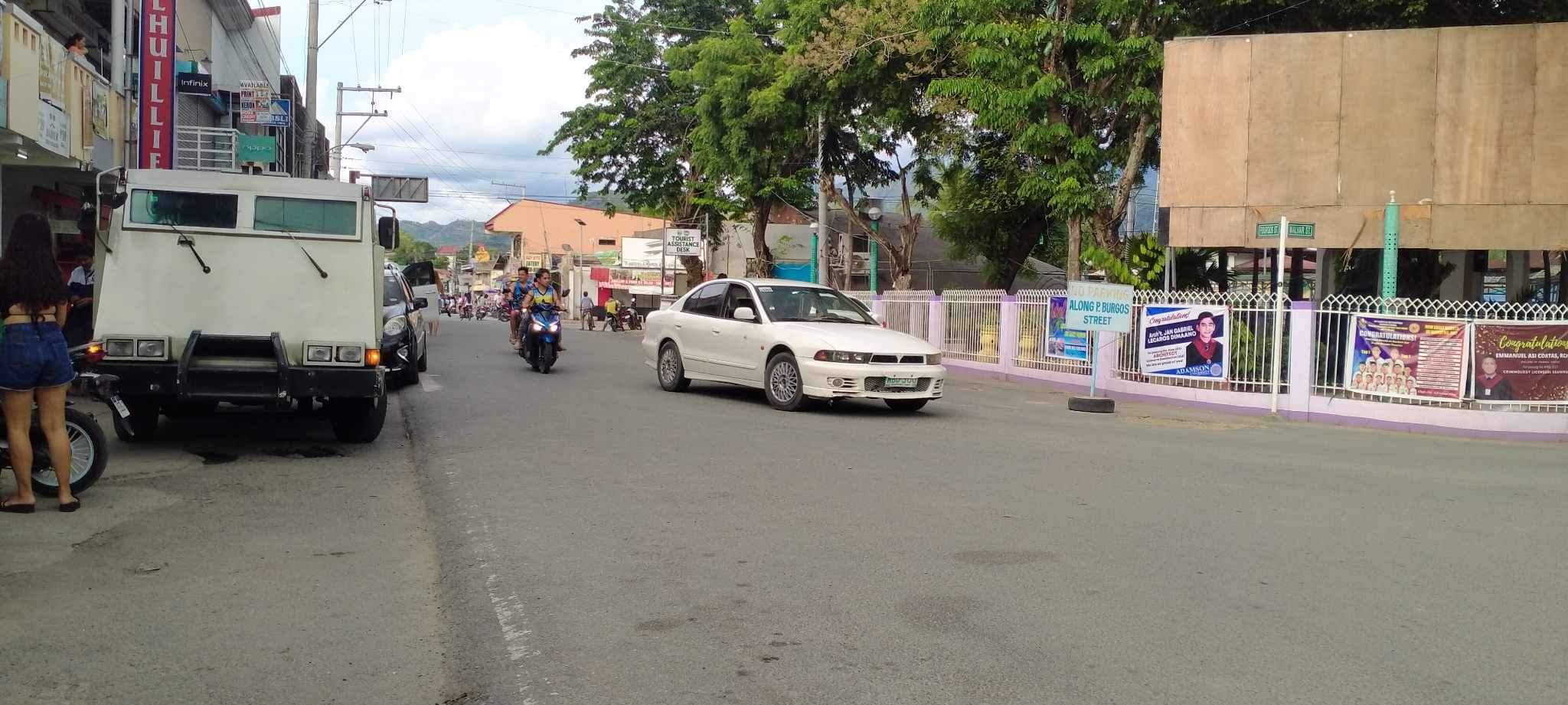
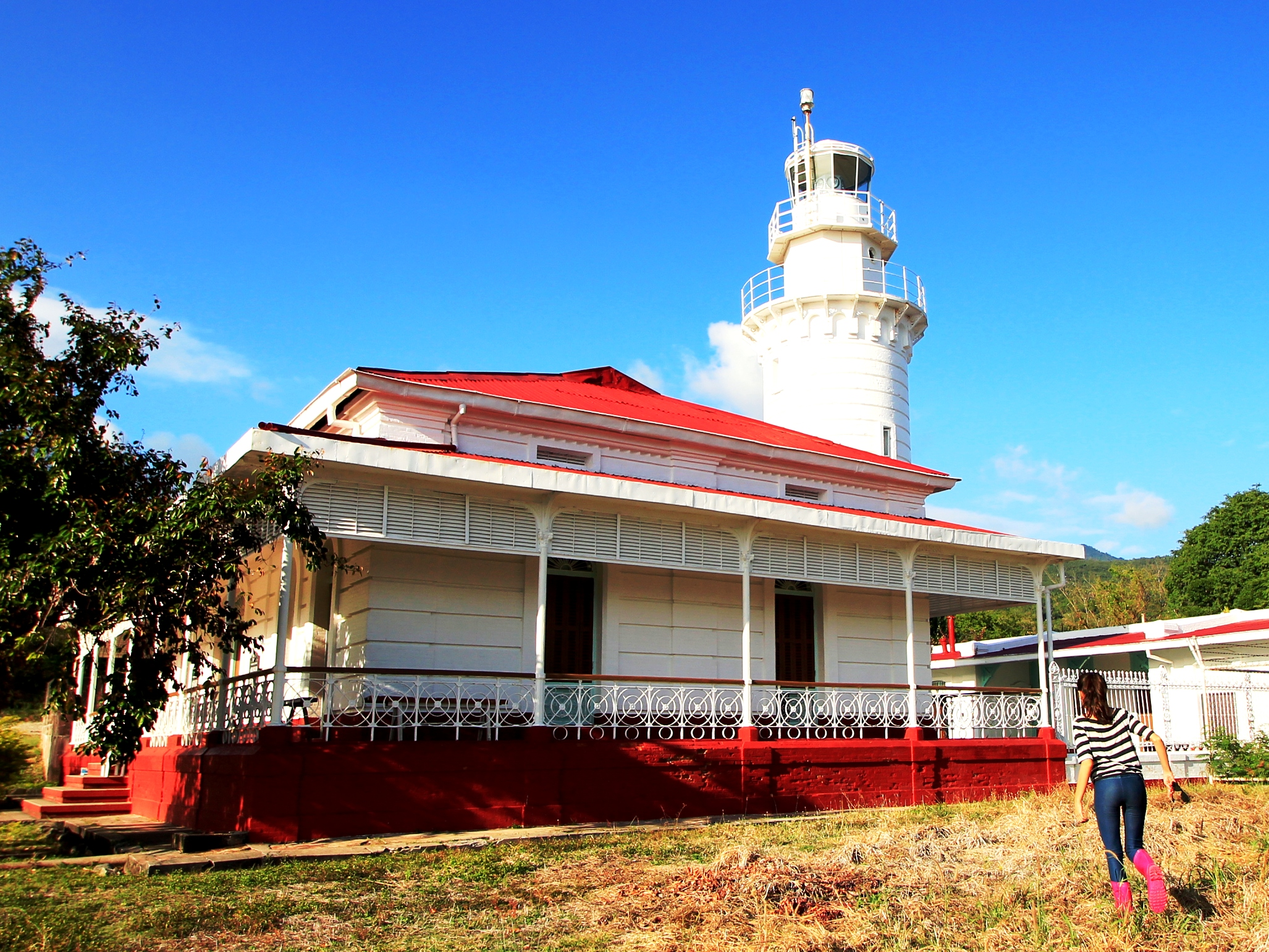
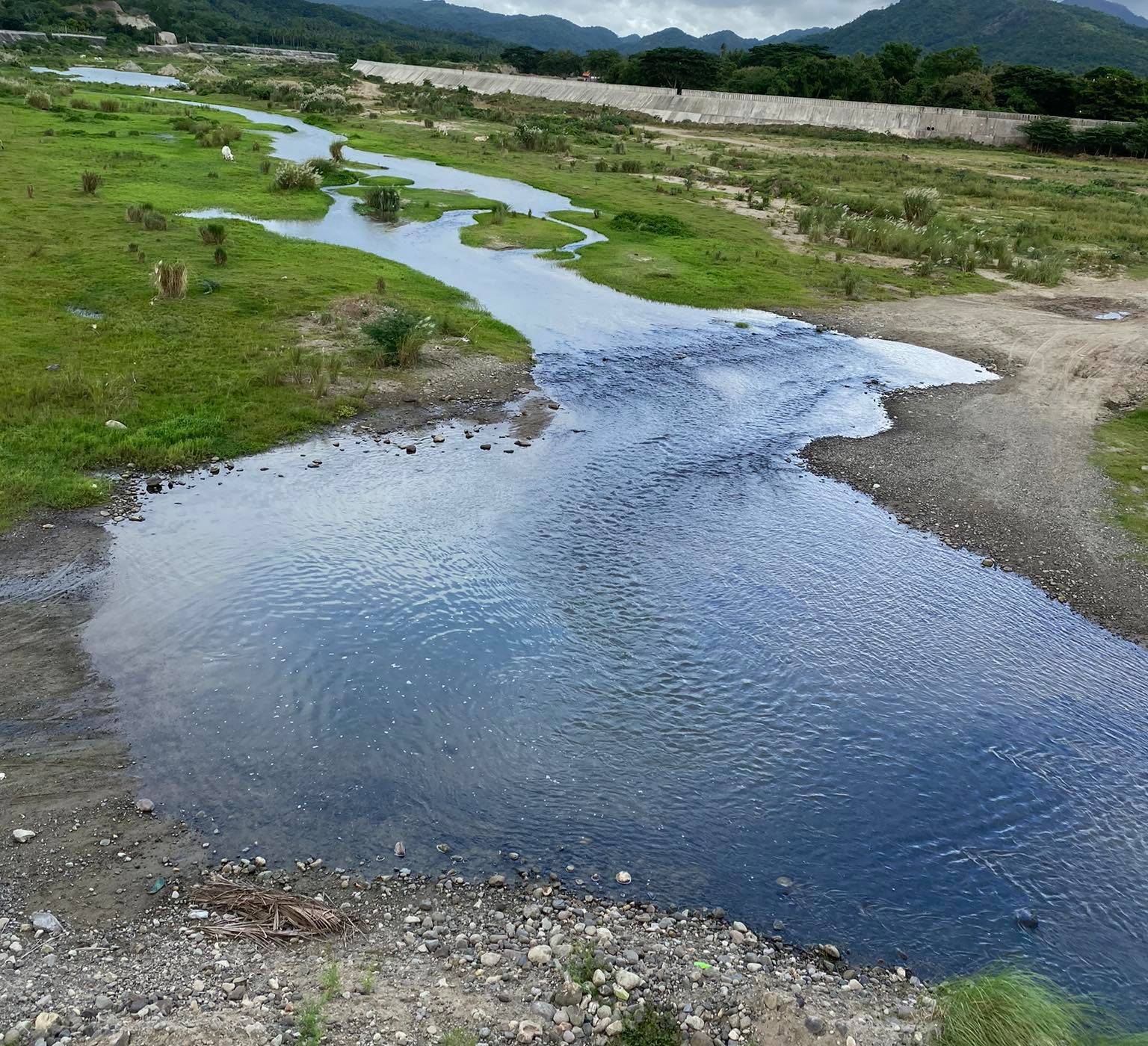
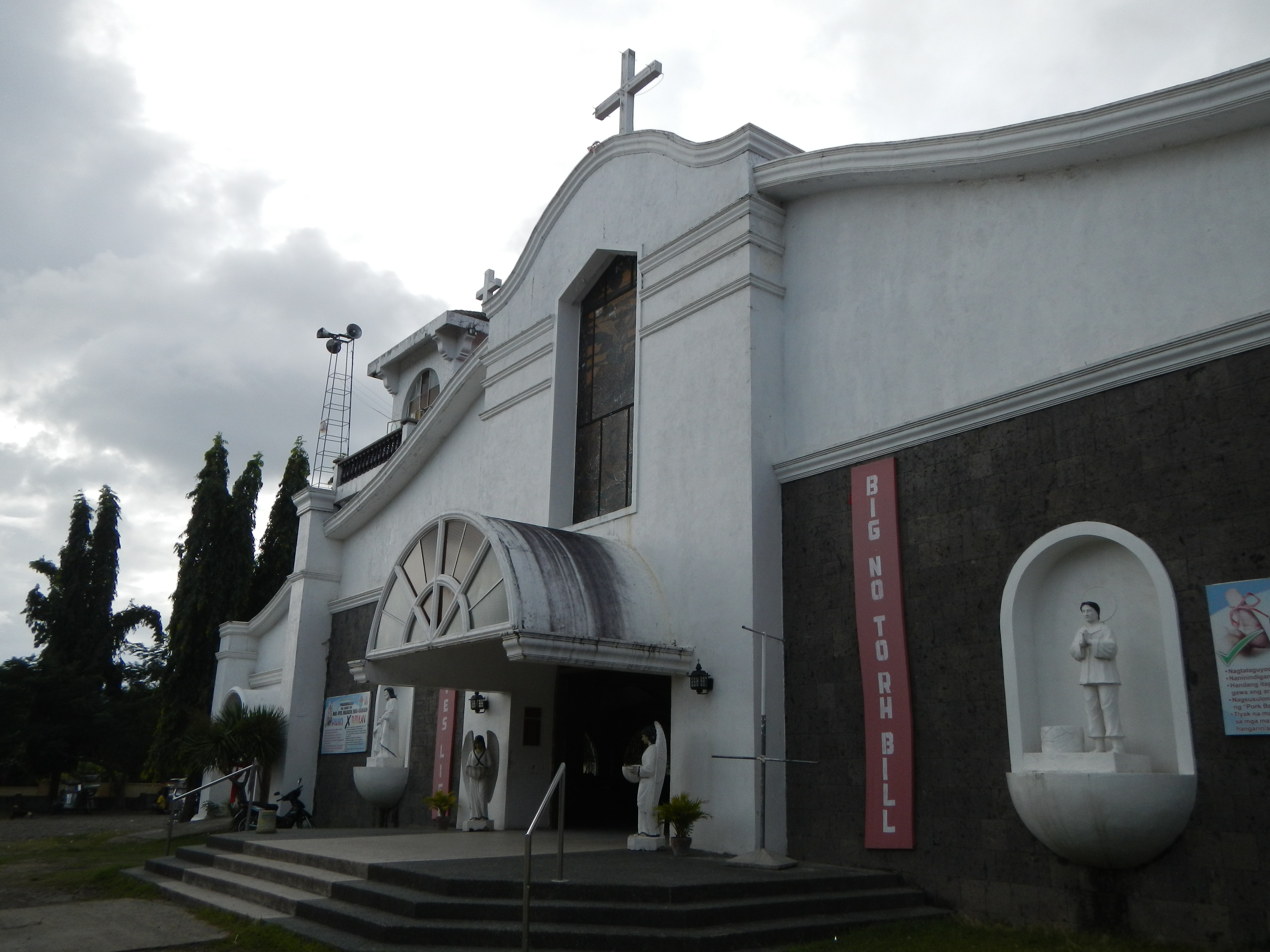
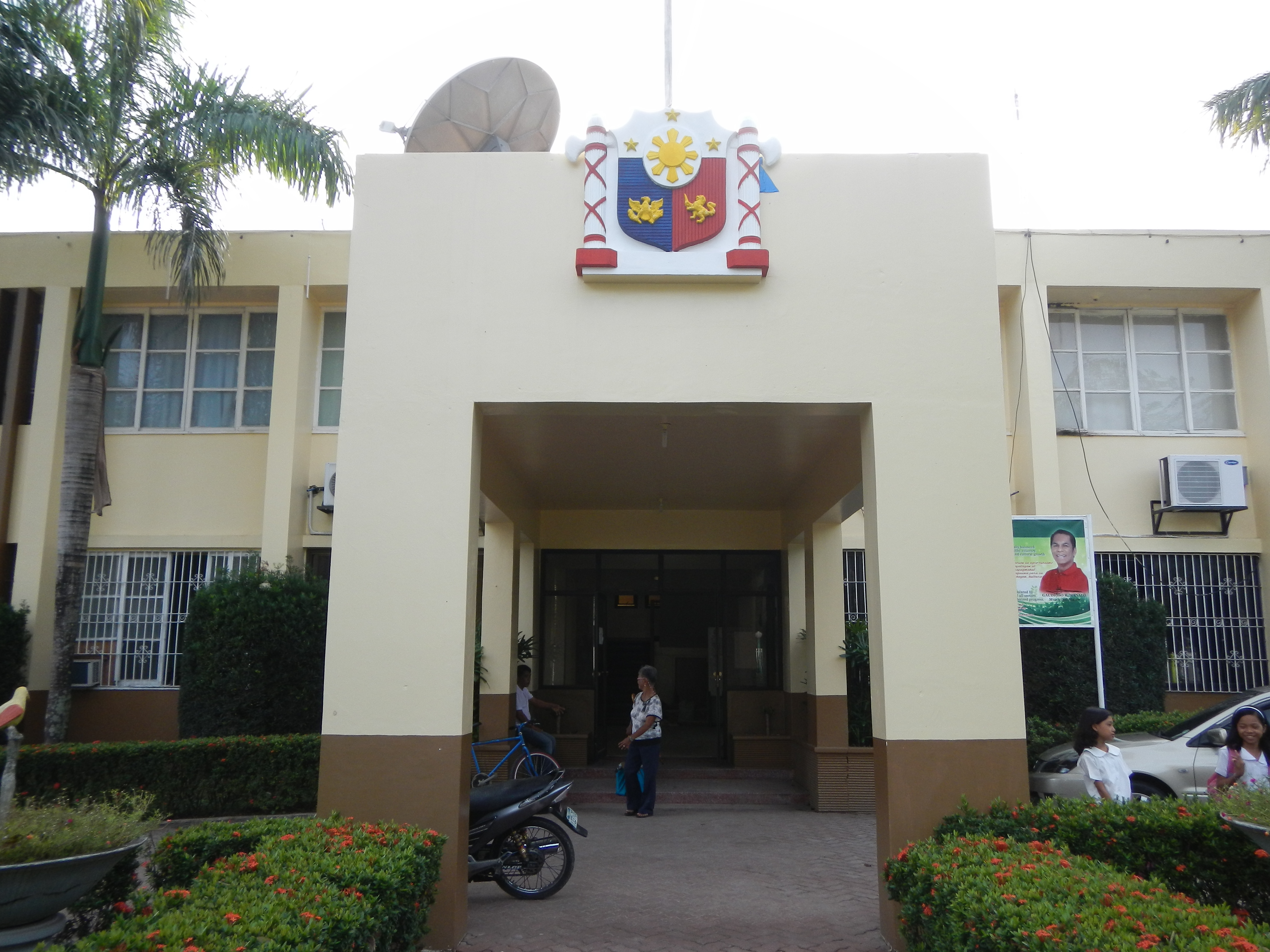
- From top to bottom: Downtown, Malabrigo Point Lighthouse, Lobo River, Saint Michael the Archangel Parish, Municipal Hall

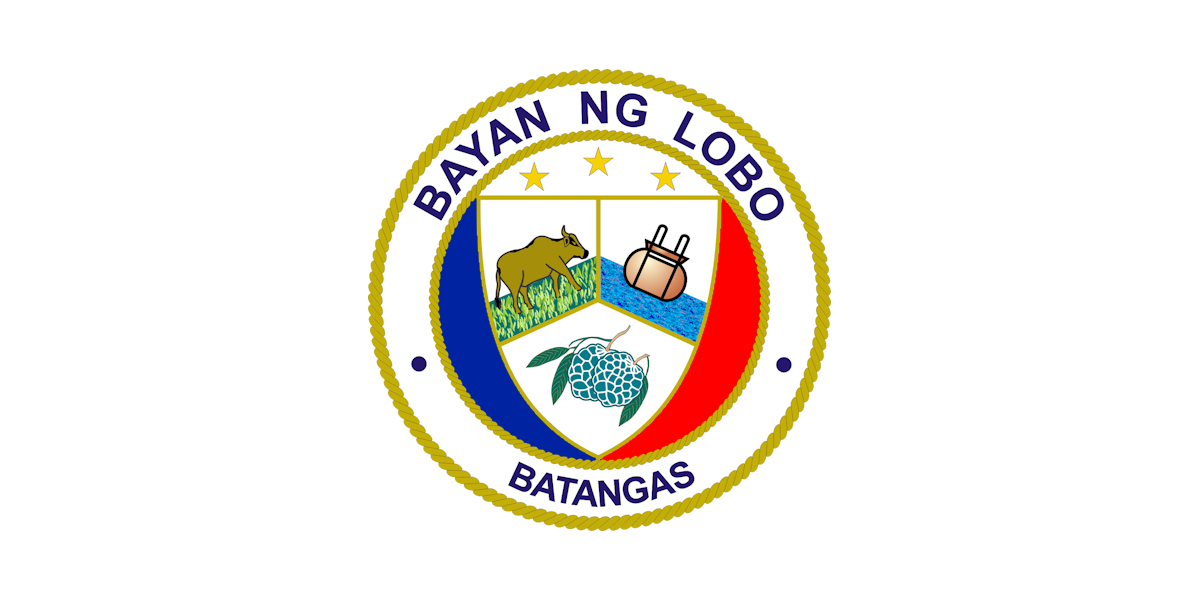
- Flag Seal
- Etymology: Wolf
- Nickname: Atis Capital of the Philippines
- Anthem: "Himno ng Lobo"
- Map of Batangas with Lobo highlighted
- Interactive map of Lobo
- Location within the Philippines
- Coordinates: 13°38′50″N 121°12′37″E
- Country: Philippines
- Region: Calabarzon
- Province: Batangas
- District: 2nd district
- Founded: September 27, 1871
- Barangays: 26 (see Barangays)

Government
  - Type: Sangguniang Bayan
  - Mayor: Geronimo C. Alfiler
  - Vice Mayor: Angelito H. Abiera
  - Representative: Gerville R. Luistro
  - Municipal Council: Members: Victoriano C. Dueñas; Leslee M. Aguilar; Ridian J. Dueñas; Chritzaldy Kim B. Manalo; John Joseph G. Comia; Mark Ernani R. You; Bienvenido F. Aliwalas Jr.; Jake B. Paglicawan; Renato B. Lat - ABC President; Gian Carlo L. Manalo - PPSK
  - Electorate: 29,032 voters (2025)

Area
  - Total: 175.03 km^{2} (67.58 sq mi)
- Elevation: 109 m (358 ft)
- Highest elevation: 905 m (2,969 ft)
- Lowest elevation: 0 m (0 ft)

Population (2024 census)
  - Total: 41,251
  - Density: 235.68/km^{2} (610.41/sq mi)
  - Households: 9,944

Economy
  - Income class: 1st municipal income class
  - Poverty incidence: 12.82% (2023)
  - Revenue: ₱ 291.2 million (2024)
  - Assets: ₱ 887.4 million (2024)
  - Expenditure: ₱ 157.1 million (2024)
  - Liabilities: ₱ 273.5 million (2024)

Service provider
  - Electricity: Batangas 2 Electric Cooperative (BATELEC 2)
- Time zone: UTC+8 (PST)
- ZIP code: 4229
- PSGC: 0401015000
- IDD : area code: +63 (0)43
- Native languages: Tagalog
- Major religion/s: Roman Catholic
- Feast date: September 23–30
- Catholic diocese: Archdiocese of Lipa
- Patron saint: Saint Michael
- Website: www.lobo.gov.ph

Lobo, officially the Municipality of Lobo (Tagalog: Bayan ng Lobo), is a municipality in the province of Batangas, Philippines. According to the 2024 census, it has a population of 41,251 people.

== Etymology ==
The name "Lobo" may have come from:

1. the Spanish and Tagalog term for "wolf", lobo
2. the Tagalog word "lubog", that later became the word "Lobu" or "Lobo"
3. the Lobo River, which flows through Lobo itself and
4. a balloon that landed into Mt. Banoi.

The town was proclaimed as the "Atis Capital of the Philippines" through Resolution 2011-61 in September 2011.

== History ==
=== Legend of Datu Kumintang and Gat Bahaghari ===
According to legend, Lobo was first inhabited by the followers of Datu Kumintang of Borneo, along with Gat Bahaghari and his family. They traveled to Rosario and trailing along the Rosario-Lobo River, they reached the “Wawa of Lobo” (now Fabrica) which his followers named Bahaghari in honor of Gat Bahaghari. Attracted by the panoramic view and soil fertility of this place, Gat Bahaghari and his followers decided to establish a permanent settlement in this area.

Some followers of Gat Bahaghari thought that in order to detect approaching pirates, they built their houses on the top of a hill overlooking the sea which is now the Municipal Cemetery of Lobo.

Beneath the hill on the west side is low land treasured with sumasagitsit or running tiny streams of water which they utilized to irrigate their farms. With the help of the streams, their farms became very productive that enabled them to transport their excess products to their bountiful harvests, they replied that they came from sumasagitsit. The term sumasagitsit was later on changed to Masagitsit until it was changed as Barangay Masaguitsit.

=== Foreign rule ===
Lobo's history is related with that of Rosario. Rosario was founded by Augustinian friars in 1687 that originated from the southeastern coast of Batangas which is Lobo. When Rosario was founded, Lobo became a barrio of Rosario with the present municipalities of Taysan, San Juan, and Padre Garcia.

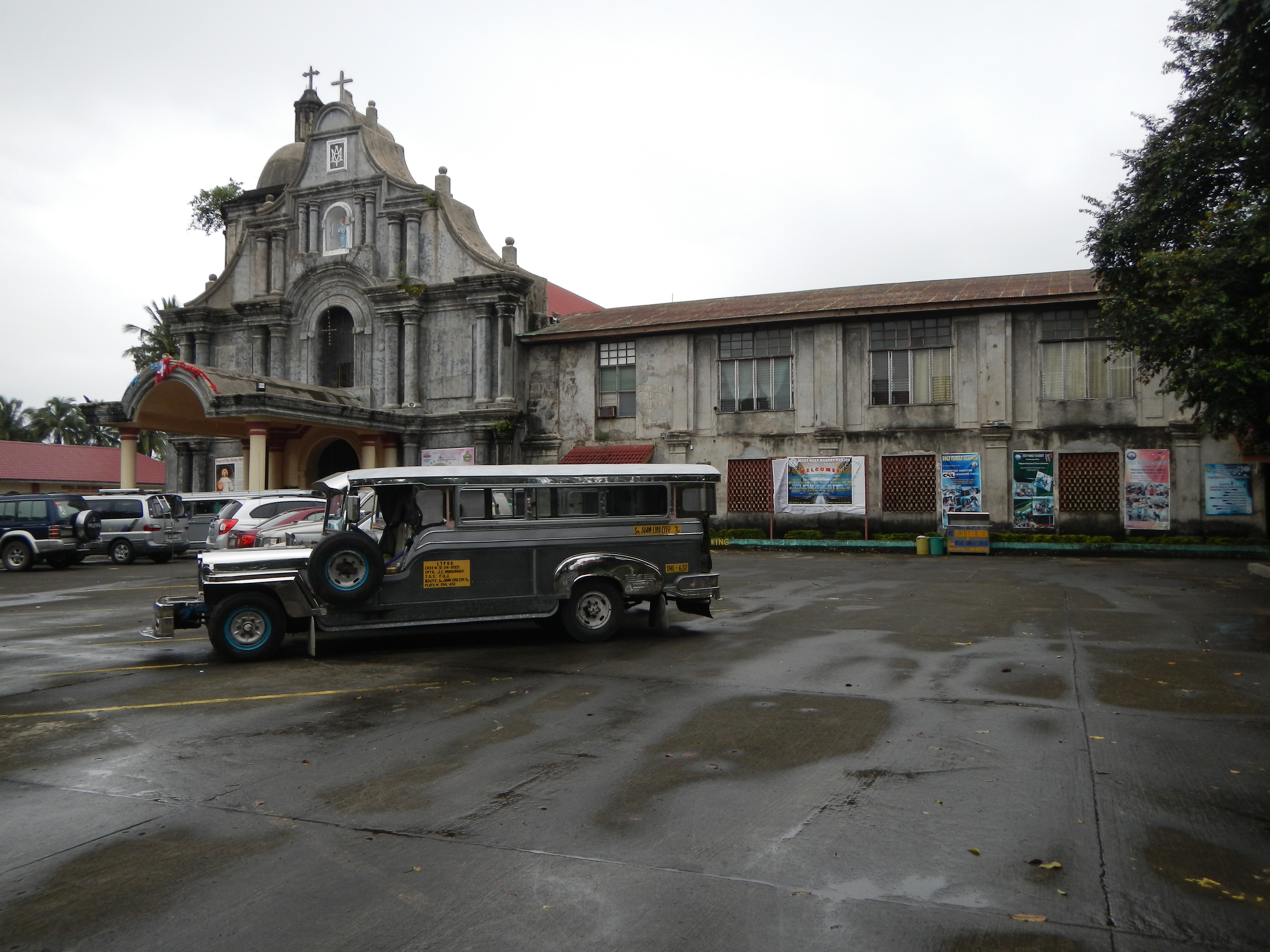
The first stone church of Rosario in Padre Garcia

The inhabitants were forced to flee the coast of Lobo to avoid the Moros, during which they recited the rosary, giving Rosario its name. The settlement was reestablished at the north-west bank of Kansahayan River in Hilerang Kawayan, now a barangay called Pinagbayanan in Taysan. However, at the height of the Moro Wars in the second half of the 18th century, the Moro raids reached Hilerang Kawayan. Fearing more attacks from the Moros, Rosario was relocated again by the Dominican priests and headed north from Hilerang Kawayan while holding a novena and praying the rosary. On the last day of the novena, the inhabitants settled at the river bank of Tubig ng Bayan, now Padre Garcia. The residents erected a stone church south of the river bank and dedicated it to their saint, the Lady of the Rosary. The town was named Santo Rosario and remained in the location for a long time until 1902.

On December 12, 1848, the barrio of Bolboc was separated from Rosario and was named San Juan de Bocboc, then in 1850, the barrio of Mercedes became Taysan. It was not until September 27, 1871 that the barrio of Lobo became an independent municipality. Settlers residing in the place gathered together to decide the name until they saw a balloon from people celebrating their fiesta in the municipality of Batangas fly towards Mt. Banoi. They were amazed that they named the place Lobo to commemorate the incident. The parish of Lobo was established on February 4, 1873 and was dedicated to Saint Michael.

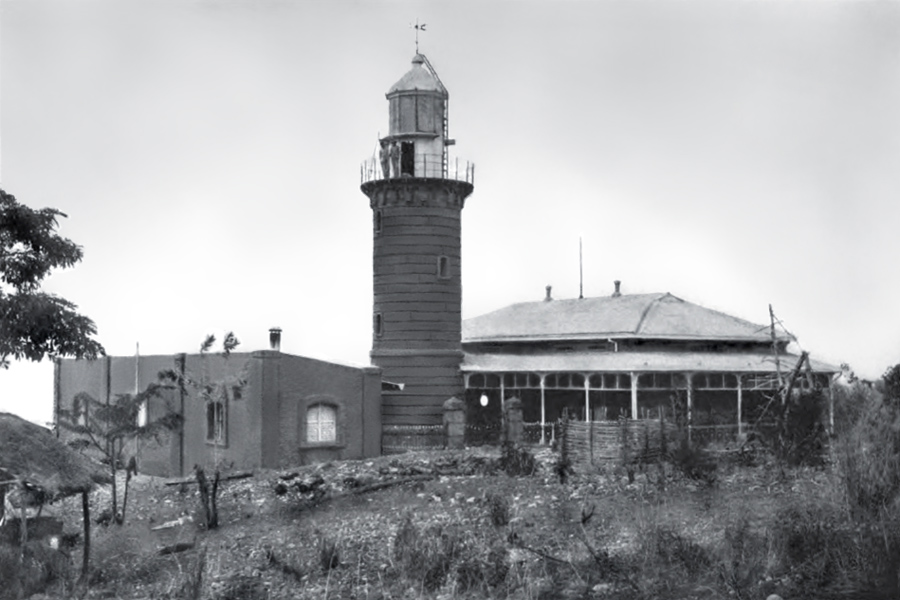
Malabrigo Lighthouse in 1903 after being finished

According to Manuel Sastron's publication of Batangas y Su Provincia, he described Lobo as the most remarkably isolated municipality in Batangas as travel to Lobo was difficult due to the narrow road towards the town center and dangerous sea waves for small boats. He recorded that Lobo's population in the 19th century was only 6,700 people. He referenced the Lobo River as being large and being fed by four to five tributaries. Sastron said that Lobo was peaceful and crimes rarely occur.

Before the end of the Spanish period, the Malabrigo Point Lighthouse was proposed to be made in barrio Malabrigo. It was one among the Spaniards built as part of the Plan General de Alumbrado de Maritimo de las Costas del Archipelago de Filipino which would make 55 lighthouses in the Philippines.

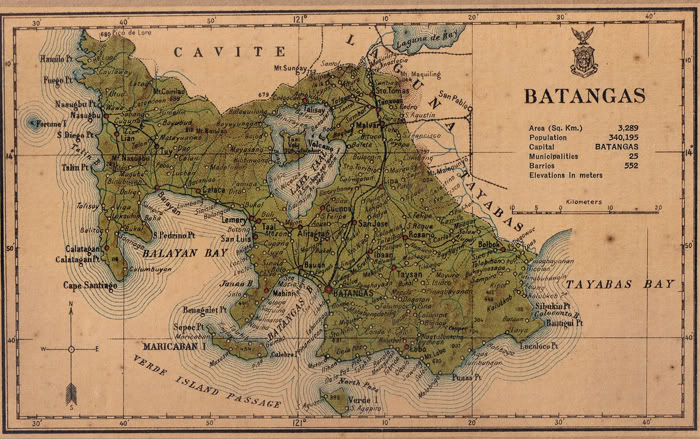
1918 Map of Batangas with Lobo and barrios

When the American occupation began, Lobo was consolidated to Taysan through the Act No. 708 but became independent again when Taysan was consolidated to Rosario in the same year through Act No. 958. Lobo was commonly misspelled as Loboo by the Americans.

== Geography ==
Lobo is located at 13°38′50″N 121°12′37″E. The town is located near the southern tip of the Batangas province, about 145 kilometres (90 mi) from Manila.

Lobo has white sand beaches and has protected mangrove forests and fish sanctuaries.

According to the Philippine Statistics Authority, the municipality has a land area of 175.03 square kilometres (67.58 sq mi) constituting 5.61% of the 3,119.75-square-kilometre- (1,204.54 sq mi) total area of Batangas.

=== Barangays ===
Lobo is politically subdivided into 26 barangays, as shown in the matrix below. Each barangay consists of puroks and some have sitios.

According to the 2020 census, the most populated barangay in Lobo is Balibago with 3,454 residents living while the least populated barangay in Lobo is Malalim na Sanog with 306 residents living. Lobo originally had 7 barangays named as Masagitsit (now Masaguitsit), Bignay, Tayuman, Malapad na Parang, Mabilog na Bundok, Malabrigo, and Sabana (non-existent as of present).

In 1959, the sitio of Biga in Barangay Tayuman was converted into a barangay.

PSGC	Barangay	Population			±% p.a.	
		2024		2010		
041015001	Apar	2.9%	1,176	959	▴	1.42%
041015002	Balatbat	5.8%	2,400	2,137	▴	0.81%
041015003	Balibago	8.4%	3,454	2,967	▴	1.06%
041015004	Banalo	6.1%	2,515	2,195	▴	0.95%
041015005	Biga	4.9%	2,030	1,782	▴	0.91%
041015006	Bignay	1.2%	501	432	▴	1.03%
041015007	Calo	2.2%	918	913	▴	0.04%
041015008	Calumpit	2.0%	819	734	▴	0.76%
041015009	Fabrica	5.0%	2,056	1,742	▴	1.16%
041015010	Jaybanga	4.5%	1,873	1,652	▴	0.87%
041015011	Lagadlarin	5.1%	2,086	1,853	▴	0.82%
041015012	Mabilog na Bundok	4.2%	1,740	1,675	▴	0.26%
041015013	Malabrigo	4.2%	1,744	1,546	▴	0.84%
041015014	Malalim na Sanog	0.7%	306	205	▴	2.81%
041015015	Malapad na Parang	3.5%	1,461	1,455	▴	0.03%
041015016	Masaguitsit	3.3%	1,377	1,234	▴	0.76%
041015017	Nagtalongtong	5.0%	2,066	1,994	▴	0.25%
041015018	Nagtoctoc	1.5%	617	591	▴	0.30%
041015019	Olo‑olo	3.4%	1,406	1,377	▴	0.14%
041015020	Pinaghawanan	1.2%	488	419	▴	1.06%
041015021	San Miguel	1.9%	802	732	▴	0.63%
041015022	San Nicolas	2.3%	939	763	▴	1.45%
041015023	Sawang	5.2%	2,138	1,831	▴	1.08%
041015024	Soloc	5.4%	2,223	1,801	▴	1.47%
041015025	Tayuman	4.0%	1,652	1,409	▴	1.11%
041015026	Poblacion	6.6%	2,717	2,672	▴	0.12%
	Total		41,251	37,070	▴	0.74%

=== Climate ===
Climate data for Lobo, Batangas
Month	Jan	Feb	Mar	Apr	May	Jun	Jul	Aug	Sep	Oct	Nov	Dec	Year
Mean daily maximum °C (°F)	27 (81)	28 (82)	30 (86)	32 (90)	31 (88)	30 (86)	29 (84)	29 (84)	29 (84)	29 (84)	28 (82)	27 (81)	29 (84)
Mean daily minimum °C (°F)	21 (70)	20 (68)	21 (70)	22 (72)	24 (75)	24 (75)	24 (75)	24 (75)	24 (75)	23 (73)	22 (72)	22 (72)	23 (73)
Average precipitation mm (inches)	52 (2.0)	35 (1.4)	27 (1.1)	27 (1.1)	82 (3.2)	124 (4.9)	163 (6.4)	144 (5.7)	145 (5.7)	141 (5.6)	100 (3.9)	102 (4.0)	1,142 (45)
Average rainy days	12.0	8.1	8.8	9.7	17.9	22.6	26.2	24.5	24.6	22.0	16.7	14.9	208
Source: Meteoblue

== Demographics ==
Population census of Lobo
Year	Pop.	±% p.a.
1903	5,781	—
1918	6,999	+1.28%
1939	8,964	+1.19%
1948	11,711	+3.01%
1960	15,197	+2.19%
1970	19,376	+2.46%
1975	22,092	+2.67%
1980	24,333	+1.95%
1990	26,881	+1.00%
1995	31,849	+3.23%
2000	33,909	+1.35%
2007	37,798	+1.51%
2010	37,070	−0.71%
2015	41,504	+2.18%
2020	40,736	−0.39%
2024	41,251	+0.30%
Source: Philippine Statistics Authority

In the 2024 census, Lobo had a population of 41,251 people. The population density was 240 inhabitants per square kilometre (620/sq mi).

== Economy ==
Poverty incidence of Lobo (%)

Source: Philippine Statistics Authority

== Government ==
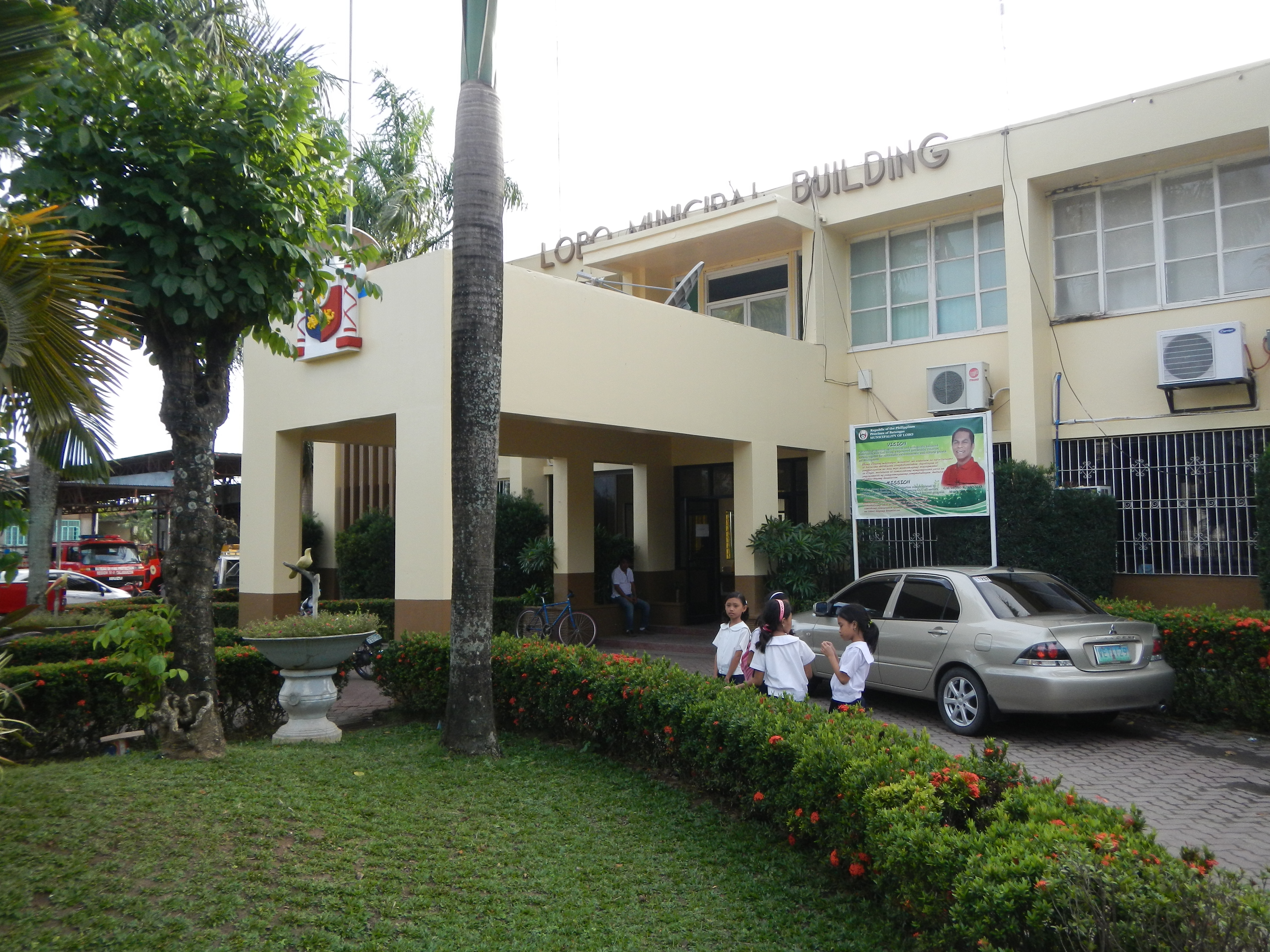
Municipal hall before 2021

=== Elected officials ===
Lota L. Manalo and Jurly R. Manalo are the current mayor and vice mayor, respectively.

The Municipal Councilors are:

- Geronimo Alfiler
- Angelito Abiera
- Michael Cueto
- Jan-Michael Anyayahan
- Victoriano Dueñas
- Mark Ernani Tiu
- Amador Ambrocio Sulit
- Leslee Aguilar

== Lobo Church ==
Lobo Church
- Saint Michael the Archangel Parish Church
- Simbahan ni San Miguel sa Lobo (Filipino)
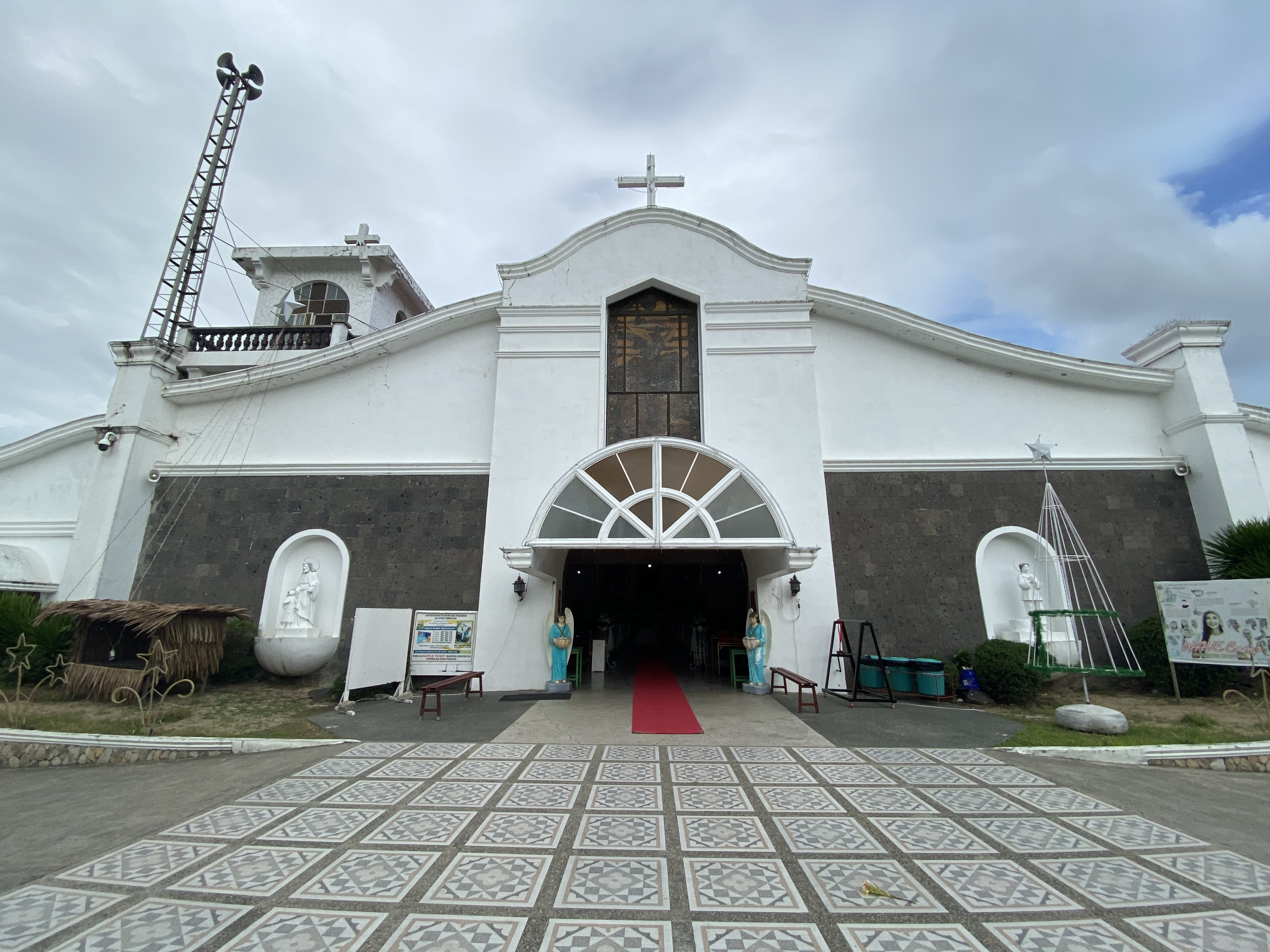
- Church facade in 2024

- Location in Luzon Location in the Philippines
- 13°38′54″N 121°12′35″E
- Denomination: Roman Catholic

History
- Status: Parish church
- Founded: 1873; 153 years ago
- Dedication: Saint Michael the Archangel
- Consecrated: 1987

Architecture
- Functional status: Active
- Style: Neo-classic
- Groundbreaking: 1980; 46 years ago
- Completed: 1986; 40 years ago

Specifications
- Materials: Concrete

Administration
- Archdiocese: Lipa
- Deanery: Immaculate Conception
- Parish: St. Michael the Archangel

Saint Michael the Archangel Parish Church, commonly known as Lobo Church, is a Neo-classic parish church in the municipality of Lobo. The church is under the jurisdiction of the Roman Catholic Archdiocese of Lipa. The parish is dedicated to Saint Michael and its feast day is celebrated every May 8. The church was founded in 1873 while the current building was built in 1980 to 1986.

=== History ===
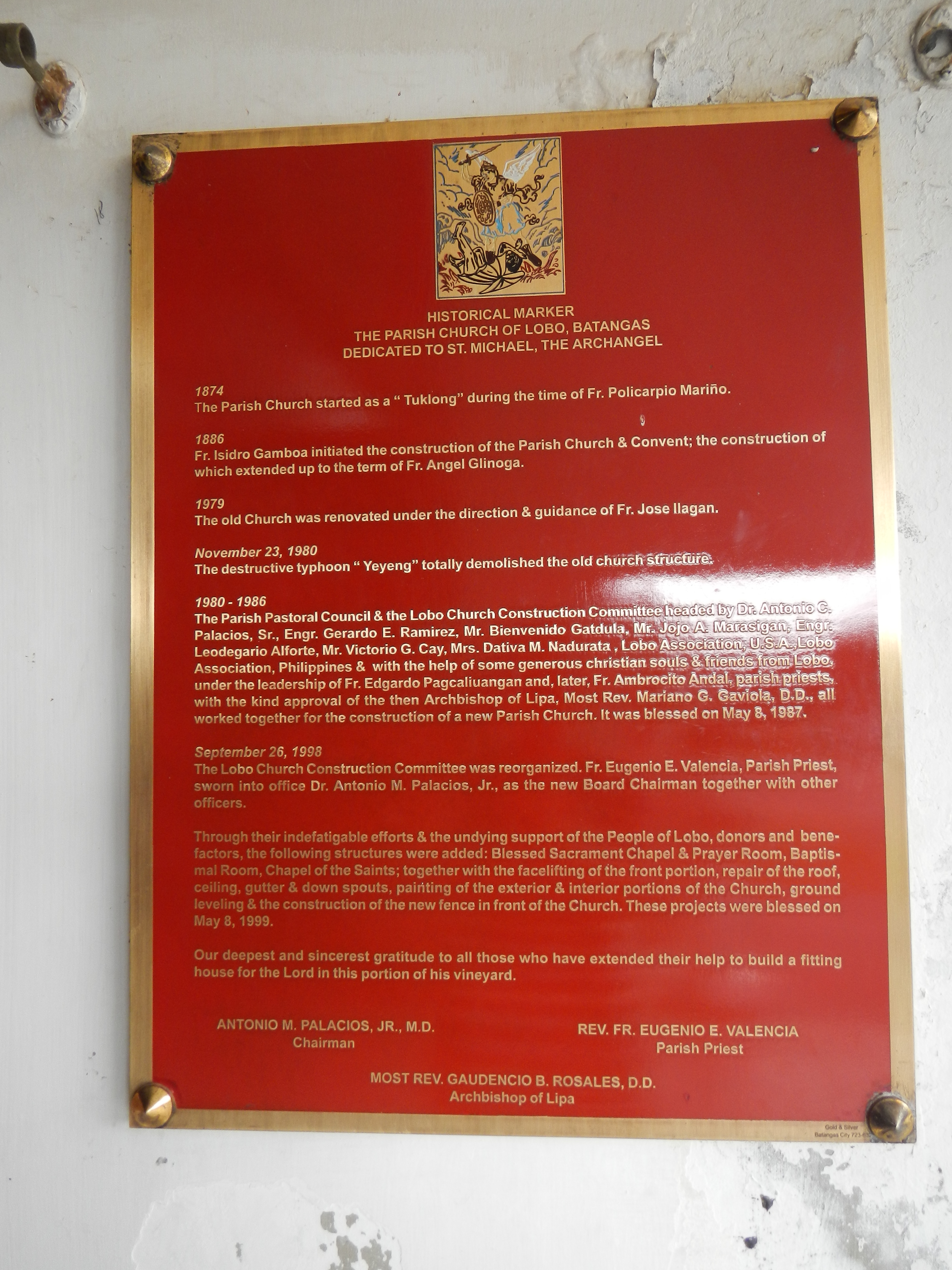
Church marker installed at the entrance of the church

In March 1871, Lobo, a visita under the jurisdiction of Taysan, and its residents requested the Governor-General for the visita to be an independent town and its parish due to reasons of long walking distance and difficult travel to the mother town. On September 27, 1871, the visita with the barrios of Masagitsit, Tayuman, Bignay, Malapad na Parang, Mabilog na Bundok, Malabrigo, and Sabana was made into a town. Still, the request to the parish was temporarily suspended until the church, the convent, and a school were adequately built.

On November 20, 1872, the King of Spain approved the request to build the parish and on February 4, 1873, the Governor, Viceroy of the Philippine Islands, enacted the king's order, formally founding the parish. The parish started as a tuklong made from bamboo and cogon in 1874, then it was built into a church and a convent made of wood and bamboo in 1886, initiated by Fr. Isidro Gamboa. The parish was administered by Augustinian Recollect friars until 1902.

When the Diocese of Lipa was made in 1910, the parish was given to a Belgian priest, Fr. Raymundo Esquinet, along with the parishes of San Jose, Ibaan, Bauan, Taysan, Cuenca, and Tombol. In 1915, the parish was given to the OSJ missionaries along with Taysan's parish, Nuestra Señora de la Merced Parish Church. The parish was under the guidance of the congregation until 1917.

In 1979, the church was renovated into a concrete building but was destroyed by Typhoon Yeyeng in 1981. A temporary chapel was made to continue parish activities. Five years later, the parish church was completely rebuilt and was blessed in 1987.

== Fish sanctuaries ==
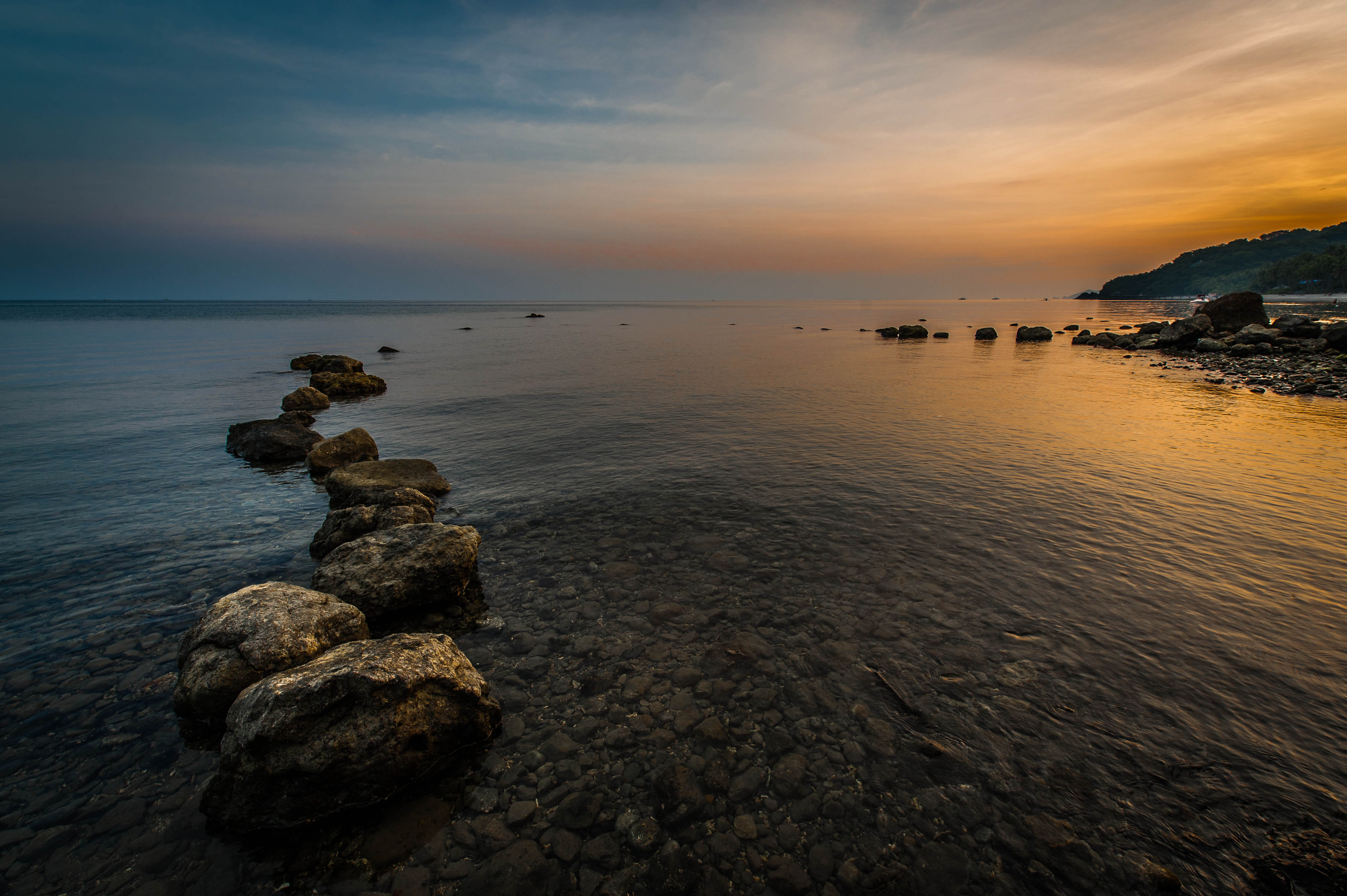
Lobo seashore

Lobo has several fish sanctuaries:

- Lobo Mangrove Conservation Area
- Sawang and Olo-Olo Fish Sanctuary and Refuge Area
- Malabrigo Fish Sanctuary and Refuge Area
- Biga Fish Sanctuary and Refuge Area

== Education ==
The Lobo Schools District Office governs all educational institutions within the municipality. It oversees the management and operations of all private and public, from primary to secondary schools.

=== Primary and elementary schools ===
- Apar Elementary School
- Balatbat Elementary School
- Balibago Elementary School
- Banalo Elementary School
- Biga Elementary School
- Bignay Primary School
- Calo Elementary School
- Calumpit Elementary School
- Jaybanga Elementary School
- Lagadlarin/Olo-Olo Elementary School
- Lobo Elementary School
- Mabilog Na Bundok Elementary School
- Malabrigo Elementary School
- Malapad Na Parang Elementary School
- Masaguitsit Elementary School
- Nagtaluntong Elementary School
- Nagtoctoc Elementary School
- Pinaghawanan Elementary School
- Punas Elementary School
- San Miguel Elementary School
- San Nicolas Elementary School
- Sawang Elementary School
- Soloc Elementary School
- St. Michael the Archangel Parochial School

=== Secondary schools ===
- Balibago-Biga National High School
- Basilio S. Marasigan Memorial National High School
- Jaybanga Integrated National High School
- Lobo Institute
- Lobo Senior High School
- Lord Immanuel Institute Foundation
- Malabrigo National High School
- Malapad na Parang National High School
- Masaguitsit Banalo National High School

== Gallery ==
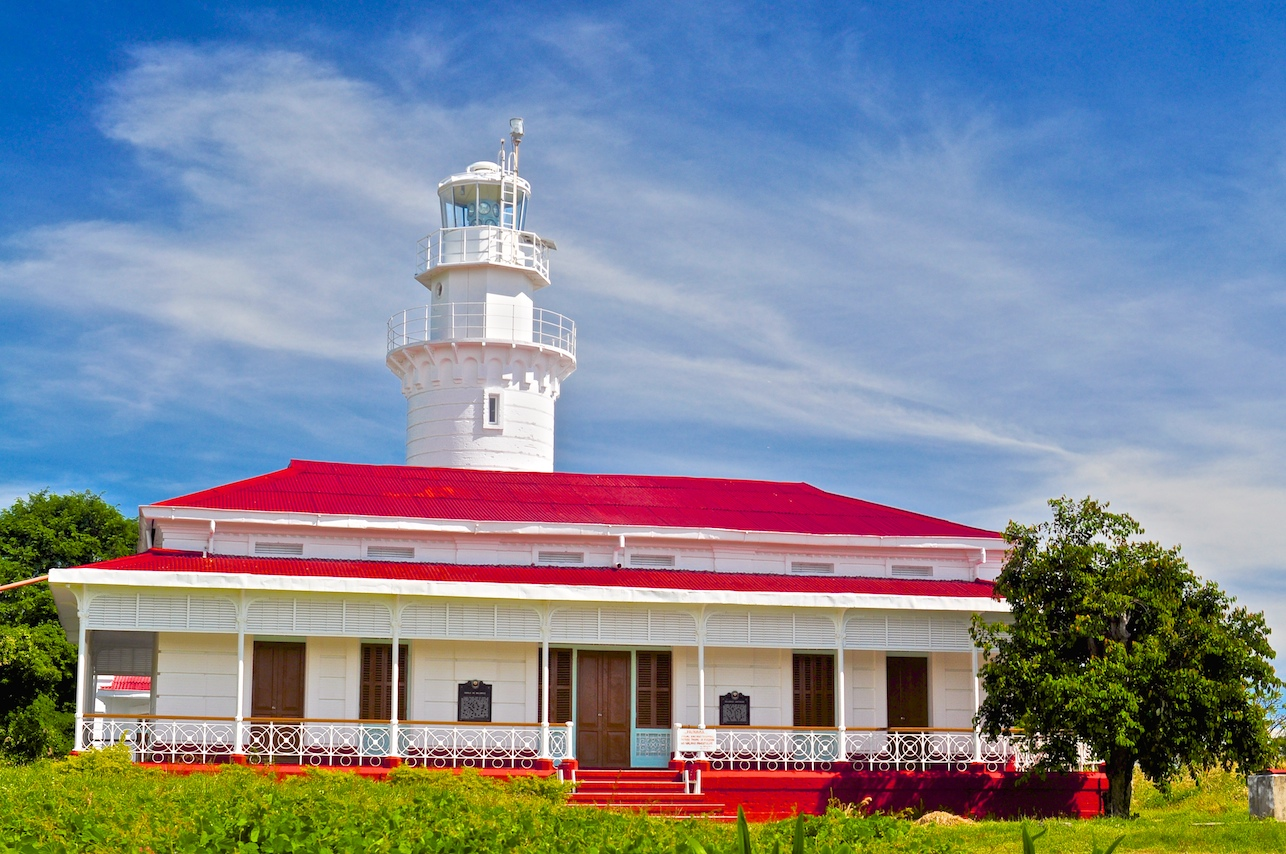
Malabrigo Point Lighthouse

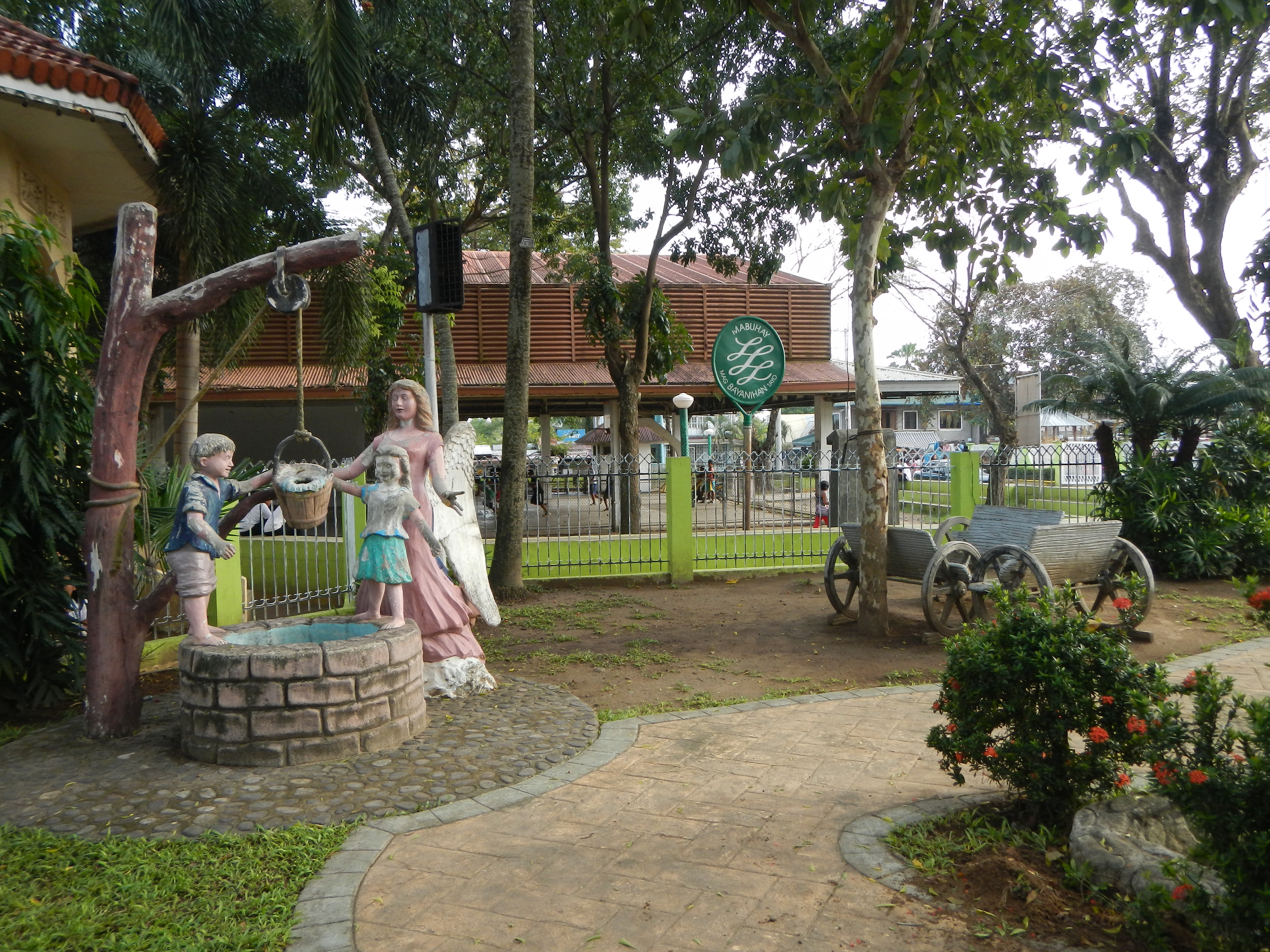
Park

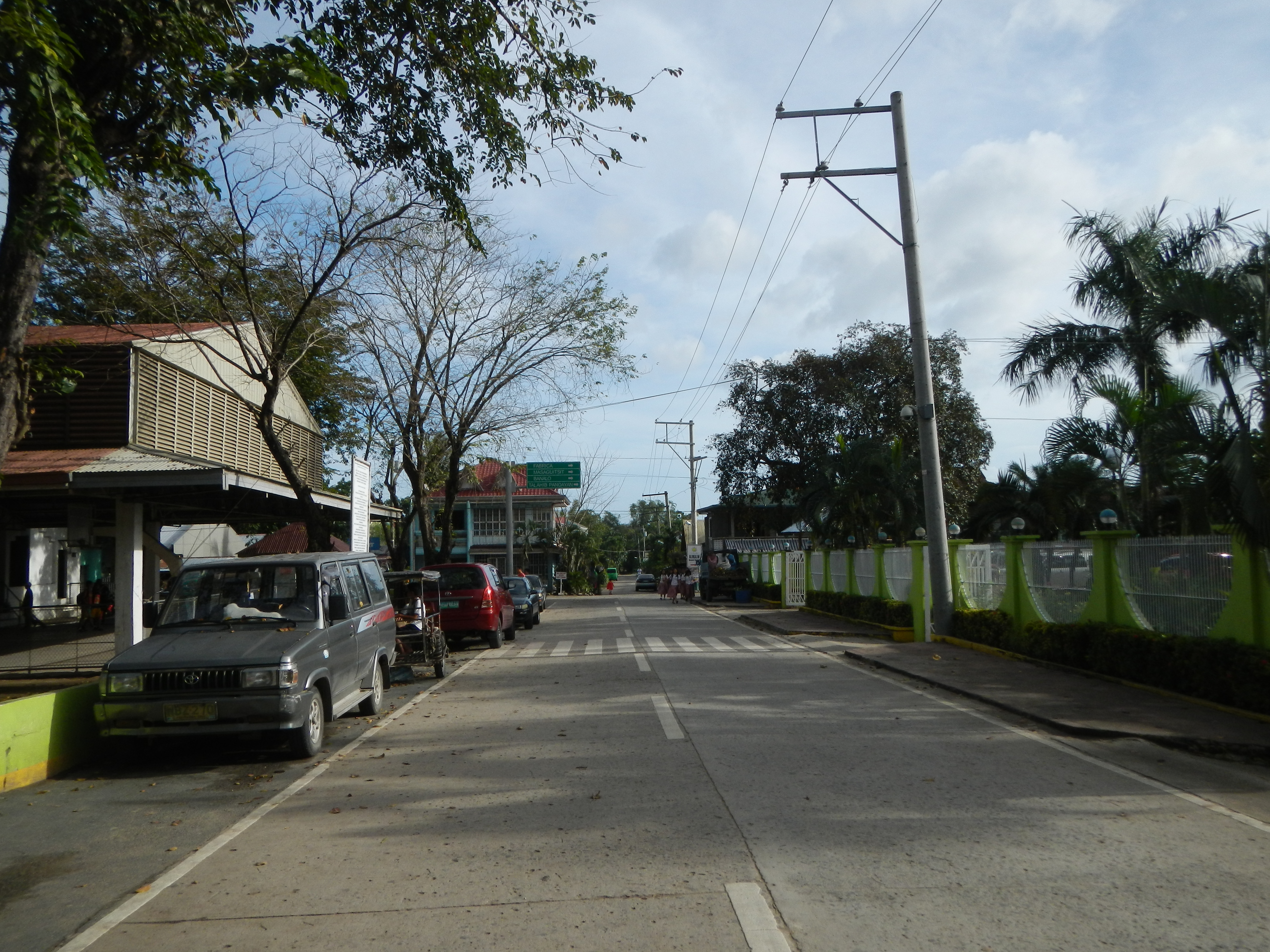
Downtown Lobo

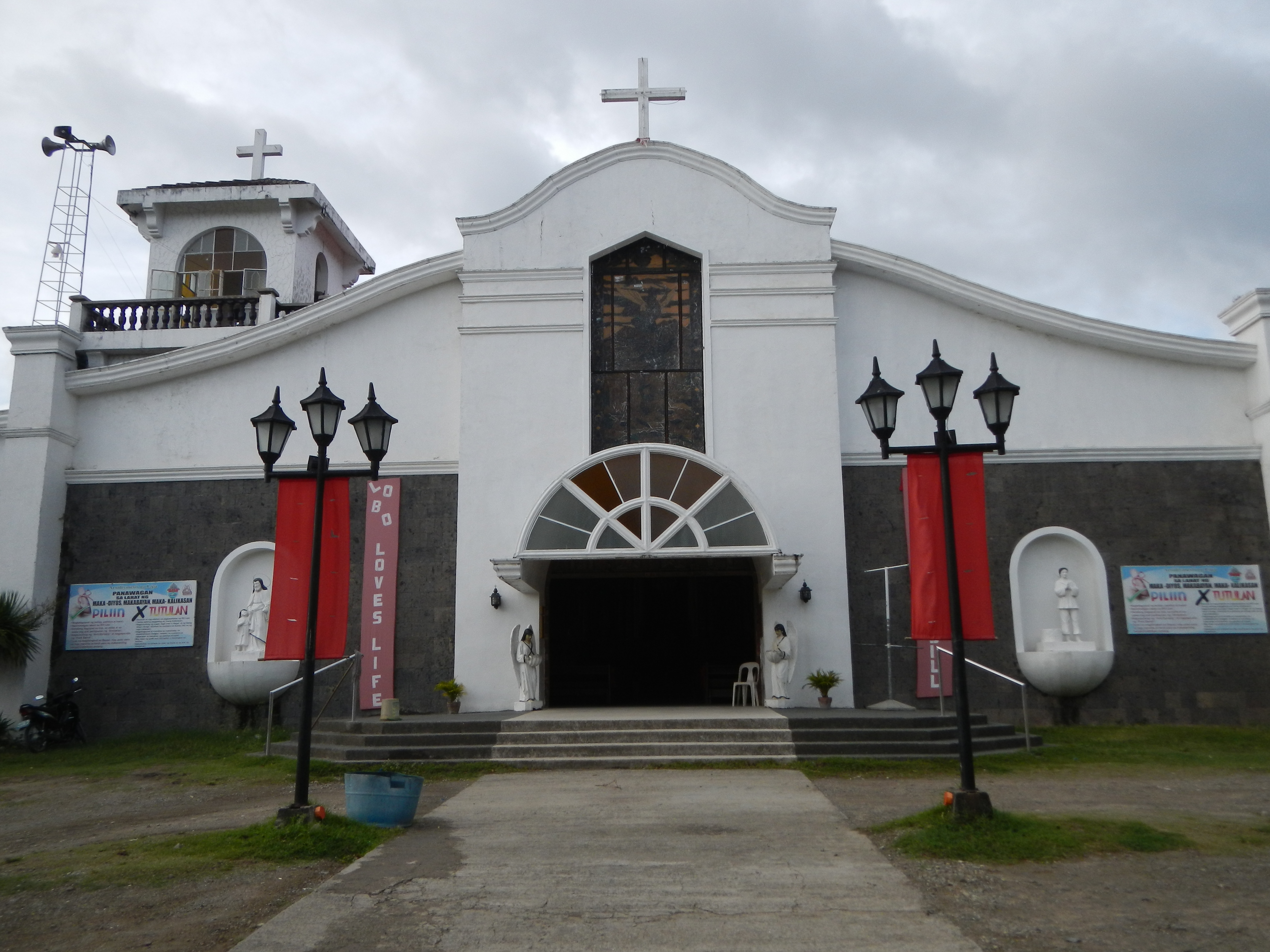
Saint Michael the Archangel Parish Church
