= Taysan =

Municipality in Batangas, Philippines

- Municipality
- Municipality of Taysan
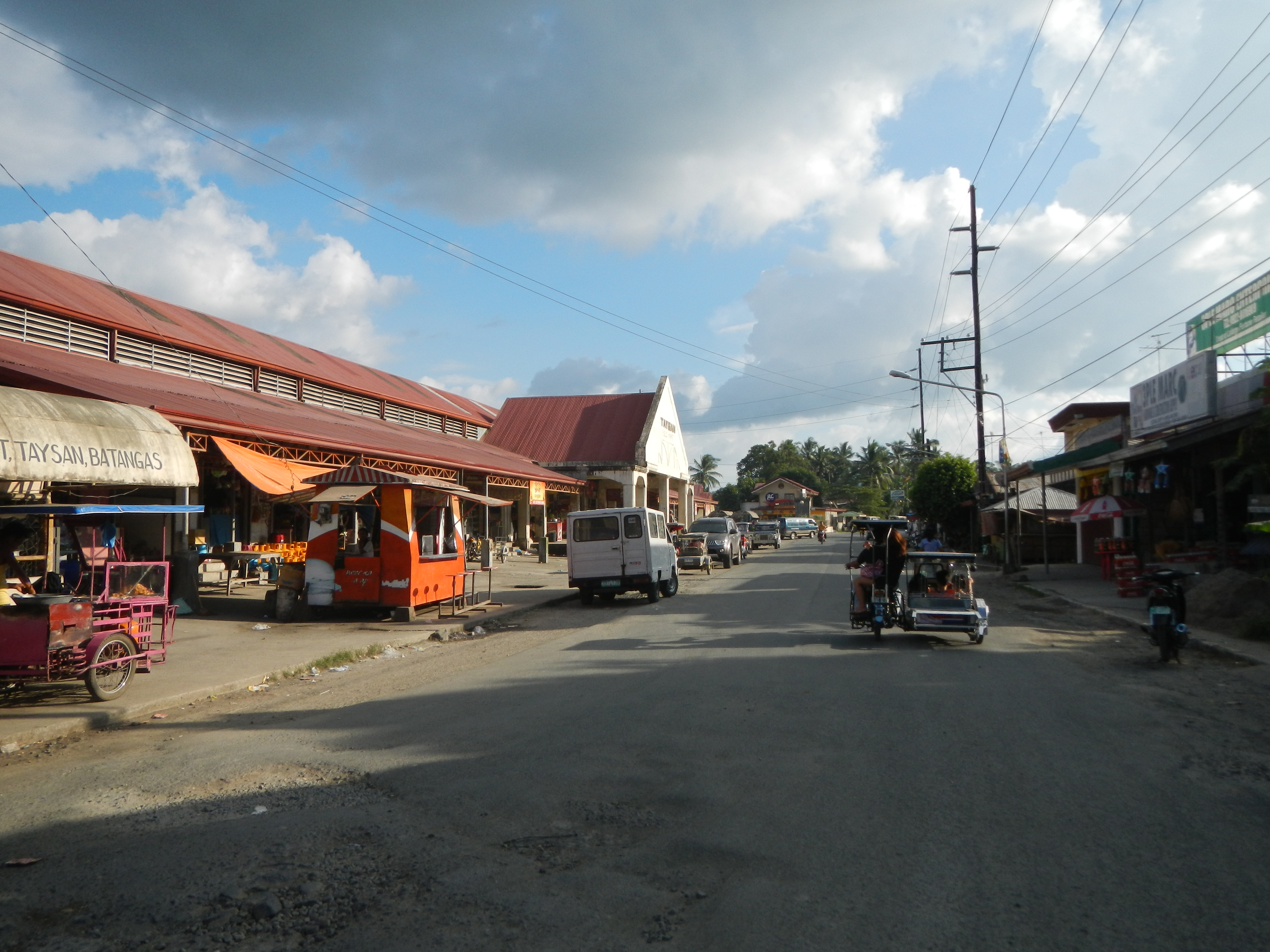
- Downtown

- Seal

- Map of Batangas with Taysan highlighted
- Interactive map of Taysan
- Location within the Philippines
- Coordinates: 13°47′N 121°12′E
- Country: Philippines
- Region: Calabarzon
- Province: Batangas
- District: 4th district
- Founded/Chartered: 1919
- Barangays: 20 (see Barangays)

Government
  - Type: Sangguniang Bayan
  - Mayor: Brigido A. Villena
  - Vice Mayor: Eloisa Angela D. Portugal
  - Representative: Amado Carlos A. Bolilia IV
  - Municipal Council: Members: Grande P. Gutierrez; Nelson M. Macaraig; Joel P. Portugal; Mark Anthony B. Arcega; Dave G. Batarao; Rollie B. Delos Reyes; Clint M. Bosch; Danilo M. Africa
  - Electorate: 30,000 voters (2025)

Area
  - Total: 93.62 km^{2} (36.15 sq mi)
- Elevation: 196 m (643 ft)
- Highest elevation: 977 m (3,205 ft)
- Lowest elevation: 31 m (102 ft)

Population (2024 census)
  - Total: 41,332
  - Density: 441.5/km^{2} (1,143/sq mi)
  - Households: 9,735

Economy
  - Income class: 1st municipal income class
  - Poverty incidence: 9.83% (2023)
  - Revenue: ₱ 246.9 million (2024)
  - Assets: ₱ 624.4 million (2024)
  - Expenditure: ₱ 148.9 million (2024)
  - Liabilities: ₱ 108.6 million (2024)

Service provider
  - Electricity: Batangas 2 Electric Cooperative (BATELEC 2)
- Time zone: UTC+8 (PST)
- ZIP code: 4228
- PSGC: 0401032000
- IDD : area code: +63 (0)43
- Native languages: Tagalog

Taysan, officially the Municipality of Taysan (Tagalog: Bayan ng Taysan), is a municipality in the province of Batangas, Philippines. According to the 2024 census, it has a population of 41,332 people.

It is known for its array of specialty street foods, particularly those served on skewers. Among the popular offerings are barbeque, bananacue, corn, kwek-kwek, hotdog, and grilled milkfish, which have become local favorites and a staple of the town’s culinary culture.

== Etymology ==
Taysan may have derived its name from the following Tagalog words:

- Atisan, which means "a place where atis abound nearing Lobo."
- Tiis, which translates to "to bear with fortitude," as early natives experienced hardships during their entry and stay at the area due to its remote location accessible through many river crossings and dangerous trails, according to a folklore. A traveler also shouted "Tiisan!" (Tagalog for endure) on the way to the area, sticking to it until it is called Taisan or Taysan.

== History ==
Taysan traces its origin to Mercedes, a barrio now part of Rosario. It was later converted into a municipality known as Taysan, according to Manuel Sastrón's 1895 publication Batangas y Su Provincia. Lobo was consolidated with it in 1903 but was merged with Rosario in the same year. Taysan was officially made an independent municipality in 1919.

== Geography ==
Taysan is located at 13°47′N 121°12′E.

According to the Philippine Statistics Authority, the municipality has a land area of 93.62 square kilometers (36.15 sq mi) constituting 3.00% of the 3,119.75-square-kilometer (1,204.54 sq mi) total area of Batangas.

Taysan is bordered on the north by Rosario and Ibaan, east by a portion of Rosario, west by Batangas City, and south by Lobo.

=== Barangays ===
Taysan is politically subdivided into 20 barangays, as shown in the matrix below. Each barangay consists of puroks and some have sitios.

PSGC	Barangay	Population			±% p.a.	
		2024		2010		
041032001	Bacao	2.2%	918	970	▾	−0.38%
041032002	Bilogo	5.4%	2,252	2,070	▴	0.59%
041032003	Bukal	3.8%	1,554	1,448	▴	0.49%
041032004	Dagatan	7.4%	3,078	2,667	▴	1.00%
041032005	Guinhawa	3.2%	1,327	1,194	▴	0.74%
041032006	Laurel	4.2%	1,739	1,658	▴	0.33%
041032007	Mabayabas	5.5%	2,264	2,072	▴	0.62%
041032008	Mahanadiong	4.6%	1,908	1,741	▴	0.64%
041032009	Mapulo	7.5%	3,084	2,850	▴	0.55%
041032010	Mataas na Lupa	3.5%	1,452	1,540	▾	−0.41%
041032011	Pag‑Asa	6.0%	2,468	2,293	▴	0.51%
041032012	Panghayaan	3.1%	1,286	1,230	▴	0.31%
041032013	Piña	3.7%	1,525	1,462	▴	0.29%
041032014	Pinagbayanan	6.4%	2,625	2,310	▴	0.89%
041032015	Poblacion East	2.0%	846	818	▴	0.23%
041032016	Poblacion West	2.4%	976	901	▴	0.56%
041032017	San Isidro	6.2%	2,581	2,401	▴	0.50%
041032018	San Marcelino	4.4%	1,807	1,700	▴	0.42%
041032019	Santo Niño	6.1%	2,501	2,303	▴	0.57%
041032020	Tilambo	4.4%	1,816	1,729	▴	0.34%
	Total		41,332	35,357	▴	1.09%

=== Climate ===
Climate data for Taysan, Batangas
Month	Jan	Feb	Mar	Apr	May	Jun	Jul	Aug	Sep	Oct	Nov	Dec	Year
Mean daily maximum °C (°F)	26 (79)	27 (81)	29 (84)	31 (88)	31 (88)	30 (86)	29 (84)	28 (82)	28 (82)	28 (82)	28 (82)	26 (79)	28 (83)
Mean daily minimum °C (°F)	20 (68)	20 (68)	20 (68)	21 (70)	23 (73)	24 (75)	24 (75)	23 (73)	23 (73)	22 (72)	22 (72)	21 (70)	22 (71)
Average precipitation mm (inches)	52 (2.0)	35 (1.4)	27 (1.1)	27 (1.1)	82 (3.2)	124 (4.9)	163 (6.4)	144 (5.7)	145 (5.7)	141 (5.6)	100 (3.9)	102 (4.0)	1,142 (45)
Average rainy days	12.0	8.1	8.8	9.7	17.9	22.6	26.2	24.5	24.6	22.0	16.7	14.9	208
Source: Meteoblue

== Demographics ==
Population census of Taysan
Year	Pop.	±% p.a.
1903	3,386	—
1939	8,526	+2.60%
1948	10,318	+2.14%
1960	11,750	+1.09%
1970	14,999	+2.47%
1975	17,075	+2.63%
1980	19,370	+2.55%
1990	22,508	+1.51%
1995	26,504	+3.11%
2000	29,836	+2.57%
2007	33,454	+1.59%
2010	35,357	+2.03%
2015	38,007	+1.39%
2020	40,146	+1.16%
2024	41,332	+0.70%
Source: Philippine Statistics Authority

In the 2024 census, Taysan had a population of 41,332 people. The population density was 440 inhabitants per square kilometer (1,100/sq mi).

== Economy ==
Poverty incidence of Taysan (%)

Source: Philippine Statistics Authority

== Education ==
The Taysan Schools District Office governs all educational institutions within the municipality. It oversees the management and operations of all private and public, from primary to secondary schools.

=== Primary and elementary schools ===
- Bacao Elementary School
- Bilogo Elementary School
- Bucal Elementary School
- Conde Elementary School
- Dagatan Adventist Elementary School
- Dagatan Elementary School
- Guinhawa Elementary School
- Mabayabas Elementary School
- Mapulo Elementary School
- Mataas na Lupa Elementary School
- Our Lady of Mercy Academy
- Paaralang Elementarya ng Laurel
- Paaralang Elementarya ng San Isidro
- Pag-asa Elementary School
- Panghayaan Elementary School
- Pinagbayanan Elementary School
- Piña Elementary School
- San Marcelino Elementary School
- Sto. Nino Elementary School
- Taysan Central School
- Tilambo Elementary School

=== Secondary schools ===
- Bilogo Integrated National High School
- Dagatan National High School
- Mahanadiong National High School
- Pinagbayanan Integrated National High School
- San Isidro National High School
- Taysan High School & Child Development Center
- Taysan Senior High School
- Tilambo National High School

== Gallery ==
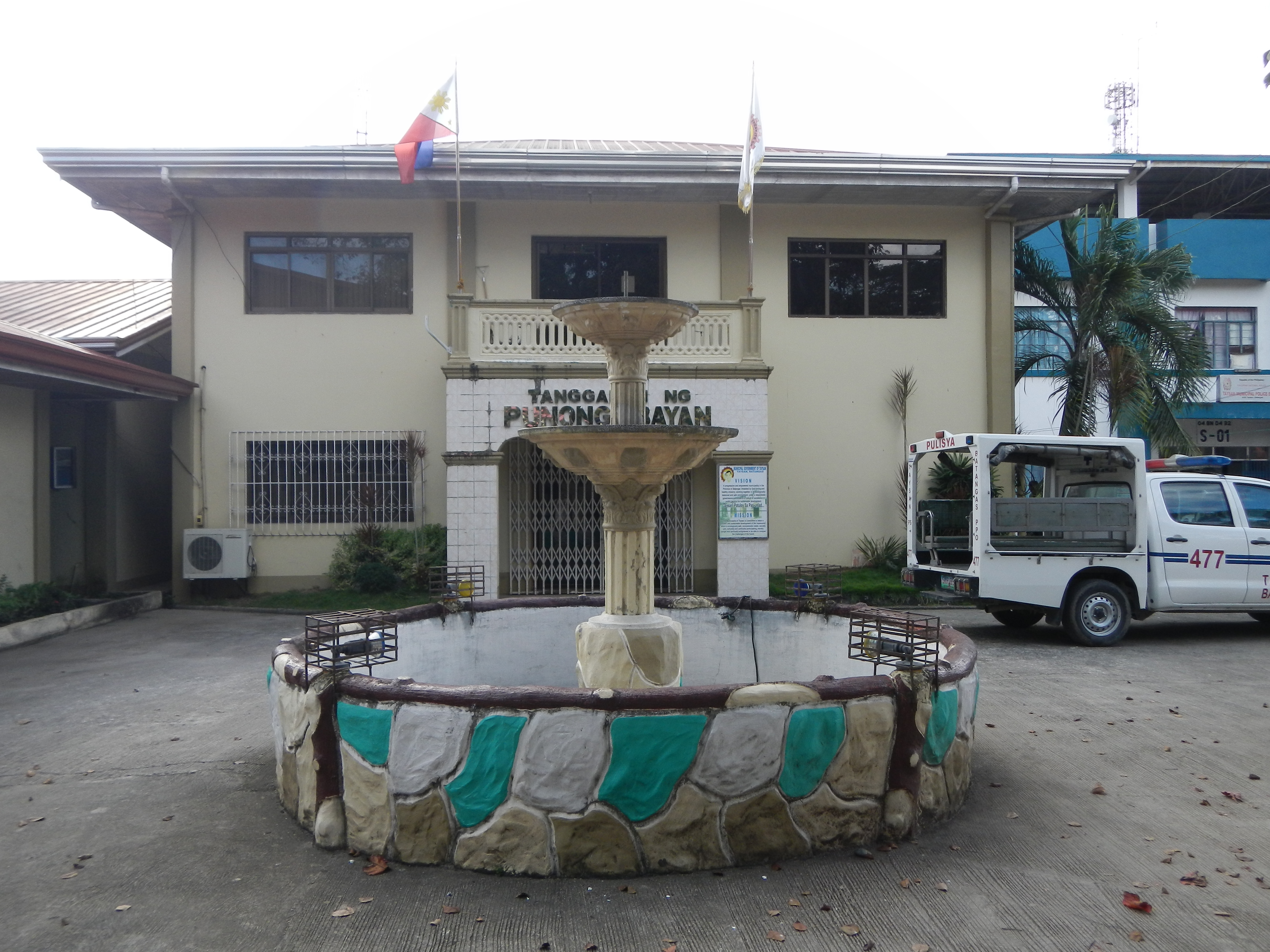
Municipal hall

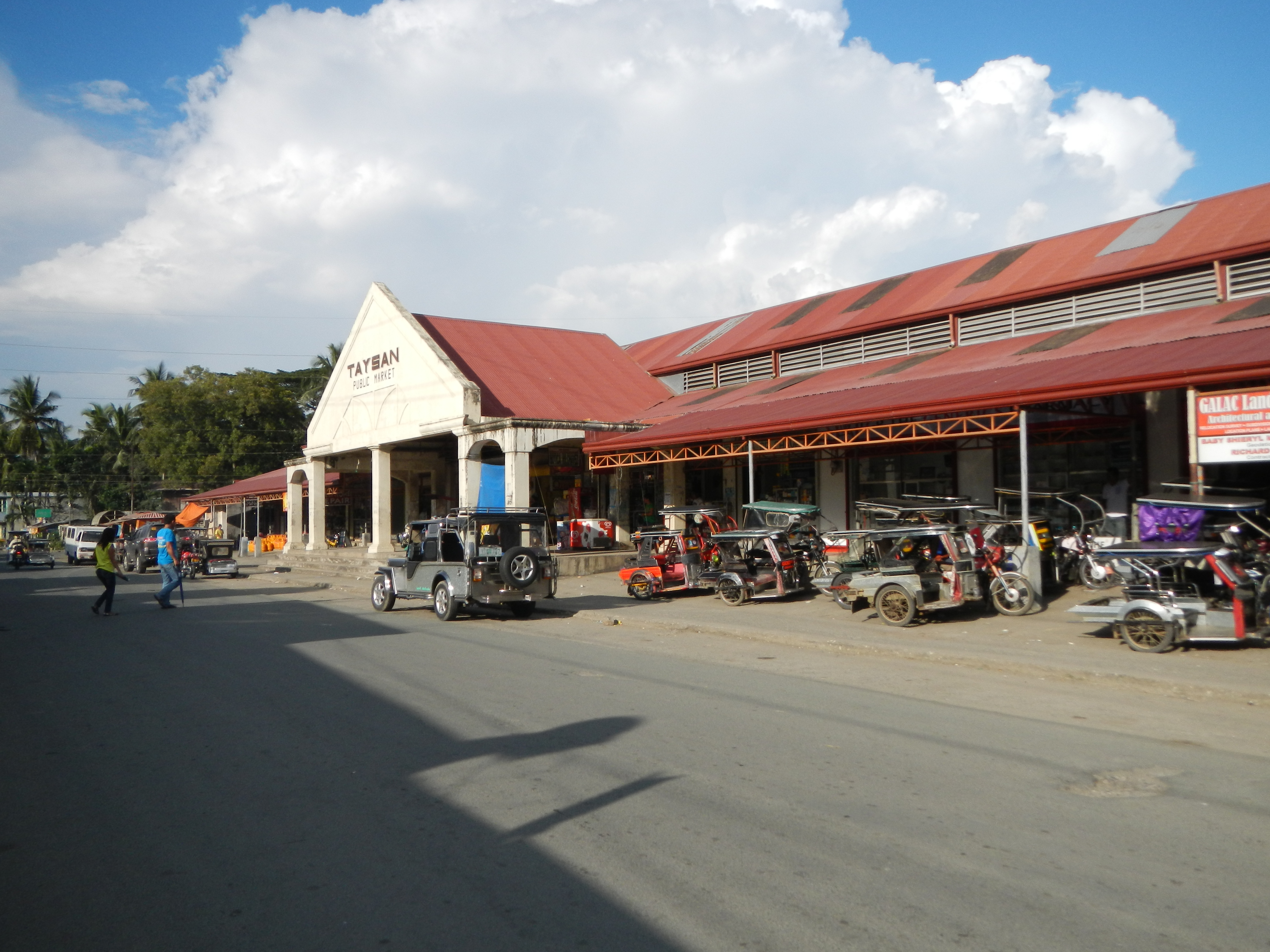
Public market

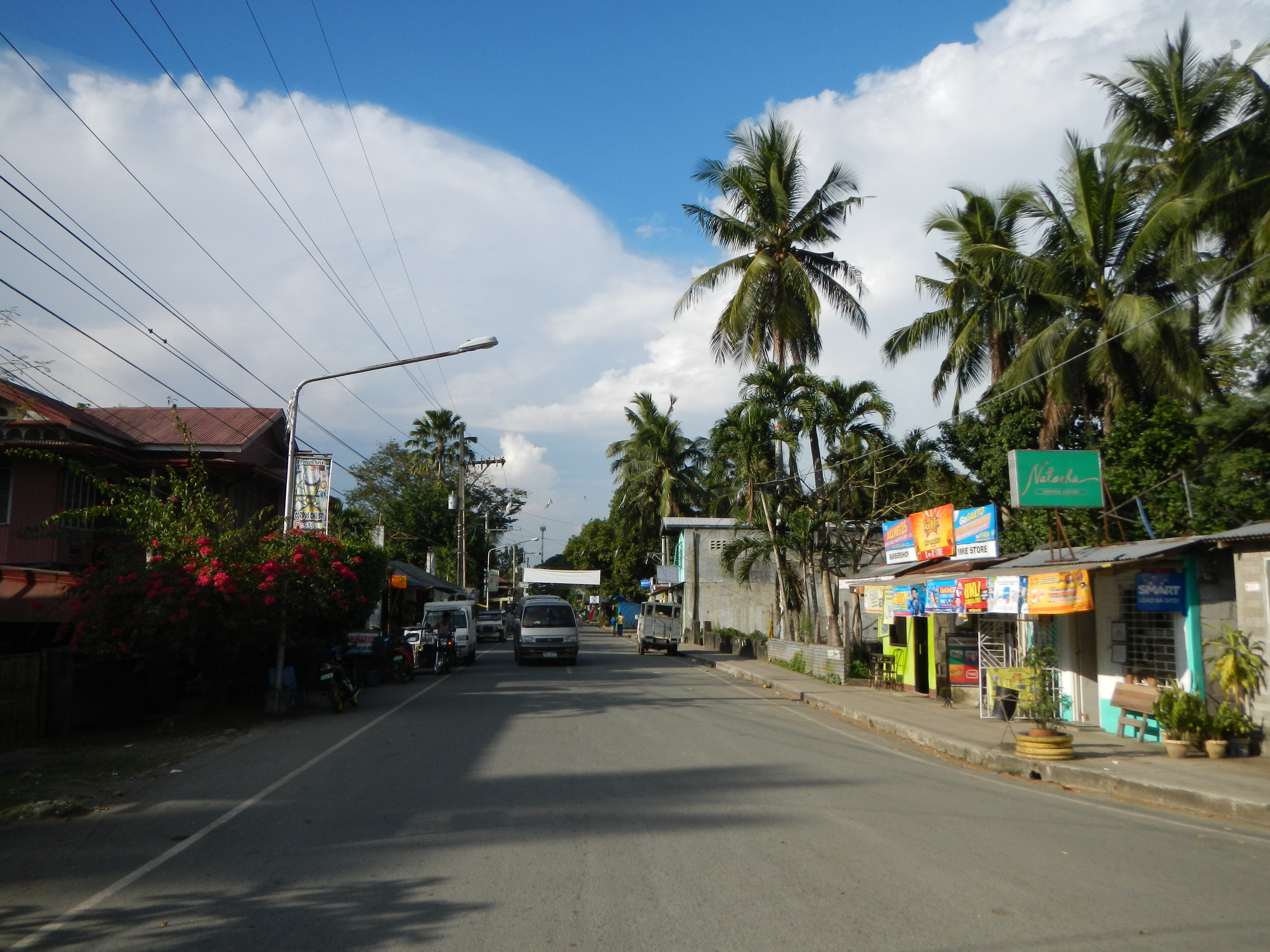
A street in town

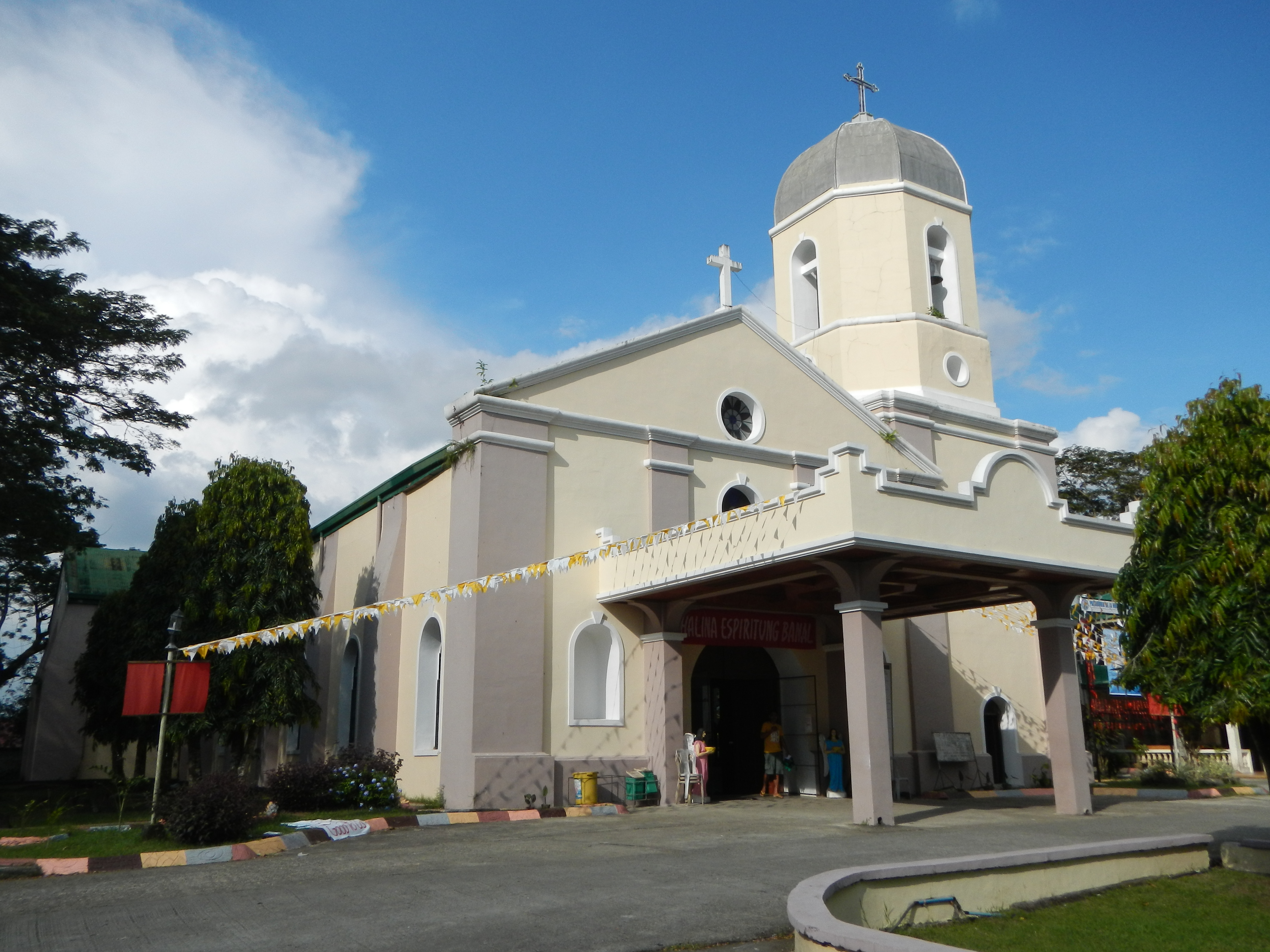
Nuestra Señora dela Merced Parish Church
