= 2025 Batangas local elections =

Part of the 2025 Philippine general election

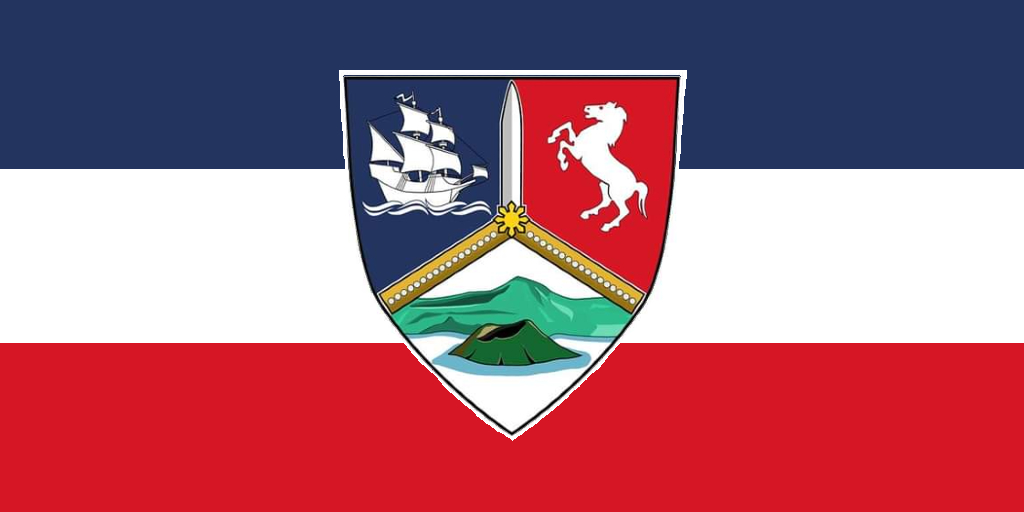
- May 12, 2025
- Gubernatorial election
- Registered: 1,958,794▲7.68 pp
- Turnout: 79.45% (▲5.66 pp)
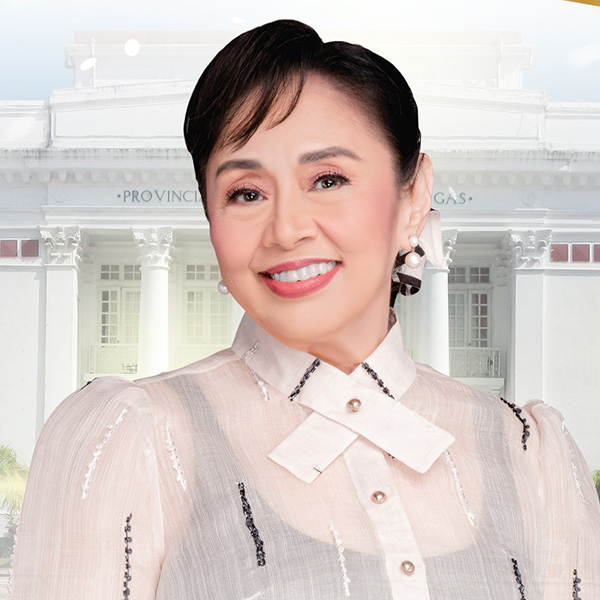

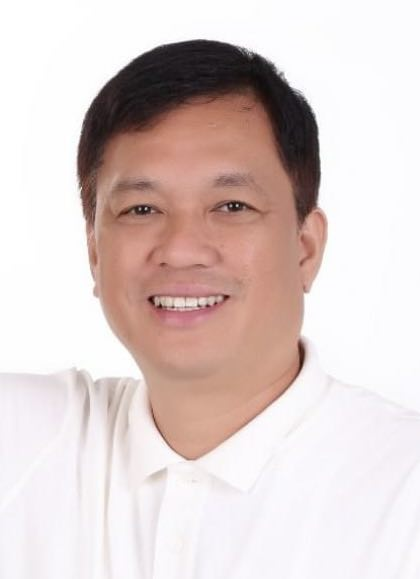

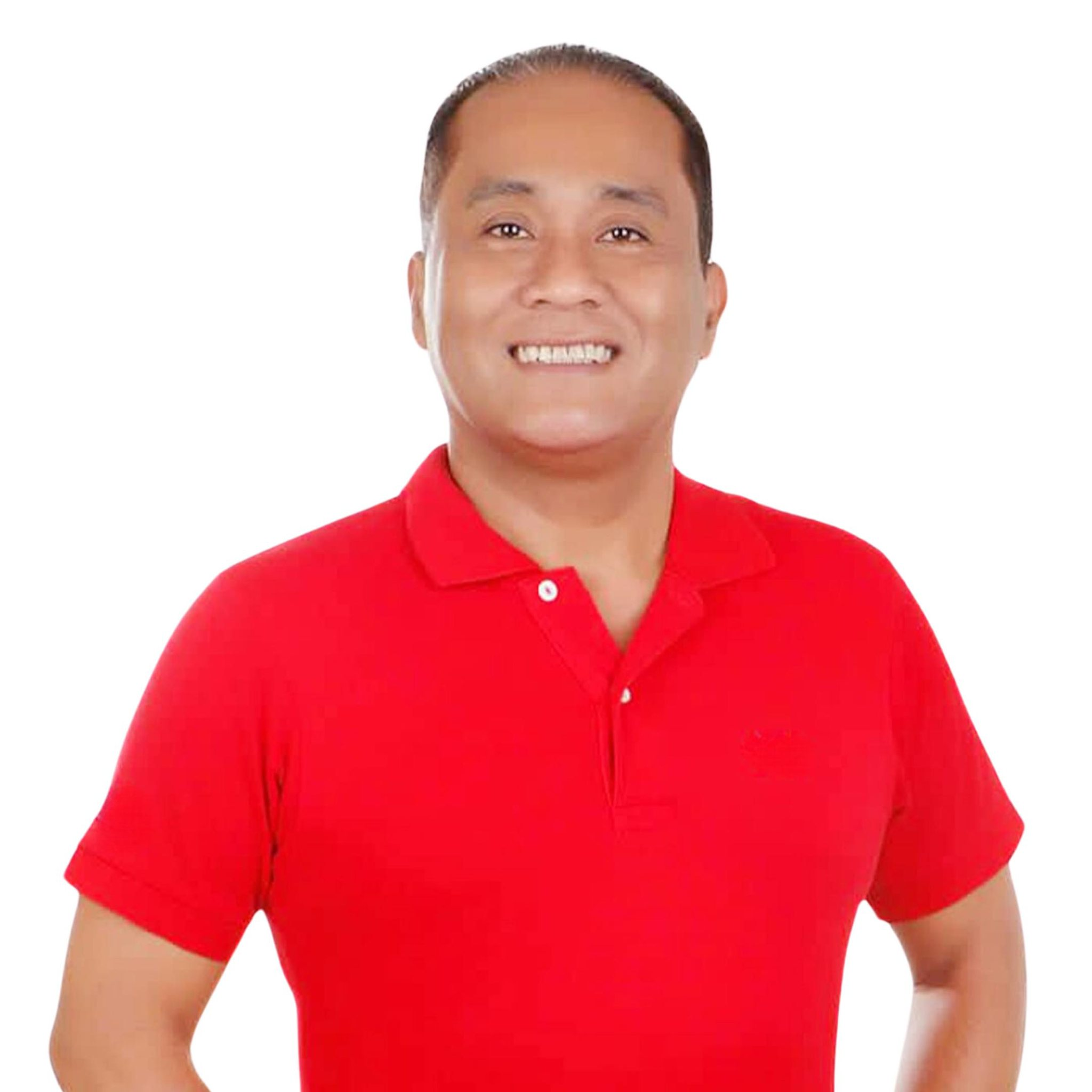

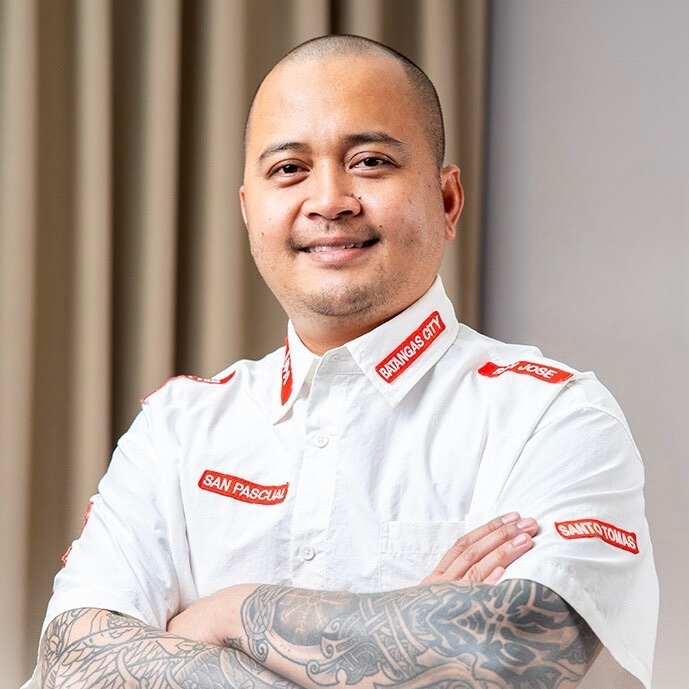
Candidate	Vilma Santos	Michael Angelo C. Rivera	Jay Manalo Ilagan
Party	Nacionalista	Liberal	PROMDI
Running mate	Luis Manzano	Hermilando Mandanas (PDP)
Popular vote	655,034	532,531	272,677
Percentage	42.10	34.22	17.52
Candidate	Walter Ozaeta
Party	Independent
Popular vote	95,946
Percentage	6.16
Governor before election
Hermilando Mandanas
PDP
Elected Governor
Vilma Santos
Nacionalista
- Vice Gubernatorial election
- Turnout: 77.27% (▲5.1 pp)
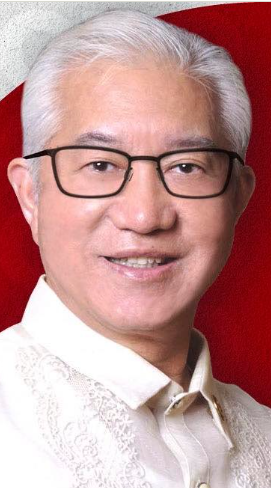

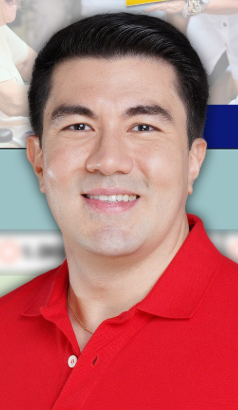

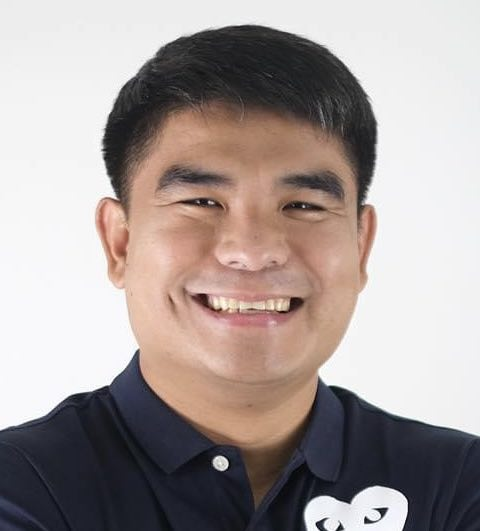
Candidate	Hermilando Mandanas	Luis Manzano	Ryanh Dolor
Party	PDP	Nacionalista	Independent
Popular vote	821,380	565,077	127,036
Percentage	54.29	37.32	8.39
Vice Governor before election
Mark Leviste
PDP
Elected Vice Governor
Hermilando Mandanas
PDP

Local elections were held in the province of Batangas on May 12, 2025, as part of the 2025 general election. Voters will select candidates for all local positions: a town mayor, vice mayor and town councilors, as well as members of the Sangguniang Panlalawigan, the vice-governor, governor and representatives for the six districts of Batangas.

== Background ==
Incumbent governor Hermilando Mandanas who was elected in 2016 and has served his third consecutive (sixth non-consecutive term) as governor and is ineligible for reelection.

Among those who announced their intention for the governorship is incumbent Mataasnakahoy Vice Mayor Jay Ilagan. Former party-list representative of 1st Consumer Alliance for Rural Energy (1-CARE) and former mayor of Padre Garcia Michael Angelo Rivera also expressed his intention to run for governor. Another candidate is Walter Ozaeta, currently captain of Barangay Poblacion IV, San Jose; he was endorsed by the Partido Federal ng Pilipinas as its gubernatorial candidate. Actress and former governor Vilma Santos-Recto also filed her certificate of candidacy for governor. Vilma Santos-Recto once served as governor of Batangas from 2007 to 2016.

All single-winner positions in contention use first-past-the-post voting, while all multi-winner positions use plurality block voting. The positions in contention, as well as the quantity of each position, are as follows:

District	Municipality or City	Representatives	Governor	Vice Governor	Members of the Sangguniang Panlalawigan	Mayor	Vice Mayor	Members of the Sangguniang Panlungsod or Sangguniang Bayan
1st	Calaca	1	1	1	2	1	1	10
1st	Balayan	1	1	1	2	1	1	8
1st	Calatagan	1	1	1	2	1	1	8
1st	Lemery	1	1	1	2	1	1	8
1st	Lian	1	1	1	2	1	1	8
1st	Nasugbu	1	1	1	2	1	1	8
1st	Taal	1	1	1	2	1	1	8
1st	Tuy	1	1	1	2	1	1	8
2nd	Bauan	1	1	1	2	1	1	8
2nd	Lobo	1	1	1	2	1	1	8
2nd	Mabini	1	1	1	2	1	1	8
2nd	San Luis	1	1	1	2	1	1	8
2nd	San Pascual	1	1	1	2	1	1	8
2nd	Tingloy	1	1	1	2	1	1	8
3rd	Santo Tomas, Batangas	1	1	1	2	1	1	10
3rd	Tanauan	1	1	1	2	1	1	10
3rd	Agoncillo	1	1	1	2	1	1	8
3rd	Alitagtag	1	1	1	2	1	1	8
3rd	Balete	1	1	1	2	1	1	8
3rd	Cuenca	1	1	1	2	1	1	8
3rd	Laurel	1	1	1	2	1	1	8
3rd	Malvar	1	1	1	2	1	1	8
3rd	Mataasnakahoy	1	1	1	2	1	1	8
3rd	San Nicolas	1	1	1	2	1	1	8
3rd	Santa Teresita	1	1	1	2	1	1	8
3rd	Talisay	1	1	1	2	1	1	8
4th	Ibaan	1	1	1	2	1	1	8
4th	Padre Garcia	1	1	1	2	1	1	8
4th	Rosario	1	1	1	2	1	1	8
4th	San Jose	1	1	1	2	1	1	8
4th	San Juan	1	1	1	2	1	1	8
4th	Taysan	1	1	1	2	1	1	8
5th	Batangas City	1	1	1	2	1	1	12
6th	Lipa	1	1	1	2	1	1	12

== Provincial elections ==
=== Governor ===
Incumbent Governor Hermilando Mandanas is term-limited and is running for Vice Governor. Running for the position are incumbent Mataasnakahoy Vice Mayor Jay Ilagan, barangay captain Walter Ozaeta, former 1-CARE partylist representative and former Padre Garcia mayor Michael Angelo Rivera and former governor Vilma Santos-Recto.

2025 Batangas gubernatorial election
Candidate	Party	Votes	%
Vilma Santos-Recto	Nacionalista Party	655,034	42.09
Michael Angelo Rivera	Liberal Party	532,531	34.22
Jay Ilagan	PROMDI	272,677	17.52
Walter Ozaeta	Independent	95,946	6.17
Total		1,556,188	100.00
Nacionalista gain from PDP			

2025 Batangas Gubernatorial Election Results

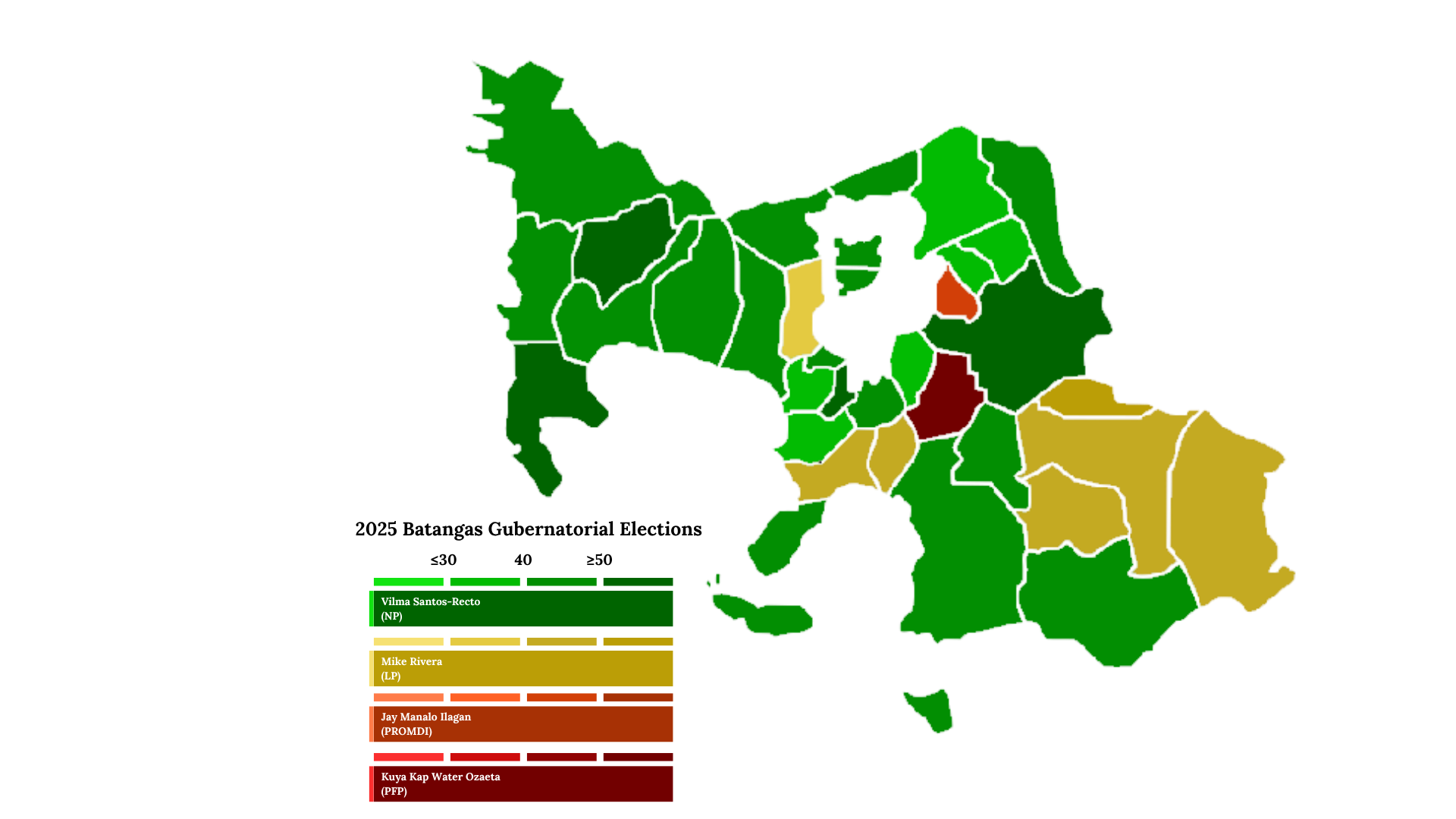
Results by municipality and city

==== Per City/Municipality ====
City/Municipality	Vilma Santos-Recto		Michael Angelo Rivera		Jay Ilagan		Walter Ozaeta	
City/Municipality	Votes	%	Votes	%	Votes	%	Votes	%
Agoncillo	7,123	33.24	7,135	33.29	6,000	28.00	1,174	5.48
Alitagtag	6,420	43.74	4,557	31.05	3,290	22.42	419	2.79
Balayan	20,341	41.32	6,829	15.41	2,529	5.71	426	0.96
Balete	4,848	39.56	2,558	20.87	3,773	30.79	1,075	8.77
Batangas City	76,393	42.40	71,921	39.91	23,548	13.07	8,381	4.65
Bauan	12,854	26.80	20,610	42.97	12,688	26.45	1,813	3.78
Calaca	22,371	35.03	15,157	23.76	12,824	22.24	1,321	2.56
Calatagan	17,616	57.15	5,690	18.52	4,997	16.27	2,415	7.86
Cuenca	7,780	36.87	7,470	35.40	4,215	19.97	1,639	7.77
Ibaan	14,601	42.53	13,769	40.10	3,635	10.59	2,328	6.78
Laurel	10,068	42.76	7,197	30.56	5,494	23.33	788	3.35
Lemery	19,323	40.67	14,318	30.13	11,910	25.06	1,966	4.14
Lian	12,922	43.87	7,785	26.43	6,656	22.60	2,093	7.11
Lipa	119,708	58.18	58,582	28.47	23,509	11.43	3,951	1.92
Lobo	11,532	48.38	8,037	33.72	2,658	11.15	1,607	6.74
Mabini	13,547	48.44	9,241	33.04	4,431	15.84	748	2.67
Malvar	10,767	35.71	10,022	33.24	5,242	17.39	4,121	13.67
Mataasnakahoy	8,634	44.78	1,631	8.46	8,634	44.78	113	0.59
Nasugbu	33,065	48.63	18,031	26.52	15,061	22.15	1,840	2.71
Padre Garcia	2,523	8.52	26,368	89.07	513	1.73	201	0.68
Rosario	25,411	36.27	34,153	48.74	7,623	10.88	2,881	4.11
San Jose	12,717	24.30	8,235	15.73	3,522	6.73	27,863	53.24
San Juan	22,757	37.95	27,231	45.41	5,986	9.98	3,992	6.66
San Luis	8,667	39.22	7,936	35.91	4,894	22.15	601	2.72
San Nicolas	5,833	46.52	2,777	22.15	3,490	27.84	438	3.49
San Pascual	9,547	27.00	16,009	45.27	8,060	22.79	1,747	4.94
Santa Teresita	6,494	57.82	1,476	13.14	3,112	27.71	150	1.34
Santo Tomas	39,626	42.28	33,367	35.60	16,617	17.73	4,121	4.40
Taal	10,396	32.97	10,206	32.37	9,326	29.58	1,599	5.07
Talisay	11,007	45.47	6,340	26.19	4,713	19.47	2,147	8.87
Tanauan	44,439	70.97	42,601	36.10	23,869	20.22	7,114	6.03
Taysan	8,817	36.71	11,739	48.87	2,871	11.95	593	2.47
Tingloy	3,186	40.10	1,872	23.56	2,551	32.10	337	4.24
Tuy	13,701	56.02	6,367	26.03	3,725	15.23	664	2.71
TOTAL	655,034	42.09	532,531	35.50	272,677	17.52	95,946	6.17

=== Vice Governor ===
Incumbent Mark Leviste who has declared his intention for the governorship decided to run for congress. His party nominated incumbent governor Hermilando Mandanas. His opponents are incumbent Bauan mayor Ryanh Dolor and TV host Luis Manzano, son of former governor Vilma Santos.

2025 Batangas vice gubernatorial election
Candidate	Party	Votes	%
Hermilando Mandanas	PDP	821,380	54.27
Luis Manzano	Nacionalista Party	565,077	37.34
Ryanh Dolor	Independent	127,036	8.39
Total		1,513,493	100.00
PDP hold			

2025 Batangas Vice Gubernatorial Election Results

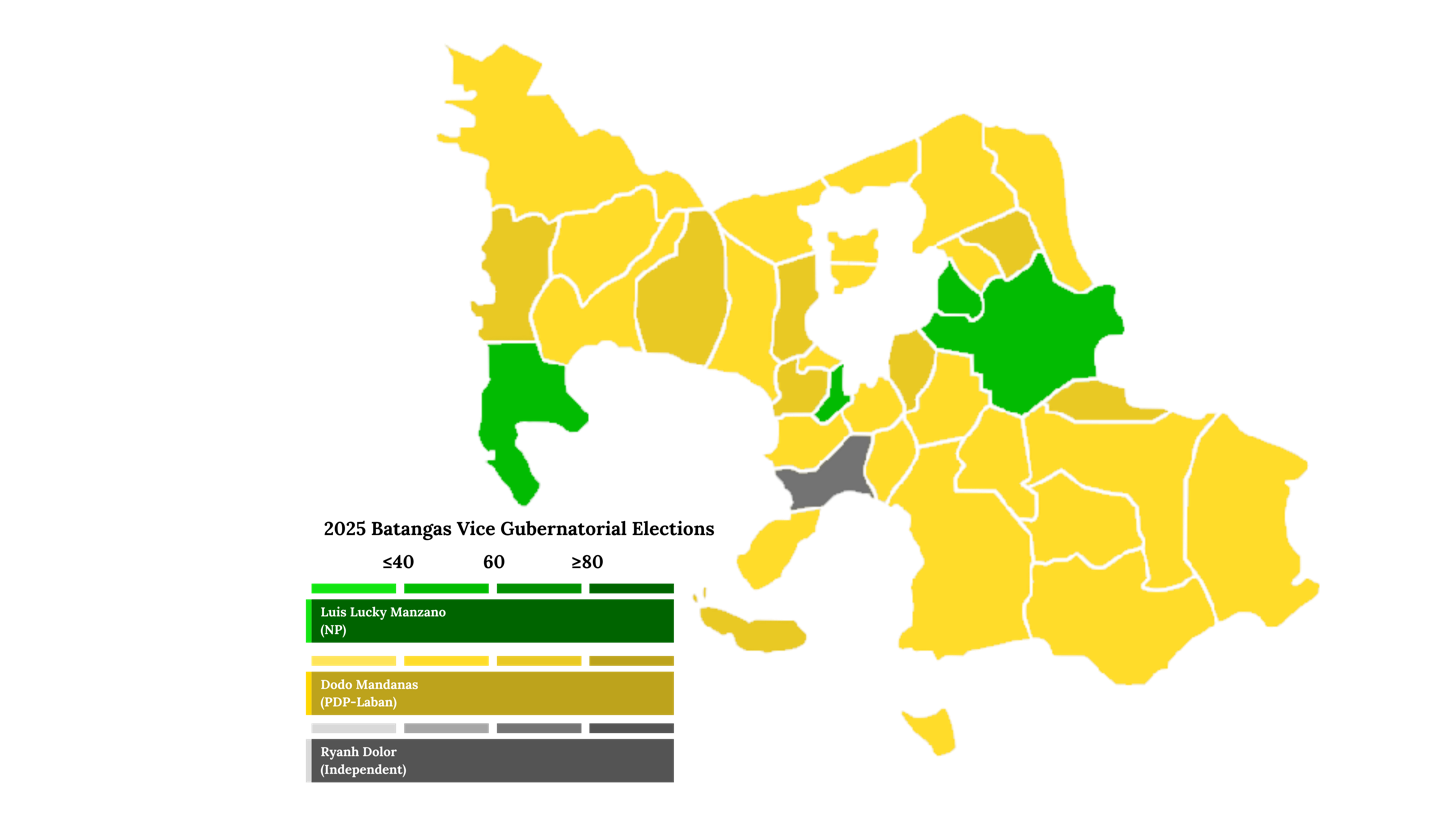
Results by municipality and city

==== Per City/Municipality ====
City/Municipality	Dodo Mandanas		Luis "Lucky" Manzano		Ryanh Dolor	
City/Municipality	Votes	%	Votes	%	Votes	%
Agoncillo	13,537	65.43	5,905	28.54	1,246	6.02
Alitagtag	7,261	51.08	5,436	38.24	1,518	10.68
Balayan	26,178	55.19	17,486	37.13	3,428	7.20
Balete	7,091	59.92	4,471	37.78	273	2.31
Batangas City	102,772	57.68	60,944	34.20	14,468	8.12
Bauan	13,113	25.94	6,830	13.51	30,616	60.55
Calaca	32,251	63.00	17,013	33.35	1,858	3.63
Calatagan	13,032	44.05	14,925	50.45	1,628	5.50
Cuenca	12,347	61.28	6,435	31.94	1,368	6.79
Ibaan	19,428	57.71	13,003	38.62	1,235	3.67
Laurel	12,662	56.51	9,236	41.22	510	2.28
Lemery	26,028	56.03	14,923	32.12	5,502	11.84
Lian	18,555	64.41	9,258	32.14	994	3.45
Lipa	94,266	47.25	96,807	48.52	8,436	4.23
Lobo	13,058	41.55	11,346	40.11	5,186	18.34
Mabini	11,752	41.55	11,346	40.11	5,186	18.34
Malvar	17,969	61.83	9,436	32.47	1,656	5.70
Mataasnakahoy	8,732	47.69	8,851	48.34	727	3.97
Nasugbu	36,693	55.33	27,198	41.01	2,425	3.66
Padre Garcia	20,865	77.28	5,231	19.38	902	3.34
Rosario	37,552	55.63	27,449	40.66	2,508	3.72
San Jose	25,049	53.12	18,448	39.12	3,658	7.76
San Juan	30,914	53.69	24,516	42.58	2,151	3.74
San Luis	12,866	59.09	6,425	29.51	2,481	11.40
San Nicolas	6,165	50.48	5,404	44.25	644	5.27
San Pascual	16,269	45.98	6,939	19.61	12,171	34.40
Santa Teresita	5,120	46.33	5,404	48.90	526	4.76
Santo Tomas	52,680	57.94	33,157	36.47	5,090	5.60
Taal	20,821	67.10	7,640	24.62	2,569	8.28
Talisay	12,369	52.79	10,022	42.77	1,041	4.44
Tanauan	64,170	56.59	43,333	38.21	5,893	5.20
Taysan	12,080	53.09	9,302	40.88	1,373	6.03
Tingloy	4,763	60.26	2,558	32.74	553	7.00
Tuy	12,592	52.31	10,684	44.38	796	3.31
TOTAL	821,380	54.29	565,077	37.32	127,036	8.39

2025 Batangas vice gubernatorial election by locality
Dist.	Locality	Registered voters	Total district registered voters	Candidates			Total votes	Non-voters / Invalid	Turnout	Vote share		
Dist.	Locality	Registered voters	Total district registered voters	Dodo Mandanas	Luis Lucky Manzano	Ryanh Dolor	Total votes	Non-voters / Invalid	Turnout	Mandanas	Manzano	Dolor
1	Calaca	63,857	419,735	32,251	17,013	1,858	51,122	12,735	80.06%	63.09%	33.28%	3.63%
1	Balayan	59,821	419,735	26,178	17,486	3,428	47,092	12,729	78.72%	55.59%	37.13%	7.28%
1	Calatagan	38,196	419,735	13,032	14,925	1,628	29,585	8,613	77.45%	44.05%	50.45%	5.50%
1	Lemery	59,437	419,735	26,028	14,923	5,502	46,453	12,984	78.16%	56.03%	32.12%	11.84%
1	Lian	37,493	419,735	18,555	9,258	994	28,807	8,686	76.83%	64.41%	32.14%	3.45%
1	Nasugbu	89,379	419,735	36,693	27,198	2,425	66,316	23,063	74.20%	55.33%	41.01%	3.66%
1	Taal	40,453	419,735	20,821	7,640	2,569	31,030	9,423	76.71%	67.10%	24.62%	8.28%
1	Tuy	31,097	419,735	12,592	10,684	796	24,072	7,025	77.41%	52.31%	44.38%	3.31%
2	Bauan	60,835	208,308	13,113	6,830	30,616	50,559	10,276	83.11%	25.94%	13.51%	60.55%
2	Lobo	29,032	208,308	13,058	8,962	1,606	23,626	5,406	81.38%	55.27%	37.93%	6.80%
2	Mabini	35,913	208,308	11,752	11,346	5,186	28,284	7,629	78.76%	41.55%	40.11%	18.34%
2	San Luis	26,877	208,308	12,866	6,425	2,481	21,772	5,105	81.01%	59.09%	29.51%	11.40%
2	San Pascual	44,264	208,308	16,269	6,939	12,171	35,379	8,885	79.93%	45.98%	19.61%	34.40%
2	Tingloy	11,385	208,308	4,763	2,558	553	7,874	3,511	69.16%	60.49%	32.49%	7.02%
3	Santo Tomas City	124,836	515,378	52,680	33,157	5,090	90,927	33,909	72.84%	57.94%	36.47%	5.60%
3	Tanauan City	151,400	515,378	64,170	43,333	5,893	113,396	38,004	74.90%	56.59%	38.21%	5.20%
3	Agoncillo	27,383	515,378	13,537	5,905	1,246	20,688	6,695	75.55%	65.43%	28.54%	6.02%
3	Alitagtag	19,249	515,378	7,261	5,436	1,518	14,215	5,034	73.85%	51.08%	38.24%	10.68%
3	Balete	15,206	515,378	7,091	4,471	273	11,835	3,371	77.83%	59.92%	37.78%	2.31%
3	Cuenca	25,742	515,378	12,347	6,435	1,368	20,150	5,592	78.28%	61.28%	31.94%	6.79%
3	Laurel	28,925	515,378	12,662	9,236	510	22,408	6,517	77.47%	56.51%	41.22%	2.28%
3	Malvar	39,256	515,378	17,969	9,436	1,656	29,061	10,195	74.03%	61.83%	32.47%	5.70%
3	Mataasnakahoy	22,311	515,378	8,732	8,851	727	18,310	4,001	82.07%	47.69%	48.34%	3.97%
3	San Nicolas	16,051	515,378	6,165	5,404	644	12,213	3,838	76.09%	50.48%	44.25%	5.27%
3	Santa Teresita	14,295	515,378	5,120	5,404	526	11,050	3,245	77.30%	46.33%	48.90%	4.76%
3	Talisay	30,724	515,378	12,369	10,022	1,041	23,432	7,292	76.27%	52.79%	42.77%	4.44%
4	Ibaan	41,301	329,711	19,428	13,003	1,235	33,666	7,635	81.51%	57.71%	38.62%	3.67%
4	Padre Garcia	34,545	329,711	20,865	5,231	902	26,998	7,547	78.15%	77.28%	19.38%	3.34%
4	Rosario	85,045	329,711	37,552	27,449	2,508	67,509	17,536	79.38%	55.63%	40.66%	3.72%
4	San Jose	62,236	329,711	25,049	18,448	3,658	47,155	15,081	75.77%	53.12%	39.12%	7.76%
4	San Juan	76,584	329,711	30,914	24,516	2,151	57,581	19,003	75.19%	53.69%	42.58%	3.74%
4	Taysan	30,000	329,711	12,080	9,302	1,373	22,755	7,245	75.85%	53.09%	40.88%	6.03%
5	Batangas City	228,263	228,263	102,772	60,944	14,468	178,184	50,079	78.06%	57.68%	34.20%	8.12%
6	Lipa City	257,401	257,401	94,266	96,807	8,436	199,509	57,892	77.51%	47.25%	48.52%	4.23%
Total		1,958,744	—	821,380	565,077	127,036	1,513,493	184,179	77.27%	54.29%	37.32%	8.39%

=== Provincial board ===
Party	Votes	%	Seats
Nacionalista Party	1,447,209	64.23	10
Independent	282,790	12.55	1
Lakas–CMD	169,747	7.53	0
Laban ng Demokratikong Pilipino	127,648	5.67	0
Nationalist People's Coalition	126,139	5.60	1
PROMDI	58,213	2.58	0
Partido Federal ng Pilipinas	41,440	1.84	0
Ex officio seats			3
Total	2,253,186	100.00	15

==== 1st District - (1987 - Present) ====
- City: Calaca
- Municipalities: Balayan, Calatagan, Lemery, Lian, Nasugbu, Taal, Tuy

Incumbent Roman Rosales Jr. is term-limited. Incumbent Armie Bausas is eligible for a second-term.

2025 Provincial Board Election in 1st District of Batangas
Party	Candidate	Votes	%
Nacionalista	Anna Rosales Santos	150,934	29.86
Nacionalista	Armie Bausas	133,519	26.41
LDP	Raymund Apacible	127,648	25.25
PROMDI	Leo Malinay	58,213	11.51
PFP	Roberto Landicho	35,138	6.95
Total votes		505,512	100.00

==== 2nd District - (2016 - Present) ====
- Municipalities: Bauan, Lobo, Mabini, San Luis, San Pascual, Tingloy

Incumbents Wilson Leandro Rivera and Arlina Magboo are term-limited. The Nacionalista Party has nominated two candidates: Jently Ona Rivera, wife of Wilson Rivera, and Dr. Reina Abu-Reyes, daughter of former Congressman Raneo Abu. Challenging them are term-limited Mabini councilor Richard Dieza, former board member Amelia Alvarez, Ramon Lagrana and Andro Hernandez.

2025 Provincial Board Election in 2nd District of Batangas
Party	Candidate	Votes	%
Nacionalista	Reina Abu-Reyes	86,228	29.16
Nacionalista	Jently Rivera	72,470	24.51
Lakas	Rolan Richard Dieza	67,328	22.77
Lakas	Amelia Alvarez	60,211	20.36
PFP	Ramon Lagrana	6,302	2.13
Independent	Andro Hernandez	3,173	1.07
Total votes		295,712	100.00

Party	Candidate	2nd District Localities						Total Valid Votes Per Candidate
Party	Candidate	Bauan	Lobo	Mabini	San Luis	San Pascual	Tingloy	Total Valid Votes Per Candidate
Nacionalista	Reina Abu-Reyes	30,443	13,034	11,405	9,453	20,356	1,537	86,228
Nacionalista	Jently Rivera	27,205	10,189	8,759	7,987	17,052	1,278	72,470
Lakas-CMD	Richard Dieza	15,359	7,504	17,809	11,293	12,379	2,984	67,328
Lakas-CMD	Amy Alvarez	14,450	8,241	11,166	9,032	10,901	6,421	60,211
PFP	Ramon Lagrana	2,637	433	749	531	1,260	692	6,302
Independent	Andro Hernandez	740	308	781	641	655	48	3,173
TOTAL VOTES								295,712

==== 3rd District - (1987 - Present) ====
- Cities: Santo Tomas, Tanauan
- Municipalities: Agoncillo, Alitagtag, Balete, Cuenca, Laurel, Malvar, Mataasnakahoy, San Nicolas, Santa Teresita, Talisay

Incumbents Alfredo Corona and Rodolfo Balba are running for re-election.

2025 Provincial Board Election in 3rd District of Batangas
Party	Candidate	Votes	%
Nacionalista	Alfredo Corona	223,928	49.09
Nacionalista	Rodolfo Balba	163,464	45.83
Independent	Dennis Macalintal	68,758	15.07
Total votes		456,150	100.00

==== 4th District - (2016 - Present) ====
- Municipalities: Ibaan, Padre Garcia, Rosario, San Jose, San Juan, Taysan

Incumbents Jonas Patrick Gozos and Jesus De Veyra are term-limited. Running for the position are Melvin Vidal, a three-termer Padre Garcia councilor and outgoing Batangas PCL President, Marcus Mendoza, son of former 4th District representative Mark Mendoza, pastor Eric De Veyra, son of term-limited board member Jesus Del Veyra, incumbent San Jose councilor Jerick Mercado, and three-termer San Juan councilor Alvin Samonte.

2025 Provincial Board Election in 4th District of Batangas
Party	Candidate	Votes	%
NPC	Marcus Dominic Mendoza	126,139	29.83
Independent	Melvin Vidal	106,257	25.12
Nacionalista	Eric De Veyra	92,281	21.82
Independent	Jerick Mercado	49,949	11.81
Independent	Alvin John Samonte	48,279	11.42
Total votes		422,905	100.00

==== 5th District - Lone District (2016 - Present) ====
- City: Batangas City

Incumbents Ma. Claudette Ambida and Arthur Blanco are term-limited in which both will run for the councilor of Batangas City. Former Batangas City vice mayor Jun Berberabe and incumbent city councilor Hamilton Blanco will run for the board member of Batangas. Challenging them are Engr. Vicente Cantos of Lakas and independent candidate Ramil Cueto.

2025 Provincial Board Election in 5th District of Batangas
Party	Candidate	Votes	%
Nacionalista	Emilio Francisco Berberabe Jr.	145,728	49.21
Nacionalista	Hamilton Blanco	101,753	34.37
Lakas	Vicente Cantos	42,208	14.26
Independent	Ramil Cueto	6,374	2.16
Total votes		296,113	100.00

==== 6th District - Lone District (2016 - Present) ====
- City: Lipa

Incumbent Lydio Lopez Jr. is barred from seeking reelection due to term limits and will instead contest a seat in the Lipa City Council. His party has nominated Oscar Gozos II as its replacement candidate for the provincial board seat. Meanwhile, incumbent Aries Emmanuel Mendoza is eligible to run for reelection. Both Gozos and Mendoza are running without opposition.

2025 Provincial Board Election in 6th District of Batangas
Party	Candidate	Votes	%
Nacionalista	Aries Emmanuel Mendoza	146,393	52.87
Nacionalista	Oscar Gozos II	130,515	47.13
Total votes		276,907	100.00

== Congressional elections ==
=== First district ===
Incumbent Eric Buhain is running for reelection. His opponent is businessman Leandro Leviste, son of former governor Jose Antonio Leviste and senator Loren Legarda.

Candidate	Party	Votes	%
Leandro Leviste	Independent politician	268,764	74.58
Eric Buhain (incumbent)	Nacionalista Party	91,588	25.42
Total		360,352	100.00
Registered voters/turnout		419,735	–
Independent gain from Nacionalista Party			
Source: Commission on Elections

=== Second district ===
Incumbent Gerville Luistro is running for reelection. Her opponent is former congressman Raneo Abu.

Candidate	Party	Votes	%
Gerville Luistro (incumbent)	Lakas–CMD	109,478	62.18
Raneo Abu	Nacionalista Party	66,583	37.82
Total		176,061	100.00
Registered voters/turnout		208,306	–
Lakas–CMD hold			
Source: Commission on Elections

=== Third district ===
Incumbent Ma. Theresa Collantes is term-limited. Her son, King is her party's nominee. His opponents are Nestor Burgos and incumbent vice governor Mark Leviste.

Candidate	Party	Votes	%
King Collantes	Nationalist People's Coalition	244,340	61.39
Mark Leviste	Independent politician	143,751	36.12
Nestor Burgos	Independent politician	9,932	2.50
Total		398,023	100.00
Registered voters/turnout		515,378	–
Nationalist People's Coalition hold			
Source: Commission on Elections

=== Fourth district ===
Incumbent Lianda Bolilia is term-limited. Her husband, former board member Amado Carlos "Caloy" Bolilia is her party's nominee. His opponents are incumbent board member Jonas Patrick Gozos and Ronald Umali.

Candidate	Party	Votes	%
Caloy Bolilia	Nacionalista Party	142,884	52.14
JP Gozos	Independent politician	126,636	46.21
Ronald Umali	Lakas–CMD	4,527	1.65
Total		274,047	100.00
Registered voters/turnout		329,711	–
Nacionalista Party hold			
Source: Commission on Elections

=== Fifth District - Batangas City (Capital) ===
Incumbent Marvey Mariño is term-limited and is running for mayor of Batangas City, switching places with his wife, incumbent mayor Beverley Rose Dimacuha. Her opponent is Makabayan Carlito Bisa.

2025 Philippine House of Representatives election in Batangas's 5th District
Party	Candidate	Votes	%
Nacionalista	Beverley Rose Dimacuha	156,049	87.30
Makabayan	Carlito Bisa	22,698	12.70
Total votes		178,747	100.00
Nacionalista hold			

=== Sixth District - Lipa City ===
The seat is currently vacant after Ralph Recto was appointed as Secretary of Finance. Running for the position is his son Ryan Recto, alongside businessman Rodel Lacorte, lawyer Mario Panganiban and Bernadette Sabili, wife of former Lipa City mayor and current Presidential Commission on Urban Poor chief Meynard Sabili.

2025 Election Map of Lipa City for House of Representatives

2025 Philippine House of Representatives election in Batangas's 6th District
Party	Candidate	Votes	%
Nacionalista	Ryan Recto	92,823	45.94
Partido ng Masang Lipeño	Bernadette Sabili	72,976	36.11
Independent	Mario Panganiban	20,872	10.33
Independent	Rodel Lacorte	15,398	7.62
Total votes		202,069	100.00
Nacionalista hold			

== City and municipal elections ==
All 29 municipalities of Batangas, Batangas City, Calaca, Lipa, Santo Tomas, and Tanauan will all elect a mayor and a vice-mayor this election. The candidates for mayor and vice mayor with the highest number of votes wins the seat; they are elected separately, therefore, they may be of different parties when elected. Below is the summary of mayoral and vice-mayoral candidates of each city and municipalities per district.

=== First district ===
- City: Calaca
- Municipalities: Balayan, Calatagan, Lemery, Lian, Nasugbu, Taal, Tuy

==== Calaca City ====
Incumbent Nas Ona is running for reelection. Challenging him is former city vice mayor Renante Macalindong.

Calaca City mayoral elections
Party	Candidate	Votes	%
Nacionalista	Nas Ona	44,253	78.60
Aksyon	Renante Macalindong	12,049	21.40
Total votes		56,302	100.00
Nacionalista hold			

Incumbent Jerry Raphael Katigbak is running for re-election. Challenging him is independent candidate Antonio Mendoza.

Calaca City vice mayoral elections
Party	Candidate	Votes	%
Nacionalista	Jerry Raphael Katigbak	46,993	92.78
PFP	Nonie Mendoza	3,658	7.22
Total votes		50,651	100.00
Nacionalista hold			

Following the ratification of its conversion from a first class municipality to a component city under Republic Act 11544 on September 3, 2022, the number of elected members of Sanggunian was increased from eight to ten councilors.

Calaca City council elections
Party	Candidate	Votes	%
Nacionalista	Cedric De Joya	38,934	60.97
Nacionalista	Sir Deo Ontangco	36,862	57.73
Nacionalista	Emma Dajoyag	36,185	56.67
Nacionalista	Divine Asuncion-Opelanio	35,510	55.61
Nacionalista	Engr RJ Pastoral	32,931	51.57
Nacionalista	Rhosalie Salazar	32,931	51.57
Nacionalista	Robenson Sale	32,239	50.49
Nacionalista	Caesar Ryan Noche	32,058	50.20
Nacionalista	Lindzey Endozo-Atienza	31,390	49.16
Nacionalista	Eric Atajar	30,155	47.22
Aksyon	Chito Macalalad	19,631	30.74
Aksyon	Lilibeth Satin	9,642	15.10
Aksyon	Amando Hernandez	9,262	14.50
Aksyon	Jamie Macalindong	9,001	14.10
Aksyon	Roberto Salazar	8,855	13.87
Aksyon	Marvin Malabanan	8,831	13.83
Aksyon	Mando Macatangay	8,652	13.55
Aksyon	Gimo Hernandez	8,399	13.15
Aksyon	Jun Manalo	7,295	11.42
Aksyon	Nante Reyes	5,997	9.39
Total votes		440,847	100.00
Nacionalista hold			

==== Balayan ====
Incumbent Emmanuel Salvador Fronda II is term-limited. His party nominated his wife, Leslee Fronda. Challenging her is Lisa Ermita of NPC.

Balayan mayoral elections
Party	Candidate	Votes	%
NPC	Lisa Ermita	26,847	50.69
Nacionalista	Leslee Fronda	25,794	48.70
Independent	Pablo Lopez	322	0.61
Total votes		52,963	100.00
NPC gain from Nacionalista			

Incumbent vice mayor Efren Chavez is running for re-election.

Balayan vice mayoral elections
Party	Candidate	Votes	%
Nacionalista	Efren Chavez	26,847	65.13
NPC	Rita Abiad	14,373	34.87
Total votes		52,641	100.00
Nacionalista hold			

==== Calatagan ====
Incumbent Peter Oliver Palacio is term-limited. His son, Pedro Palacio IV is his party's nominee

Calatagan Batangas mayoral election
Party	Candidate	Votes	%
PFP	Rico Puno	16,822	49.13
NPC	Pedro IV Palacio	15,832	46.24
Aksyon	Leni Pantoja	1,588	4.64
Total votes		34,242	100.00
PFP gain from NPC			

Incumbent vice mayor Rogelio Zarraga is running for re-election.

Calatagan Batangas vice mayoral election
Party	Candidate	Votes	%
NPC	Rogelo Zarraga	22,609	69.43
PFP	Ruben Bautista	9,953	30.57
Total votes		32,562	100.00
NPC hold			

Incumbent municipal councilors Bong Ancheta, Danny Pineda and Bay Eleponga are running for re-election.

Calatagan municipal council elections
Party	Candidate	Votes	%
PFP	Rexio Bautista	16,841	7.85
NPC	Bong Ancheta	16,780	7.82
NPC	Noel Delas Alas	15,874	7.40
NPC	Danny Pineda	14,823	6.91
NPC	Bay Eleponga	14,672	6.84
PFP	Jeff Dela Cruz	14,566	6.79
PFP	Harold Anzaldo	13,862	6.46
NPC	Jose Coz Jr	13,298	6.20
PFP	Sheilla Alba-Gonzales	13,053	6.09
NPC	Eric Pelea	11,927	5.56
PFP	Ubong Zapatero	10,770	5.02
NPC	Ernesto Verroya	10,765	5.02
PFP	Mutya Mendoza	10,473	4.88
PFP	Edgar Arellano	10,448	4.87
NPC	Godofredo Sayo	9,255	4.32
PFP	Rodel Mailig	9,034	4.21
Total votes		214,441	100.00
NPC hold			

==== Lemery ====
Incumbent Ian Kenneth Alilio is running for reelection. His opponent is incumbent vice mayor Geraldine Ornales.

Lemery mayoral elections
Candidate	Party	Votes	%
Ian Kenneth Alilio (incumbent)	Nacionalista Party	26,413	50.41
Geraldine Ornales	Nationalist People's Coalition	25,988	49.59
Total		52,401	100.00
Nacionalista Party hold			

Incumbent Geraldine Ornales is running for mayor. Her party nominated incumbent councilor Hannah Beatriz Cabral. Her opponent is fellow councilor Maria Hanalee Bustos

Lemery vice mayoral elections
Candidate	Party	Votes	%
Hannah Beatriz Cabral	Nationalist People's Coalition	26,398	51.53
Maria Hanalee Bustos	Nacionalista Party	24,827	48.47
Total		51,225	100.00
Nationalist People's Coalition gain from Nacionalista Party			

==== Lian ====
Incumbent Joseph Peji is running for reelection.

Lian mayoral elections
Candidate	Party	Votes	%
Joseph Peji (incumbent)	Nacionalista Party	26,003	82.17
Zaldy De Layola	Independent	5,643	17.83
Total		31,646	100.00
Nacionalista Party hold			

Incumbent Ronin Leviste is running for reelection.

Lian vice mayoral elections
Candidate	Party	Votes	%
Iniño Bolompo	Partido Federal ng Pilipinas	16,891	52.09
Ronin Leviste (incumbent)	Nacionalista Party	15,536	47.91
Total		32,427	100.00
Partido Federal ng Pilipinas gain from Nacionalista Party			

==== Nasugbu ====
Incumbent Antonio Jose Barcelon is running for reelection.

Nasugbu mayoral elections
Candidate	Party	Votes	%
Antonio Jose Barcelon (incumbent)	Nationalist People's Coalition	24,319	32.90
Mildred Sanchez	Nacionalista Party	20,081	27.16
Guillerma Limboc	Lakas-CMD	19,554	26.45
Roderick Cabral	Aksyon Demokratiko	9,469	12.81
Melvin Mendoza II	Partido Federal ng Pilipinas	500	0.68
Total		73,923	100.00
Registered voters/turnout			–
Nationalist People's Coalition hold			

Incumbent Mildred Sanchez is running for mayor.

Nasugbu vice mayoral elections
Candidate	Party	Votes	%
Larry Albanio	Nacionalista Party	29,849	42.02
Mildred Sanchez	Nationalist People's Coalition	19,622	27.63
Dennis Apacible	Aksyon Demokratiko	12,831	18.06
Reginald Borge	National Unity Party	8,726	12.29
Total		71,028	100.00
Registered voters/turnout			–
Nacionalista Party hold			

==== Taal ====
Incumbent Fulgencio Mercado is term-limited. Aksyon party nominated his son, Aaron Mercado. Challenging him for the mayoral election are lawyer Atty. Naireeza Grace Bainto of PFP and independent candidate Romeo Baleros.

Taal mayoral election
Party	Candidate	Votes	%
PFP	Naireeza Grace Bainto	23,011	71.31
Independent	Romeo Baleros	7,977	24.72
Aksyon	Aaron Martin Mercado	1,280	3.97
Margin of victory		15,034	46.59
Valid ballots		32,268	79.77
Invalid or blank votes		8,185	20.23
Total votes		40,453	100.00
PFP gain from Independent			

Incumbent vice mayor Michael Rey Vilano is running for reelection.

Taal vice mayoral election
Party	Candidate	Votes	%
NPC	Michael Rey Vilano	23,523	74.55
Independent	Edwin Semaña	8,032	25.45
Margin of victory		15,491	49.09
Valid ballots		31,555	78.00
Invalid or blank votes		8,898	22.00
Total votes		40,453	100.00

==== Tuy ====
Incumbent mayor Jose Jecerell Cerrado is running for reelection. His opponent is former mayor Rowena Raquel Rodriguez.

Results from 2025 mayoral and vice mayoral election of Tuy

Tuy mayoral election
Party	Candidate	Votes	%
NPC	Jose Jecerell Cerrado	18,906	72.03
PFP	Rowena Raquel Rodriguez	7,341	27.97
Valid ballots		25,915	
Total votes		31,097	100.00

Incumbent vice mayor Armando Afable is running for reelection. His opponent is Richman Rodriguez, son of former mayor Rowena Raquel Rodriguez.

Tuy vice mayoral election
Party	Candidate	Votes	%
NPC	Armando Afable	14,086	54.35
PFP	Richman Rodriguez	11,829	45.65
Valid ballots		25,915	
Total votes		31,097	100.00

=== Second district ===
- Municipalities: Bauan, Lobo, Mabini, San Luis, San Pascual, Tingloy

==== Bauan ====
Incumbent Ryanh Dolor declined to run for reelection but instead will run for Vice Governor of Batangas. His wife Wendah Dolor will run for the Mayoralty race. Her opponents are incumbent councilor Patricia Nicole Abrahan and Mario Bejer

Bauan mayoral elections
Party	Candidate	Votes	%
Nacionalista	Wendah Dolor	26,380	51.34
Lakas	Patricia Nicole Abrahan	24,162	47.03
PFP	Mario Bejer	837	1.63
Valid ballots		51,379	84.46
Invalid or blank votes		9,456	15.54
Total votes		60,835	100.00

Incumbent Ronald Cruzat is running for reelection. His opponents are former vice mayor Julian Casapao and former councilor Ren Shuster Maramot

Bauan vice mayoral elections
Party	Candidate	Votes	%
Nacionalista	Ronald Cruzat	19,396	38.46
Lakas	Ren Shuster Maramot	18,915	37.51
Independent	Julian Casapao	12,115	24.03
Valid ballots		50,426	82.89
Invalid or blank votes		10,409	17.11
Total votes		60,835	100.00

Incumbent Leon Ramos Jr is term-limited and will not seek any local positions whereas incumbent Patricia Abrahan will run for mayor.

Bauan municipal council elections
Party	Candidate	Votes	%
Nacionalista	Hero Dolor	29,688	9.75
Nacionalista	Neil Valdez	27,201	8.93
Nacionalista	Guenn Abante	26,465	8.69
Nacionalista	Romel Basilan	25,788	8.47
Nacionalista	Kuya Jem Garcia	22,760	7.28
Nacionalista	Josephine Gemino	22,639	7.44
Nacionalista	Michael Endaya	22,198	7.29
Nacionalista	Marjorie Jelly Adel	22,126	7.27
Independent	William Abrahan	19,309	6.34
Lakas	Diego Renie Magboo	17,930	5.89
PFP	Victor Bejer	17,783	5.84
Independent	Richard "RCC" Cabral	16,160	5.31
PFP	Engr. Rey Lopez	15,216	5.00
Independent	Joey Abrahan	12,439	4.09
Independent	Emil Abrugena	6,773	2.22
Total votes		304,475	100.00
Nacionalista hold			

==== Lobo ====
Incumbent Geronimo Alfiler first assumed as vice mayor upon the death of vice mayor Gaudioso Manalo. Months later, he assumed the mayorship when mayor Lota Manalo was dismissed by the Office of the Ombudsman for violation of the Ease of Doing Business Act. Manalo re-assumed as mayor after the Court of Appeals reversed the decision of the Ombudsman, while Alfiler re-assumed as vice mayor. However, the Office of the Ombudsman suspended Manalo, making Alfiler as the acting mayor.

Lobo mayoral election
Party	Candidate	Votes	%
Lakas	Geronimo Alfiler	12,276	48.13
Nacionalista	Lota Manalo	12,016	47.11
PROMDI	Queenie Manalo	674	2.64
Independent	Michael Cueto	541	2.12
Valid ballots		25,507	
Invalid or blank votes			
Total votes		29,032	100.00

Incumbent Geronimo Alfiler assumed office after the death of vice mayor Gaudioso Manalo. Upon his assumption as mayor, Angelito Abiera who was the first councilor assumed the position of vice mayor. However, upon the re-assumption of Lota Manalo as mayor, Alfiler was re-assumed as vice mayor.

Lobo vice mayoral elections
Party	Candidate	Votes	%
Lakas	Angelito Abiera	11,657	46.30
Nacionalista	Denden Araja	11,189	44.44
Independent	Jason Manalo	2,329	9.25
Valid ballots		25,175	
Invalid or blank votes			
Total votes		29,032	100.00

==== Mabini ====
Incumbent Nilo Villanueva is running for reelection, however he withdrew his candidacy in November 2024. As a result, his opponent, former mayor Noel Luistro is running unopposed

Mabini mayoralty elections
Party	Candidate	Votes	%
PFP	Noel "Bitrics" Luistro	21,422	100.00
Valid ballots		21,422	59.65
Invalid or blank votes		14,491	40.35
Total votes		35,913	100.00
PFP gain from Nacionalista			

Incumbent Leonido Bantugon is running for reelection.

2025 Mabini vice mayoral elections

Mabini vice mayoralty elections
Party	Candidate	Votes	%
PFP	Jose Nelson Hernandez	15,592	53.48
Nacionalista	Leonido Bantugon	13,563	46.52
Valid ballots		29,155	81.07
Invalid or blank votes		6,798	18.93
Total votes		35,913	100.00

==== San Luis ====
Incumbent Oscarlito Hernandez is running for reelection.

San Luis mayoral elections
Party	Candidate	Votes	%
Lakas	Oscarlito Hernandez	14,854	65.05
PFP	Edelino Medina	7,028	30.78
Independent	Felix Diomampo	952	4.17
Valid ballots		22,834	84.91
Invalid or blank votes		4,053	15.19
Total votes		26,877	100.00

Incumbent Ma-an De Gracia is running for reelection.

San Luis vice mayoral elections
Party	Candidate	Votes	%
Lakas	Ma-an De Gracia	7,393	32.32
Nacionalista	Rannie Gatchalian	6,265	27.39
NUP	Benjamin De Castro	5,350	23.29
PFP	Marjorie De Castro	3,863	16.89
Valid ballots		22,871	85.06
Invalid or blank votes		4,016	14.94
Total votes		26,887	100.00

==== San Pascual ====
Although eligible for reelection, incumbent Antonio Dimayuga is no longer seeking reelection. Running for the position is incumbent Vice Mayor Angelina Castillo and former mayor Rosario Anna Victoria Conti. The Commission on Elections cancelled the candidacy of incumbent board member Arlina Magboo due to false material representation.

San Pascual mayoral elections
Party	Candidate	Votes	%
Independent	Rosario Anna Victoria Conti	19,809	54.19
Lakas	Angelina Castillo	16,743	45.81
Valid ballots		36,552	
Invalid or blank votes			
Total votes		44,264	100.00

Incumbent Angelina Castillo is running for mayor. Lakas-CMD nominated former councilor and lawyer Reyshanne Joy Marquez. Her opponent is incumbent councilor Romuel Aguila of Nacionalista.

San Pascual vice mayoral elections
Party	Candidate	Votes	%
Nacionalista	Romuel Aguila	19,245	53.08
Lakas	Reyshanne Joy Marquez	17,009	46.92
Valid ballots		36,254	
Invalid or blank votes			
Total votes		44,264	100.00

San Pascual municipal council elections
Party	Candidate	Votes	%
Nacionalista	Graziella Medrano	17,036	7.72
Lakas	Atty. Jaime Collantes	13,372	6.06
Lakas	Hazzel Bulanhagui	13,236	6.00
Lakas	Cedrick Pujante	12,248	5.55
Lakas	Engr. Dennis Cullado	11,141	5.05
Nacionalista	Rowena Manalo	10,692	4.84
Lakas	Weng Cantos	10,413	4.72
Lakas	Jessi Jusi	10,033	4.55
Nacionalista	Earell Recipeda	9,332	4.23
Lakas	Boy Tamayo	9,188	4.16
Nacionalista	Kap Orly Panopio	8,946	4.05
Nacionalista	Dave Dimatatac	8,851	4.01
Nacionalista	Kap Lando Maranan	8,673	3.93
Lakas	Parnel Conti	8,509	3.86
Nacionalista	Engr. Norman Dimatatac	8,203	3.72
Nacionalista	Atty. Baro Barola	7,881	3.57
Aksyon	Jay Fider	6,969	3.16
Independent	Auring Mendoza	5,735	2.60
Independent	Angelyn Comia	5,674	2.57
Independent	Moises Chavez	5,643	2.56
Independent	Rodney Cantos	5,245	2.38
Independent	Claro Conti	4,845	2.20
Independent	Tony Mauhay	4,740	2.15
Independent	Randy Bacong	4,195	1.90
Independent	Nhep Caraan	4,025	1.82
Independent	Francisco Manalo	3,660	1.66
Independent	JV Conti	3,015	1.37
Independent	Emmanuel Lualhati Jr	2,093	0.95
Independent	Ruben Guia	2,087	0.94
Independent	Ramel Fernandez	837	0.38
Total votes		220,796	100.00

Team MaGuilas			Team LynnKod Castillo		
Position	Name	Party	Position	Name	Party
Mayor	Doc Arlene Magboo	Aksyon	Mayor	Angelina "Lynn" Castillo	Lakas-CMD
Vice Mayor	Roumel Aguila	Nacionalista	Vice Mayor	Atty. Reyshanne Marquez	Lakas-CMD
Congressman (2nd District)	Raneo Abu	Nacionalista	Congressman (2nd District)	Atty. Gerville "Jinky-Bitrics" Luistro	Lakas-CMD
Board Member (2nd District)	Dra Reina Abu-Reyes	Nacionalista	Board Member (2nd District)	Amy Alvarez	Lakas-CMD
Board Member (2nd District)	Jently Ona Rivera	Nacionalista	Board Member (2nd District)	Richard Dieza	Lakas-CMD
Municipal Councilor	Graziella Medrano	Nacionalista	Municipal Councilor	Atty. Jamie Collantes	Lakas-CMD
Municipal Councilor	Rowena Manalo	Nacionalista	Municipal Councilor	Hazzel Bulanhagui	Lakas-CMD
Municipal Councilor	Earell Recipeda	Nacionalista	Municipal Councilor	Cedrick Pujante	Lakas-CMD
Municipal Councilor	Kap Orly Panopio	Nacionalista	Municipal Councilor	Engr. Dennis Cullado	Lakas-CMD
Municipal Councilor	Dave Dimatatac	Nacionalista	Municipal Councilor	Weng Cantos	Lakas-CMD
Municipal Councilor	Kap Lando Maranan	Nacionalista	Municipal Councilor	Jessie Jusi	Lakas-CMD
Municipal Councilor	Engr. Norman Dimatatac	Nacionalista	Municipal Councilor	Boy Tamayo	Lakas-CMD
Municipal Councilor	Atty. Baro Barola	Nacionalista	Municipal Councilor	Parnel Conti	Lakas-CMD

Team Conti-backed Alliance
Position	Name	Party
Mayor	Roanna Conti	Independent
Municipal Councilor	Angelyn Comia	Independent
Municipal Councilor	Auring Mendoza	Independent
Municipal Councilor	Claro Conti	Independent
Municipal Councilor	Emmanuel Lualhati Jr	Independent
Municipal Councilor	Francisco Manalo	Independent
Municipal Councilor	JV Conti	Independent
Municipal Councilor	Moises Chavez	Independent
Municipal Councilor	Nhep Caraan	Independent
Municipal Councilor	Ramel Fernandez	Independent
Municipal Councilor	Randy Bacong	Independent
Municipal Councilor	Rodney Cantos	Independent
Municipal Councilor	Ruben Guia	Independent
Municipal Councilor	Tony Mauhay	Independent

==== Tingloy ====
Incumbent mayor Lauro Alvarez and vice mayor Dawn Erika Alvarez will stand unopposed for reelection.

Tingloy mayoral elections
Party	Candidate	Votes	%
Independent	Lauro Alvarez	7,173	100.00
Valid ballots		7,173	
Invalid or blank votes			
Total votes		11,385	
Independent hold			

Tingloy vice mayoral elections
Party	Candidate	Votes	%
Independent	Dawn Erika Alvarez	7,240	100.00
Valid ballots		7,240	
Invalid or blank votes			
Total votes		11,385	
Independent hold			

=== Third district ===
- Cities: Santo Tomas, Tanauan
- Municipalities: Agoncillo, Alitagtag, Balete, Cuenca, Laurel, Malvar, Mataasnakahoy, San Nicolas, Santa Teresita, Talisay

==== Santo Tomas ====
Incumbent Arth Jhun Marasigan is running for reelection. His opponents are Raymond Theodore Almeda, Dennis Sanchez and former municipal engineer Nolie Sanchez.

Santo Tomas mayoral elections
Party	Candidate	Votes	%
Nacionalista	Arth Jhun Marasigan	68,583	67.32
Lakas	Nolando Sanchez	29,251	28.71
NPC	Dennis Sanchez	3,434	3.37
Independent	Raymond Theodore Almeda	608	0.6
Valid ballots		101,876	
Invalid or blank votes			
Total votes		124,836	
Nacionalista hold			

Incumbent Cathy Jaurige-Perez is running for reelection. Her opponent is former vice mayor Armenius Silva.

Santo Tomas vice mayoral election
Party	Candidate	Votes	%
Nacionalista	Cathy Jaurige-Perez	69,038	70.46
Lakas	Armenius Silva	28,950	29.54
Valid ballots		97,988	
Invalid or blank votes			
Total votes		124,836	100.00
Nacionalista hold			

2025 Santo Tomas City Council elections
Party	Candidate	Votes	%
NPC	Ross Allan Maligaya	59,287	7.78
NPC	Victor Bathan	53,375	7.00
NPC	Leovino Villegas	50.798	6.66
NPC	Adrian Carpio	52,862	6.93
NPC	Arturo Pecaña	51,849	6.80
NPC	Helengrace Navarro	50,578	6.63
NPC	Danilo Mabilangan	50,061	6.57
NPC	Wilfredo Maliksi	48,772	6.40
Nacionalista	Raquel Maloles-Salazar	46,505	6.10
NPC	Proceso Mendoza	38,098	5.00
Lakas	Renante Arcillas	35,922	4.71
Lakas	Boy Christopher Ramos	27,613	3.62
Lakas	Jay Oloc-oloc	25,718	3.37
Lakas	Kim Ryan Balitaan	25,511	3.35
Lakas	Eric Gonzales	22,841	3.00
Lakas	Ma. Filipina Garcia	20,558	2.70
Lakas	Bobbit Guevarra	19,636	2.58
Lakas	Bernardo Sarmiento	18,505	2.43
Lakas	Filomeno Miel Nora	18,179	2.38
Lakas	Elenita Allanigue	16,975	2.23
Independent	Sonny Carpio	12,204	1.60
Independent	Al Sanchez	8,173	1.07
Independent	Homer Salvador	5,177	0.68
Independent	Choiy Sy	3,327	0.44
Total votes		762,519	100.00

==== Tanauan ====
Incumbent Nelson Perez Collantes is running for reelection. His opponents are his 2022 primary opponent Mark Anthony Halili and incumbent vice-mayor Herminigildo Trinidad Jr.

Tanauan mayoral election
Party	Candidate	Votes	%
NPC	Sonny Collantes	64,266	49.97
PFP	Mark Anthony Halili	34,019	26.45
PDP–Laban	Herminigildo Trinidad, Jr.	29,684	23.08
Independent	Jesusa Garcia	524	0.41
Independent	Alberto Javier	120	0.09
Valid ballots		128,613	84.95
Invalid or blank votes		22,787	15.05
Total votes		151,400	100.00
NPC hold			

Incumbent Herminigildo Trinidad, Jr. is not seeking reelection and will instead run for mayor. NPC nominated Wilfredo Ablao and challenging him is PFP vice mayoral nominee Sam Bengzon.

Tanauan vice mayoral election
Party	Candidate	Votes	%
NPC	Wilfredo Ablao	63,811	51.91
PFP	Sam Bengzon	59,109	48.09
Valid ballots		122,920	81.89
Invalid or blank votes		28,480	19.11
Total votes		151,400	100.00
NPC gain from PDP–Laban			

2025 Tanauan City Council Elections
Party	Candidate	Votes	%
NPC	Tirso Oruga	63,522	41.96
NPC	Clarence Micosa	59,964	39.61
NPC	Sonny Natanauan	56,227	37.14
NPC	Czylene Marqueses	47,962	31.68
PFP	Kristel Guelos	46,372	30.63
NPC	Rene Alcantara	45,331	29.94
PFP	Marissa Tabing	44,990	29.72
NPC	Mario Leus Gonzales	43,531	28.75
NPC	Lilibeth Arcega	42,675	28.19
PFP	Marcelo Eric Manglo	40,116	26.50
PFP	Herman De Sagun	39,818	26.30
NPC	Chevy Blessing Menguito	38,781	25.61
PFP	Eugene Yson	38,763	25.60
PDP	Angel Burgos	35,735	23.60
PFP	Joseph Castillo	35,602	23.52
PFP	Shirley Platon	35,316	23.33
PDP	Glen Win Gonzales	34,316	22.67
PFP	Carlos Laurel	34,156	22.56
PFP	Benedicto Corona	33,499	22.13
NPC	Marco Amurao	33,236	21.95
NPC	Rebecca Javier	30,695	20.27
PDP	Kennedy Macalindong	24,277	16.04
PFP	Bobby Ofrin	20,251	13.38
Independent	Marie Ramilo	8,686	5.74
Independent	Leo Hernandez	7,617	5.04
Independent	Cipriano Rile	6,431	4.25
Independent	Marcos Valdez	6,408	4.23
Independent	Edwin Magsino	6,073	4.01
Independent	Jofet Villaflor	3,084	2.04
Independent	Mark Rodelas	2,931	1.94
Independent	Glandina Luna	2,708	1.79
Total votes			

==== Agoncillo ====
Incumbent Cinderella Reyes is running for reelection. Her opponent is former vice mayor Danilo Amuran

Agoncillo mayoral elections
Party	Candidate	Votes	%
NPC	Cinderella Reyes	13,710	56.87
Lakas	Danilo Anuran	10,398	43.13
Valid ballots		24,108	88.04
Invalid or blank votes		3,275	11.96
Total votes		27,383	100.00
NPC hold			

Incumbent Daniel Reyes is not seeking reelection.

Agoncillo vice mayoral elections
Party	Candidate	Votes	%
NPC	Remjelljan Humarang	12,396	52.14
Lakas	Anna Kristina De Leon	11,382	47.86
Valid ballots		23,778	86.83
Invalid or blank votes		3,605	13.17
Total votes		27,383	100.00
NPC hold			

==== Alitagtag ====
Incumbent Edilberto Ponggos is not seeking reelection. His wife Jo-ann Ponggos is his party's nominee. She and incumbent vice mayor Manuel Abrigo are running unopposed.

Alitagtag mayoral elections
Party	Candidate	Votes	%
NPC	Jo-Ann Ponggos	12,283	100.00
Valid ballots		12,283	63.81
Invalid or blank votes		6,966	36.19
Total votes		19,249	100.00
NPC hold			

Alitagtag vice mayoral elections
Party	Candidate	Votes	%
NPC	Manuel Abrigo	13,177	100.00
Valid ballots		13,177	68.46
Invalid or blank votes		6,072	31.54
Total votes		19,249	100.00
NPC hold			

==== Balete ====
Incumbent Wilson Maralit is running for reelection.

Balete mayoralty elections
Party	Candidate	Votes	%
Nacionalista	Wilson Maralit	9,418	73.21
Independent	Armando Maralit	3,108	24.16
Independent	Dojie Ocampo	339	2.63
Valid ballots		12,865	
Invalid or blank votes			
Total votes		15,206	
Nacionalista hold			

Incumbent Alvin Payo is running for reelection.

Balete vice mayoral election
Party	Candidate	Votes	%
Nacionalista	Alvin Payo	6,898	55.78
Independent	Erwin Ocampo	5,469	44.22
Valid ballots		12,368	
Invalid or blank votes			
Total votes		15,206	
Nacionalista hold			

==== Cuenca ====
Incumbent Alexander Magpantay is running for reelection. His opponents are former mayor Faye Endaya-Baretto and incumbent Councilor Ervin Remo.

Cuenca mayoralty elections
Party	Candidate	Votes	%
NPC	Alexander Magpantay	11,938	53.34
Lakas	Ervin Raymund Remo	6,330	28.28
Liberal	Faye Endaya=Baretto	4,113	18.38
Valid ballots		22,318	
Invalid or blank votes			
Total votes		25,742	

Incumbent Aurea Pantas is running for re-election. Her opponents are Melvin Cuevas and councilor Niña Verdan.

Cuenca vice mayoralty elections
Party	Candidate	Votes	%
NPC	Aurea Pantas	9,337	42.41
Lakas	Niña Nelia Verdan	6,432	29.22
Liberal	Melvin Cuevas	6,245	28.37
Valid ballots		22,014	
Invalid or blank votes			
Total votes		25,742	

==== Laurel ====
Incumbent Lyndon Bruce is running for reelection. His opponent is former mayor Randy James Amo.

Laurel mayoralty elections
Party	Candidate	Votes	%
NPC	Lyndon Bruce	17,891	69.07
Liberal	Randy James Amo	8,011	30.93
Valid ballots		25,902	
Invalid or blank votes			
Total votes		28,925	

Incumbent Aries Parrilla initially filed for reelection but later withdrew to give way to the candidacy of Brandon Bruce, incumbent ABC president and brother of incumbent mayor Lyndon Bruce. His opponents Gerardo Mendoza, former vice mayor Rachelle Ogalinola, and John-John Rodriguez.

Laurel vice mayoralty elections
Party	Candidate	Votes	%
Independent	Brandon Bruce	16,365	64.58
PFP	Gerardo Mendoza	4,675	18.45
Independent	John-John Rodriguez	3,761	14.84
Liberal	Rachelle Ogalinola	518	2.12
Valid ballots		25,902	
Invalid or blank votes			
Total votes		28,925	

==== Malvar ====
Incumbent Cristeta Reyes is running for reelection. Her opponent is former Philippine Coast Guard commandant Artemio Abu.

Malvar mayoralty election
Party	Candidate	Votes	%
PFP	Artemio Abu	16,686	51.05
Nacionalista	Critsteta Reyes	15,997	48.95
Valid ballots		32,683	
Invalid or blank votes			
Total votes		39,256	

Incumbent Alberto Lat is running for councilor. His brother, incumbent councilor Emiliano Lat is his party's nominee. His opponent is Fe Magpantay, sister of former vice mayor Simeon Magpantay.

Malvar vice mayoralty election
Party	Candidate	Votes	%
PFP	Emiliano Lat	22,486	69.67
Nacionalista	Fe Magpantay	9,790	30.33
Valid ballots		32,276	
Invalid or blank votes			
Total votes		39,256	

==== Mataasnakahoy ====
Incumbent Janet Ilagan is running for reelection. Her opponent is Lucia Ellery Gardiola-Silva, sister of incumbent CWS Partylist Representative Edwin Gardiola and wife of former mayor Gualberto Silva.

Mataasnakahoy mayoralty elections
Party	Candidate	Votes	%
Nacionalista	Lucia Ellery Gardiola-Silva	12,376	62.66
PROMDI	Janet Ilagan	7,346	37.34
Total votes		22,311	

Incumbent Jay Ilagan is running for Governor of Batangas.

Mataasnakahoy vice mayoralty elections
Party	Candidate	Votes	%
Nacionalista	Engr. Earel Benedicto Gardiola	12,852	66.40
PROMDI	Mark Villalobos	5,527	28.56
Independent	Glenn Dimaano	975	504
Total votes		19,354	

==== San Nicolas ====
Incumbent Lester De Sagun is running for reelection.

San Nicolas mayoral elections
Party	Candidate	Votes	%
NPC	Lester De Sagun	8,562	62.05
PFP	Aquilino Harvey Gahol	5,236	37.95
Valid ballots		13,798	
Invalid or blank votes			
Total votes		16,051	100.00

Incumbent Napoleon Arceo is running for reelection.

San Nicolas vice mayoralty elections
Party	Candidate	Votes	%
Lakas	Mark Jason De Sagun	6,955	51.00
NPC	Napoleon Arceo	5,765	42.27
PFP	Ireneo Hernandez	917	6.72
Valid ballots		13,637	
Invalid or blank votes			
Total votes		16,051	100.00

==== Santa Teresita ====
Incumbent Norberto Segunial Jr. is running for reelection.

Santa Teresita mayoralty elections
Party	Candidate	Votes	%
Nacionalista	Norberto Segunial Jr.	8,998	76.46
PROMDI	Francia Dagook	2,771	23.54
Valid ballots		11,796	
Invalid or blank votes			
Total votes		14,295	

Incumbent Ma. Aurea Segunial is running for reelection.

Santa Teresita vice mayoralty elections
Party	Candidate	Votes	%
Nacionalista	Ma. Aurea Segunial	9,399	82.65
PROMDI	Reginaldo Marquinez	1,973	17.35
Valid ballots		11,372	
Invalid or blank votes			
Total votes		14,295	

==== Talisay ====
Incumbent Nestor Natanauan is running for reelection.

Talisay mayoralty elections
Party	Candidate	Votes	%
NPC	Nestor Natanauan	16,901	64.66
PFP	Gerry Natanauan	9,239	35.34
Valid ballots		26,140	
Invalid or blank votes			
Total votes		30,724	

Incumbent Francis Magsino is running for reelection

Talisay vice mayoralty elections
Party	Candidate	Votes	%
NPC	Francis Magsino	15,978	62.96
PFP	Jerome Natanauan	9,400	37.04
Valid ballots		25,378	
Invalid or blank votes			
Total votes		30,724	

=== Fourth district ===
- Municipalities: Ibaan, Padre Garcia, Rosario, San Jose, San Juan, Taysan

==== Ibaan ====
2025 Ibaan Batangas Mayoral and Vice Mayoral election results per barangay

Incumbent Edralyn Joy Salvame is running for vice mayor. She endorsed businesswoman Jane Casas for the position. Her opponent is former mayor Artemio Chua. Henry Perez was declared a nuisance candidate by the Commission on Elections.

Ibaan mayoral election
Party	Candidate	Votes	%
PRP	Jane Casas	20,880	57.00
Independent	Artemio Chua	15,757	43.00
Valid ballots		36,637	88.71
Invalid or blank votes		4,664	11.29
Total votes		41,301	100.00

Incumbent Juvy Mendoza is running for councilor. Her party nominated incumbent mayor Edralyn Joy Salvame. Her opponent is Marlon De Torres.

Ibaan vice mayoral election
Party	Candidate	Votes	%
PRP	Edralyn Joy Salvame	24,656	67.51
Independent	Marlon De Torres	11,731	32.49
Valid ballots		36,387	88.10
Invalid or blank votes		4,914	11.90
Total votes		41,301	100.00

Ibaan municipal council election
Party	Candidate	Votes	%
Independent	Juvy Mendoza		
Independent	John Henry Cabatay		
Independent	Erwin Andal		
Independent	Eloise Jan Tejada		
Independent	Sixto Yabyabin		
Independent	Arsenio Ricero		
PRP	Eddie Pasia		
Independent	Phill Joshua Caringal		
Independent	Paquito Barte		
Independent	Jullius Panaligan		
Independent	Cesar Marasigan		
Independent	Almario Hernandez		
Independent	Guardiano "Dondon" Ron Jr.		
Independent	Mynard Mendoza		
Independent	Lhoulou "Lulu" Andal		
Total votes			

==== Padre Garcia ====
Both mayor Celsa Rivera and vice mayor Micko Angelo Rivera will stand unopposed for reelection.

Padre Garcia mayoral election
Party	Candidate	Votes	%
Liberal	Celsa Rivera	26,800	100.00
Valid ballots		26,800	100.00
Invalid or blank votes			
Total votes		34,545	
Liberal hold			

Padre Garcia Vice mayoral election
Party	Candidate	Votes	%
Liberal	Micko Angelo Rivera	26,405	100.00
Valid ballots		26,405	
Invalid or blank votes			
Total votes		34,545	100.00
Liberal hold			

==== Rosario ====
Incumbent Leovigildo Morpe is running for reelection. His opponent is Joel Alvarez, who was his opponent in 2022.

Rosario mayoral election
Party	Candidate	Votes	%
Nacionalista	Leovigildo Morpe	48,249	65.85
Aksyon	Joel Alvarez	24,760	33.79
Independent	Nestor Ilagan	258	0.39
Margin of victory		23,489	32.06
Valid ballots		73,267	86.15
Invalid or blank votes		11,778	13.85
Total votes		85,045	100.00
Nacionalista hold			

Incumbent Atanacio Zara is running for reelection. His opponent is former mayor Manuel Alvarez.

Rosario vice mayoral election
Party	Candidate	Votes	%
Nacionalista	Atanacio Zara	51,274	72.02
Aksyon	Manuel Alvarez	19,920	27.98
Margin of victory		31,354	44.04
Valid ballots		71,194	83.71
Invalid or blank votes		13,851	16.29
Total votes		85,045	100.00
Nacionalista hold			

2025 Rosario Municipal Council Elections
Party	Candidate	Votes	%
Nacionalista	Jose Galicha		
Nacionalista	Edward Aguilar		
Nacionalista	Darius Aguado		
Nacionalista	Marciano Aquino		
Nacionalista	Joaz De Veyra		
Nacionalista	Dennis Hernandez		
Nacionalista	Teodoro Karr Luansing		
Nacionalista	Albino Altura		
Aksyon	Arnold Austria		
Aksyon	Victor Delen		
Aksyon	Christopher Conti		
Aksyon	Marilou Villapando		
Aksyon	Louie Montalbo		
Aksyon	Apolonia Ilagan		
Aksyon	Nelson Dagli		
Aksyon	Lolly Barcelos		
PFP	Marawi Omandam		
Total votes			

==== San Jose ====
Incumbent Mayor Valentino Patron is term-limited and is running for Vice Mayor. His daughter, incumbent councilor Vanessa Patron is his party's nominee. Her opponents are former mayor Entiquio Briones, Genaro Masilungan Jr. and incumbent ABC president Reggie Virtucio, widow of former Vice Mayor Noel Virtucio.

San Jose mayoral election
Party	Candidate	Votes	%
Nacionalista	Kap Reggie Virtucio	20,413	37.14
PFP	Entiquio "Tikyo" Briones	17,986	32.73
Aksyon	Vanessa Patron	16,454	29.94
Independent	Genaro Masilungan Jr.	105	0.19
Valid ballots		54,958	88.31
Invalid or blank votes		7,728	11.69
Total votes		62,236	100.00
Nacionalista gained from Aksyon			

Incumbent Vice Mayor Renji Arcilla who assumed office after the death of Vice Mayor Noel Virtucio is not seeking a three-year term and will run for reelection as municipal councilor. His party nominated incumbent mayor Valentino Patron, who also previously served as vice mayor for one term (2013-2016).

San Jose vice mayoral election
Party	Candidate	Votes	%
Aksyon	Valentino Patron	23,428	43.65
PFP	Oscar Mendoza	20,686	38.54
Nacionalista	Alex Mendoza	9,323	17.37
Independent	Ronald Macaraig	233	0.43
Valid ballots		53,670	86.24
Invalid or blank votes		8,566	13.76
Total votes		62,236	100.00
Aksyon gained from Nacionalista			

Eight councilors will be elected using plurality block voting. The winning seats were split between the PFP and Aksyon slates, resulting the councilors composition to have different political views. PFP dominates the majority whereas the Aksyon has the minority.

San Jose Sangguniang Bayan election
Party	Candidate	Votes	%
PFP	Comia, Arnold	29,523	47.44
PFP	Briones, Kaye	23,432	37.65
PFP	Agbing, Joner	20,944	33.65
PFP	Atienza, Doc Benny	20,277	32.58
PFP	Makalintal, Tonton	19,005	30.54
PFP	Mendoza, Joey	18,778	30.17
Aksyon	Zara, Japoy Guce	17,794	28.59
Aksyon	Arcilla, Tesdaman	16,927	27.20
PFP	Ilao, Ruel	16,312	26.21
Nacionalista	Hernandez, Zandra Bianca	15,333	24.64
Aksyon	Aguila, Arnold	15,119	24.29
Nacionalista	Carandang, Rudy	14,238	22.88
NPC	Aguila, Ana Puti	13,498	21.69
Aksyon	Flores, Carmi	13,189	21.19
Aksyon	Rodriguez, Jojo	11,826	19.00
Aksyon	Ona, Biboy_Alday	11,435	18.37
Nacionalista	Mendoza, Sir Raven	9,939	15.97
Nacionalista	Ona, Arkitek Julius	8,393	13.49
Independent	Umali, Odie	7,497	12.05
Independent	Rodriguez, Joe	6,559	10.54
Independent	Aguila, Aquilino	6,059	9.74
PFP	Morfi, Allan	5,875	9.44
Aksyon	Luna, Marchal Tito	5,413	8.70
Nacionalista	Morfe, Hener	4,847	7.79
Nacionalista	Cruz, Inah	3,457	5.55
Total Votes Cast / Turnout		62,236	100.00
PFP gained from NP and Aksyon hold			

==== San Juan ====
Both mayor Ildebrando Salud and vice mayor Octavio Antonio Marasigan will stand unopposed for reelection.

San Juan mayoral election
Party	Candidate	Votes	%
Nacionalista	Ildebrando Salud	51,772	100.00
Valid ballots		51,772	
Invalid or blank votes			
Total votes		76,584	
Nacionalista hold			

San Juan Vice mayoral election
Party	Candidate	Votes	%
Nacionalista	Octavio Antonio Marasigan	51,725	100.00
Valid ballots		51,725	
Invalid or blank votes			
Total votes		76,584	
Nacionalista hold			

2025 San Juan Municipal Council Elections
Party	Candidate	Votes	%
Nacionalista	Wenilo Ada	38,423	11.35
Nacionalista	Angelo Luis Marasigan	37,859	11.118
Nacionalista	Florencio "Poling" De Chavez	36,375	10.74
Independent	Shalimar Salud	31,391	9.27
Nacionalista	Miljun Magadia	29,551	8.73
Nacionalista	Gerardo Tantay, Jr.	26,410	7.80
Nacionalista	Grenalyn "Ineng" Virtusio	26,089	7.71
Independent	Owen Manimtim	25,864	7.64
Nacionalista	Meynardo Robles	24,102	7.12
Nacionalista	Erniño "Kid" Llana	23,756	7.02
Independent	Allan Malabanan	18,080	5.34
Independent	Alexander Mercado	15,559	4.60
Independent	Pelita Zaraspe	5,126	1.51
Total votes		338,585	100.00

==== Taysan ====
Incumbent Edilberto Abaday who assumed office after the Office of the Ombudsman dismissed former mayor Grande Gutierrez is running for his first full three-year term. His opponents are Elizabeth Gutierrez, wife of former mayor Grande Gutierrez, former mayor Victor Portugal Jr. and 2022 mayoral candidate Brigido Villena.

Taysan mayoral election
Party	Candidate	Votes	%
PROMDI	Brigido Villena	7,864	30.14
NPC	Victor Portugal Jr.	7,569	29.01
Nacionalista	Edilberto Abaday	5,357	20.53
Independent	Elizabeth Gutierrez	5,300	20.31
Margin of victory		295	1.13
Valid ballots		26,090	86.97
Invalid or blank votes		3,910	13.03
Total votes		30,000	100.00
PROMDI gained from Nacionalista			

Incumbent Luis Favorito who assumed office after the assumption of Edilberto Abaday as mayor following the dismissal of mayor Grande Gutierrez is no longer seeking a three-year term. His party nominated Bongbong Comia. His opponents are incumbent councilor Francisco Dio, former Vice Mayor Marianito Perez, and former Batangas City councilor Eloisa Portugal.

Taysan vice mayoral election
Party	Candidate	Votes	%
NPC	Eloisa Portugal	7,907	30.93
Nacionalista	Bongbong Comia	6,475	25.32
PROMDI	Marianito Perez	5,411	21.16
Independent	Francisco Dio	3,944	15.43
Independent	Ronald Ancheta	1,831	7.16
Margin of victory		1,432	5.61
Valid ballots		25,568	85.23
Invalid or blank votes		4,432	14.77
Total votes		30,000	100.00
NPC gained from Nacionalista			

=== Fifth district ===
- City: Batangas City

==== Batangas City ====
Incumbent Beverley Rose Dimacuha is term-limited and is running for Congress, switching places with her husband, incumbent representative Marvey Mariño.

Batangas City mayoral election
Party	Candidate	Votes	%
Nacionalista	Marvey Mariño	116,487	62.85
PFP	Clemente Berberabe	68,857	37.15
Margin of victory		47,630	25.70
Valid ballots		185,344	81.20
Invalid or blank votes		42,919	18.80
Total votes		228,263	100.00
Nacionalista hold			

Incumbent Alyssa Renee Cruz is running for reelection.

Batangas City vice mayoral election
Party	Candidate	Votes	%
Nacionalista	Alyssa Cruz	147,955	84.48
PFP	Carlo Mercado	27,183	15.52
Margin of victory		120,772	68.96
Valid ballots		175,138	76.73
Invalid or blank votes		53,125	23.27
Total votes		228,263	100.00
Nacionalista hold			

2025 Batangas City Council Elections
Party	Candidate	Votes	%
Nacionalista	Ma. Claudette Ambida	148,368	10.69
Nacionalista	Aileen Montalbo	129,116	9.30
Nacionalista	Arthur Blanco	127,991	9.22
Nacionalista	Andrea Faytaren Macaraig	115,831	8.34
Nacionalista	Gerry Dela Roca	101,539	7.31
Nacionalista	Armando Lazarte	98,027	7.06
Nacionalista	Lorenzo Gamboa Jr.	92,792	6.68
Nacionalista	Ailin Grace Dimacuha	90,914	6.55
Nacionalista	Zester Carlo Hernandez	90,244	6.50
Nacionalista	Jonash Tolentino	89,860	6.47
Nacionalista	Isidra "Ched" Atienza	87,872	6.33
Nacionalista	Michael Villena	85,495	6.16
PFP	Ruben Maderazo	29,468	2.12
PFP	Francisco Tegon	28,281	2.03
Independent	Julian Mendoza	26,230	1.89
PFP	Archie Tumambing	25,614	1.84
PFP	Dan-Rey Reyes	20,828	1.50
Total votes		1,387,171	100.00
Nacionalista hold			

=== Sixth district ===
- City: Lipa

Incumbent Eric Africa is running for reelection unopposed.

Lipa City mayoral election
Party	Candidate	Votes	%
Nacionalista	Eric Africa	194,319	100.00
Valid ballots		194,319	75.49
Invalid or blank votes		63,082	24.51
Total votes		257,401	100.00
Nacionalista hold			

Incumbent Camille Angeline Lopez is running for reelection. Her opponent is incumbent councilor Mikee Morada.

Lipa City vice mayoral election
Party	Candidate	Votes	%
Nacionalista	Mikee Morada	140,205	66.01
Independent	Camille Angeline Lopez	72,194	33.99
Margin of victory		68,011	32.02
Valid ballots		212,399	82.52
Invalid or blank votes		45,002	17.48
Total votes		257,401	100.00
Nacionalista gained from Independent			

2025 Lipa City Council Elections
Party	Candidate	Votes	%
Nacionalista	Lydio Lopez Jr.	147,107	8.63
Nacionalista	Jennifer Spye Toledo	141,143	8.28
Nacionalista	Gally Angeles	140,716	8.25
Nacionalista	Venice Manalo	131,604	7.72
Nacionalista	Nicole Ronquillo	128,378	7.53
Nacionalista	Mike Lina	122,425	7.18
Nacionalista	Mark Aries Luancing	121,026	7.10
Nacionalista	Joel Pua	119,239	6.99
Nacionalista	Merlo Silva	118,923	6.97
Nacionalista	Mikee Umali	113,093	6.63
Nacionalista	Leonilo Catipon	112,777	6.61
Nacionalista	Aries Macala	108,446	6.36
Independent	Beverly Luancing-Luna	95,728	5.61
Independent	Earl Maranan	31,773	1.85
Independent	Ed Villanueva	31,227	1.83
Independent	Roy Sanggalang	25,565	1.50
Independent	Leo Ona	16,409	0.96
Total votes		1,805,579	100.00
Nacionalista hold			
