= 2016 Batangas City local elections =

Local election in Batangas City in 2016

2016 Batangas mayoral election
- May 9, 2016
Nominee	Beverley Dimacuha	Kristine Balmes
Party	Liberal	PDP–Laban
Running mate	N/A	Emilio Francisco Berberabe, Jr.
Popular vote	85,963	55,866
Percentage	56.74	36.87
Mayor before election
Eduardo Dimacuha
Liberal
Elected mayor
Beverley Dimacuha
Liberal

Local elections were held in Batangas City on May 9, 2016 within the Philippine general election. The voters will elect candidates for the elective local posts in the city: the mayor, vice mayor, the congressman (which will represent Batangas' fifth district which is composed of just the city), two provincial board members, and the 12 members of its city council.

Unlike in the 2013 elections, voters of the city will be electing its first member in the House of Representatives, two representatives to the Batangas provincial board, and two more councilors thus bringing the councilors' total to 12 as opposed to the previous 10.

== Background ==
=== Mayoral and Vice Mayoral elections ===
Incumbent Mayor Eduardo Dimacuha is running for his eighth nonconsecutive term as Mayor of Batangas. He assumed the mayorship in 1988 and until 1998. He again ran for Mayor in 2001 and was elected in 2004 and 2007. He then elected again in 2013. He will run for his tenth nonconsecutive term as Mayor without a vice mayoral candidate under the Liberal Party.

His opponent is councilor Kristine Balmes, incidentally his former daughter-in-law under the PDP–Laban.

On December 9, 2015, Dimacuha withdrew his candidacy for Mayor. Substituting him is his youngest and only daughter, Beverley Dimacuha, also wife of incumbent Board Member Marvey Mariño. This will be the first time, that women will be battling the mayoralty post. Whoever wins will be the second female mayor next to former Mayor Vilma Dimacuha who was elected in 2010.

== Results ==
=== District Representative ===
Incumbent Board Member Marvey Mariño will run for the newly created 5th District against Danilo Berberabe.

2016 Philippine House of Representatives election in Batangas's 5th District (Lone District of Batangas City)
Party	Candidate	Votes	%
Liberal	Marvey Mariño	69,577	45.92%
UNA	Danilo Berberabe	46,967	31.00%
Independent	Hernando Perez	15,951	10.53%
PGP	Felipe Baroja	5,587	3.69%
PDP–Laban	Carlito Bisa	4,145	2.74%
Invalid or blank votes		9,284	6.13%
Total votes		151,511	100%

=== Provincial Board Members ===
Batangas 5th District Sangguniang Panlalawigan election
Party	Candidate	Votes	%
Liberal	Claudette Ambida	74,221	33.42
Liberal	Arthur Blanco	73,186	32.96
PDP–Laban	Jose Virgilio Tolentino	47,262	21.28
Independent	Angelito Bagui	27,395	12.34
Total votes		222,064	100.00

=== Mayor ===
Incumbent Mayor Eduardo Dimacuha is running for reelection. Running without his vice mayoralty partner, his opponent is incumbent councilor Kristine Balmes, incidentally his former daughter-in-law. On December 10, Mayor Dimachua withdrew his bid for reelection bid to give way to his daughter Beverley Rose Dimacuha-Mariño, wife of congressional candidate and incumbent board member Marvey Mariño.

Batangas City mayoralty elections
Party	Candidate	Votes	%
Liberal	Beverley Rose Dimacuha-Mariño	85,963	56.74%
PDP–Laban	Maria Kristine Balmes	55,866	36.87%
Invalid or blank votes		9,682	6.39%
Total votes		141,829	100%

=== Vice Mayor ===
Incumbent Vice Mayor Emilio "Jun" Berberabe is running unopposed. He is Balmes' running mate.

Batangas City Vice Mayoralty Election
Party	Candidate	Votes	%
UNA	Emilio Berberabe Jr.	123,317	81.39%
Invalid or blank votes		28,194	18.61%
Total votes		151,511	100%

=== Councilors ===
==== Team Dimacuha ====
Liberal Party/Team Dimacuha
Name	Party
Glen Aldover	Liberal
Sergie Rex Atienza	Liberal
Karlos Emmanuel Buted	Liberal
Nelson Chavez	Nacionalista
Alyssa Renee dela Cruz-Atienza	Liberal
Gerardo Dela Roca	Liberal
Armando Lazarte	Liberal
Oliver Macatangay	Liberal
Aileen Grace Montalbo	Liberal
Juan Pedro Pastor	Liberal
Julian Villena	Liberal

==== Team Balmes ====
PDP–Laban/Team Balmes
Name	Party
Rosalina Abalos	PDP–Laban
Carlos Bagon	PDP–Laban
Aissa Dianne Marie Cabrera	PDP–Laban
Benjamin Espina, Jr.	PDP–Laban
Eduardo Garcia	PDP–Laban
Zester Carlo Hernandez	UNA
Raoul Mendoza	PDP–Laban
Porfirio Pagsinohin	PDP–Laban

2016 Batangas City Council Elections
Party	Candidate	Votes	%
Liberal	Aileen Grace Montalbo	86,725	
Liberal	Glenn Aldover	83,740	
Liberal	Sergie Rex Atienza	77,694	
PGP	Hamilton Blanco	76,001	
Liberal	Alyssa Renee dela Cruz-Atienza	73,298	
Liberal	Oliver Macatangay	62,432	
Liberal	Armando Lazarte	60,892	
Liberal	Karlos Emmanuel Buted	57,551	
Liberal	Julian Villena	56,809	
Liberal	Gerardo Dela Roca	55,859	
NPC	Nestor Dimacuha	52,683	
PGP	Nelson Chavez	50,289	
UNA	Zester Carlo Hernandez	48,680	
PMP	Micah Pargas	44,375	
Liberal	Juan Pedro Pastor	43,584	
Lakas	Michael Joel Guevarra	43,447	
Lakas	Mickel Borigas	40,763	
PDP–Laban	Aissa Dianne Marie Cabrera	24,481	
PDP–Laban	Benjamin Espina, Jr.	17,746	
PDP–Laban	Porfirio Pagsinohin	15,532	
PDP–Laban	Carlos Bagon	15,440	
Lakas	Frederick Cantos	14,864	
PDP–Laban	Rosalina Abalos	14,672	
PDP–Laban	Raoul Mendoza	10,846	
PDP–Laban	Eduardo Garcia	9,866	
PGP	Victorino Magpulhin	8,606	
Lakas	Juan William Ilagan	8,199	
Lakas	Zosimo Dimaandal	7,677	
PMP	Willord Tomulac	2,573	
PGP	Belen Betonio	1,594	
Total votes			
