= Beverley Dimacuha =

Mayor of Batangas City

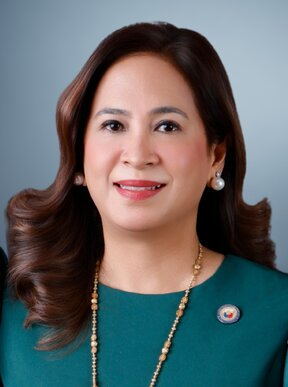
- Official portrait, 2025

Member of the Philippine House of Representatives from Batangas's 5th district
- Incumbent
- Assumed office June 30, 2025
- Preceded by: Marvey Mariño

Mayor of Batangas City
- In office June 30, 2016 – June 30, 2025
- Vice Mayor: Emilio Francisco Berberabe Jr. (2016–2022); Alyssa Cruz (2022–2025)
- Preceded by: Eddie Dimacuha
- Succeeded by: Marvey Mariño

Personal details
- Born: Beverley Rose Abaya Dimacuha; October 3, 1971 (age 55) Batangas City, Batangas, Philippines
- Party: Nacionalista (since 2018)
- Other political affiliations: Liberal (2015–2018)
- Spouse: Marvey Mariño (m. 1998)

Beverley Rose Abaya Dimacuha-Mariño (born October 3, 1971) is a Filipino politician who is the representative of Batangas's fifth district. Before being elected to Congress, she had served as the mayor of Batangas City from 2016 to 2025.

== Early life ==
Dimacuha was born on October 3, 1971, in Batangas City, Batangas, the youngest and only daughter of former mayors Eduardo Dimacuha and Vilma Dimacuha. She was born to a prominent political family in the city that has held the mayoralty since 1988.

== Mayor of Batangas City (2016–2025) ==
=== Elections ===
Dimacuha entered politics in 2016, when she substituted for his father, Eddie, after he withdrew his candidacy under the Liberal Party. She went on to defeat Councilor Kristine Balmes, a candidate under PDP–Laban. She was re-elected in 2019 unopposed. In 2022, she faced a challenge from Edu Garcia, whom she defeated in a landslide victory, securing a third and final term as mayor.

=== Tenure ===
Dimacuha was sworn in as mayor on June 30, 2016. During her tenure, Batangas City received the Seal of Good Local Governance (SGLG) twice from the Department of Interior and Local Government (DILG).

In 2023, Dimacuha led an initiative in collaboration with First Gen to convert a decommissioned two-hectare dumpsite into an eco-park. In August 2024, Batangas City received the Digital Cities Award, recognizing the city's efforts in job creation, sustainability, and innovation. This award was given in partnership with the Information and Communication Technology sector and the IT and Business Process Association of the Philippines.

== House of Representatives (from 2025) ==
=== Election ===
In the lead-up to the 2025 elections, reports surfaced that Dimacuha and her husband, Marvey Mariño, planned a political position swap, with Mariño running for mayor while Dimacuha sought her husband's congressional seat. Critics and opposition figures have accused the administration of using government resources to secure political influence, including bribery, the distribution of taxpayer-funded scholarships and health cards, and the use of public programs to gain votes.

She went on to win the election, defeating her opponent, Carlito Bisa, in a wide margin.
