= Balete, Batangas =

Municipality in Batangas, Philippines

Balete
- Municipality
- Municipality of Balete
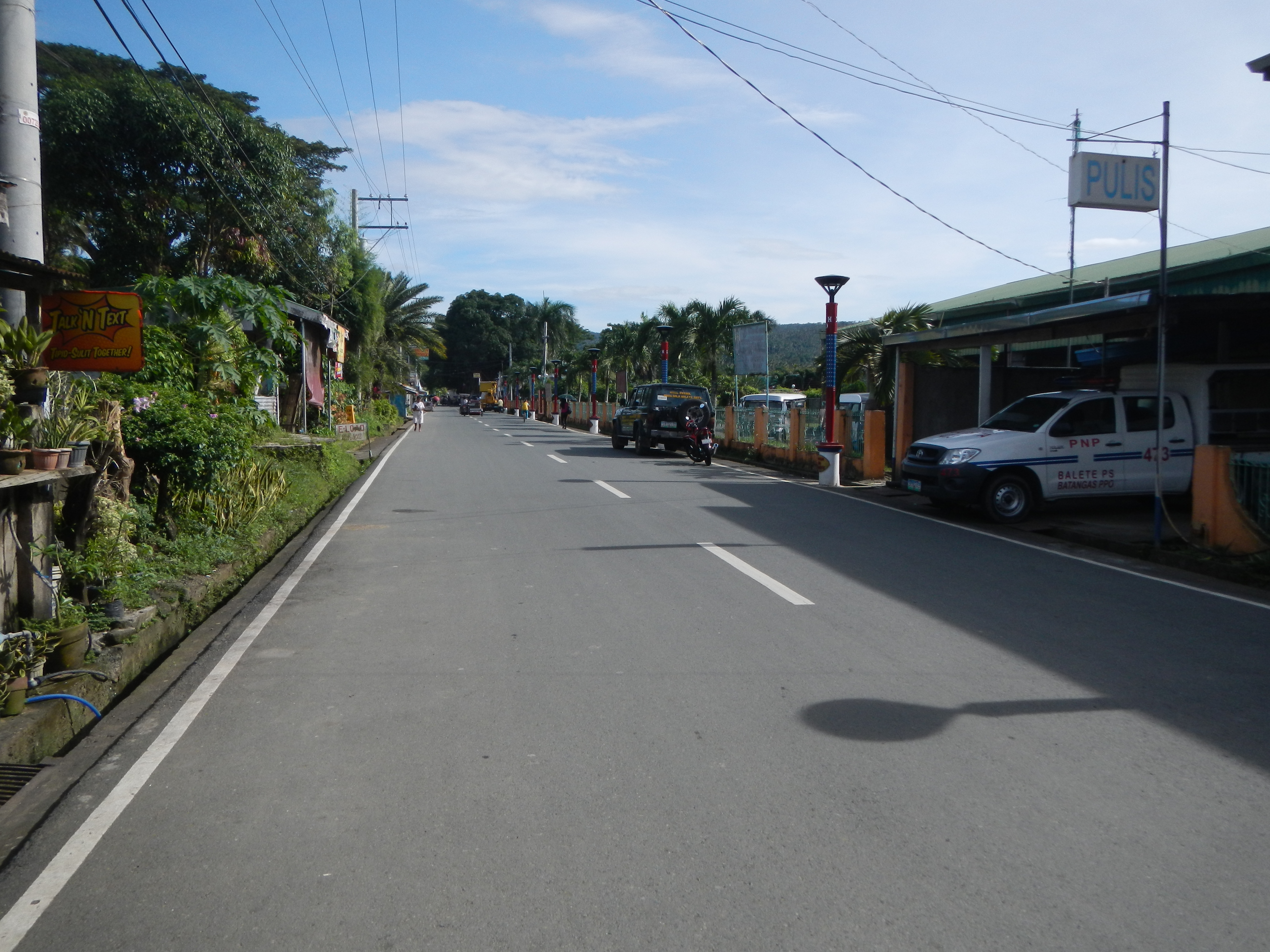
- Street in Balete

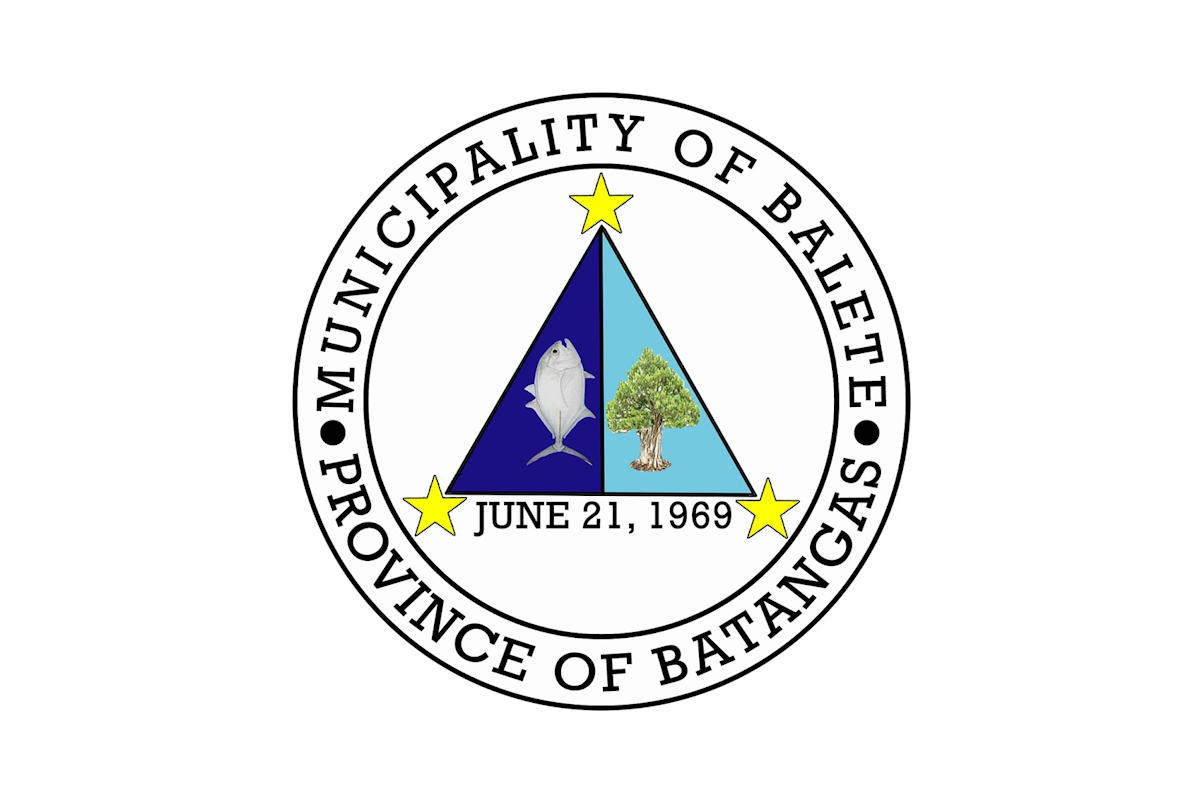
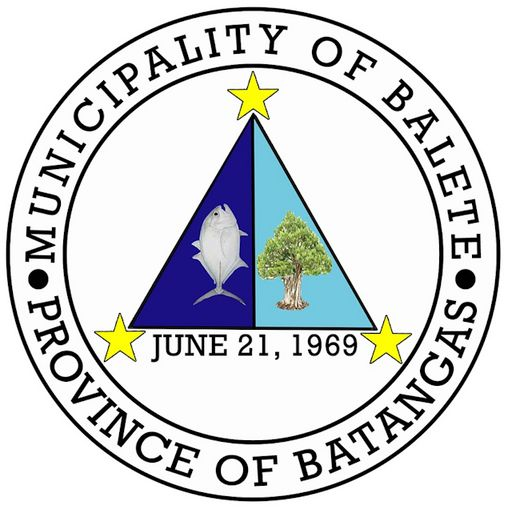
- Flag Seal

- Map of Batangas with Balete highlighted
- Interactive map of Balete
- Location within the Philippines
- Coordinates: 14°01′N 121°06′E
- Country: Philippines
- Region: Calabarzon
- Province: Batangas
- District: 3rd district
- Founded: June 21, 1969
- Named for: Balete tree
- Barangays: 13 (see Barangays)

Government
  - Type: Sangguniang Bayan
  - Mayor: Wilson V. Maralit
  - Vice Mayor: Alvin T. Payo
  - Representative: King George Leandro Antonio V. Collantes
  - Municipal Council: Members: Ronald V. Maralit; Rhyan K. Tasico; Raquel O. Maranan; Alvin A. Lumbera; Jose Ruel R. De Ocampo; Ralph Renz R. Lescano; Virgilio R. Del Mundo; Jimmy S. Magpantay
  - Electorate: 15,206 voters (2025)

Area
  - Total: 25.00 km^{2} (9.65 sq mi)
- Elevation: 187 m (614 ft)
- Highest elevation: 383 m (1,257 ft)
- Lowest elevation: 5 m (16 ft)

Population (2024 census)
  - Total: 24,202
  - Density: 968.1/km^{2} (2,507/sq mi)
  - Households: 5,709

Economy
  - Income class: 4th municipal income class
  - Poverty incidence: 9.55% (2023)
  - Revenue: ₱ 164.8 million (2024)
  - Assets: ₱ 405.9 million (2024)
  - Expenditure: ₱ 63.59 million (2024)
  - Liabilities: ₱ 187.1 million (2024)

Service provider
  - Electricity: Batangas 2 Electric Cooperative (BATELEC 2)
- Time zone: UTC+8 (PST)
- ZIP code: 4219
- PSGC: 0401004000
- IDD : area code: +63 (0)43
- Native languages: Tagalog

Balete, officially the Municipality of Balete (Tagalog: Bayan ng Balete), is a municipality in the province of Batangas, Philippines. According to the 2024 census, it has a population of 24,202 people. The people from Balete is called Baleteños.

It is well known for its location on Taal Lake, providing a panoramic view of the Taal Volcano. The pilgrimage site Marian Orchard is located in Barangay Malabanan. The town's name originates from the tree of the same name that grew abundantly in the area.

== History ==
Balete was once a barrio that was a part of Lipa. It was the site of Lipa's third municipal center from circa 1702 to 1754. Due to a Taal Volcano eruption, Lipa moved its center to its present location inland to seek refuge from further volcanic eruptions.

On June 21, 1969, barrios Malabanan, Looc, Alangilan, Palsara, Makina, Magapi, Solis, Sampalukan, Calawit, and Balete and the sitios of Sala, Paligawan, and Wani-Wani were separated from Lipa and constituted into a new independent municipality of Balete.

== Geography ==
According to the Philippine Statistics Authority, the municipality has a land area of 25.00 square kilometers (9.65 sq mi) constituting 0.80% of the 3,119.75-square-kilometer (1,204.54 sq mi) total area of Batangas.

=== Barangays ===
Balete is politically subdivided into 13 barangays, as indicated in the matrix below. Each barangay consists of puroks and some have sitios.

PSGC	Barangay	Population			±% p.a.	
		2024		2010		
041004001	Alangilan	5.9%	1,428	1,296	▴	0.68%
041004002	Calawit	4.2%	1,028	809	▴	1.68%
041004003	Looc	8.7%	2,098	2,005	▴	0.32%
041004004	Magapi	8.8%	2,133	1,947	▴	0.64%
041004005	Makina	7.3%	1,757	1,519	▴	1.02%
041004006	Malabanan	19.2%	4,637	4,119	▴	0.83%
041004007	Paligawan	8.5%	2,047	1,802	▴	0.89%
041004008	Palsara	5.7%	1,391	1,381	▴	0.05%
041004009	Poblacion	10.6%	2,573	2,405	▴	0.47%
041004010	Sala	7.2%	1,753	1,429	▴	1.43%
041004011	Sampalocan	4.5%	1,086	1,003	▴	0.55%
041004012	Solis	7.1%	1,712	1,634	▴	0.32%
041004013	San Sebastian	4.2%	1,018	1,865	▾	−4.12%
	Total		24,202	20,214	▴	1.26%

=== Climate ===
Climate data for Balete, Batangas
Month	Jan	Feb	Mar	Apr	May	Jun	Jul	Aug	Sep	Oct	Nov	Dec	Year
Mean daily maximum °C (°F)	29 (84)	30 (86)	31 (88)	33 (91)	32 (90)	30 (86)	29 (84)	29 (84)	29 (84)	29 (84)	29 (84)	29 (84)	30 (86)
Mean daily minimum °C (°F)	20 (68)	20 (68)	21 (70)	22 (72)	24 (75)	24 (75)	24 (75)	24 (75)	24 (75)	23 (73)	22 (72)	21 (70)	22 (72)
Average precipitation mm (inches)	11 (0.4)	13 (0.5)	14 (0.6)	32 (1.3)	101 (4.0)	142 (5.6)	208 (8.2)	187 (7.4)	175 (6.9)	131 (5.2)	68 (2.7)	39 (1.5)	1,121 (44.3)
Average rainy days	5.2	5.0	7.4	11.5	19.8	23.5	27.0	25.9	25.2	23.2	15.5	8.3	197.5
Source: Meteoblue (Use with caution: this is modeled/calculated data, not measured locally.)

== Demographics ==
Population census of Balete
Year	Pop.	±% p.a.
1970	7,134	—
1975	8,229	+2.91%
1980	8,698	+1.11%
1990	11,678	+2.99%
1995	14,383	+3.98%
2000	15,792	+2.02%
2007	19,252	+2.77%
2010	20,214	+1.79%
2015	22,661	+2.20%
2020	24,055	+1.26%
2024	24,202	+0.15%
Source: Philippine Statistics Authority

In the 2024 census, Balete had a population of 24,202 people. The population density was 970 inhabitants per square kilometer (2,500/sq mi).

== Economy ==
Poverty incidence of Balete

Source: Philippine Statistics Authority

== Education ==
The Balete Schools District Office governs all educational institutions within the municipality. It oversees the management and operations of all private and public, from primary to secondary schools.

=== Primary and elementary schools ===
- Balete Central School
- Balete Family Farm School
- Cesar Orona Elementary School
- Cyber Kids School of Learning
- Looc Elementary School
- Magapi Elementary School
- Malabanan Elementary School
- Our Lady of Fatima Educational System
- Paligawan Elementary School
- Palsara Elementary School
- Solis Elementary School

=== Secondary schools ===
- Balete National High School
- Emilia L. Malabanan Integrated School
- Primitivo Kalaw Senior High School

== Gallery ==
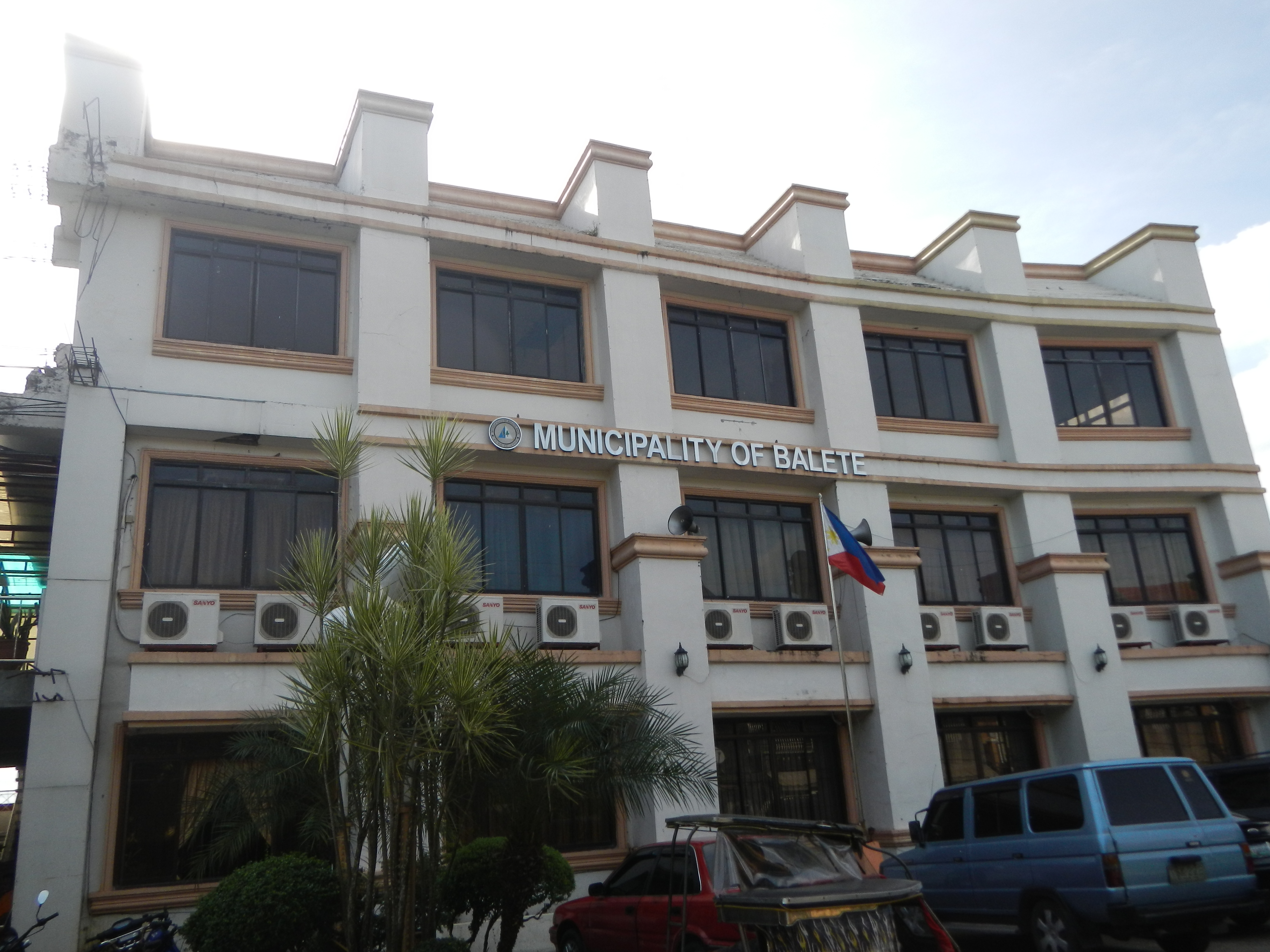
Municipal hall

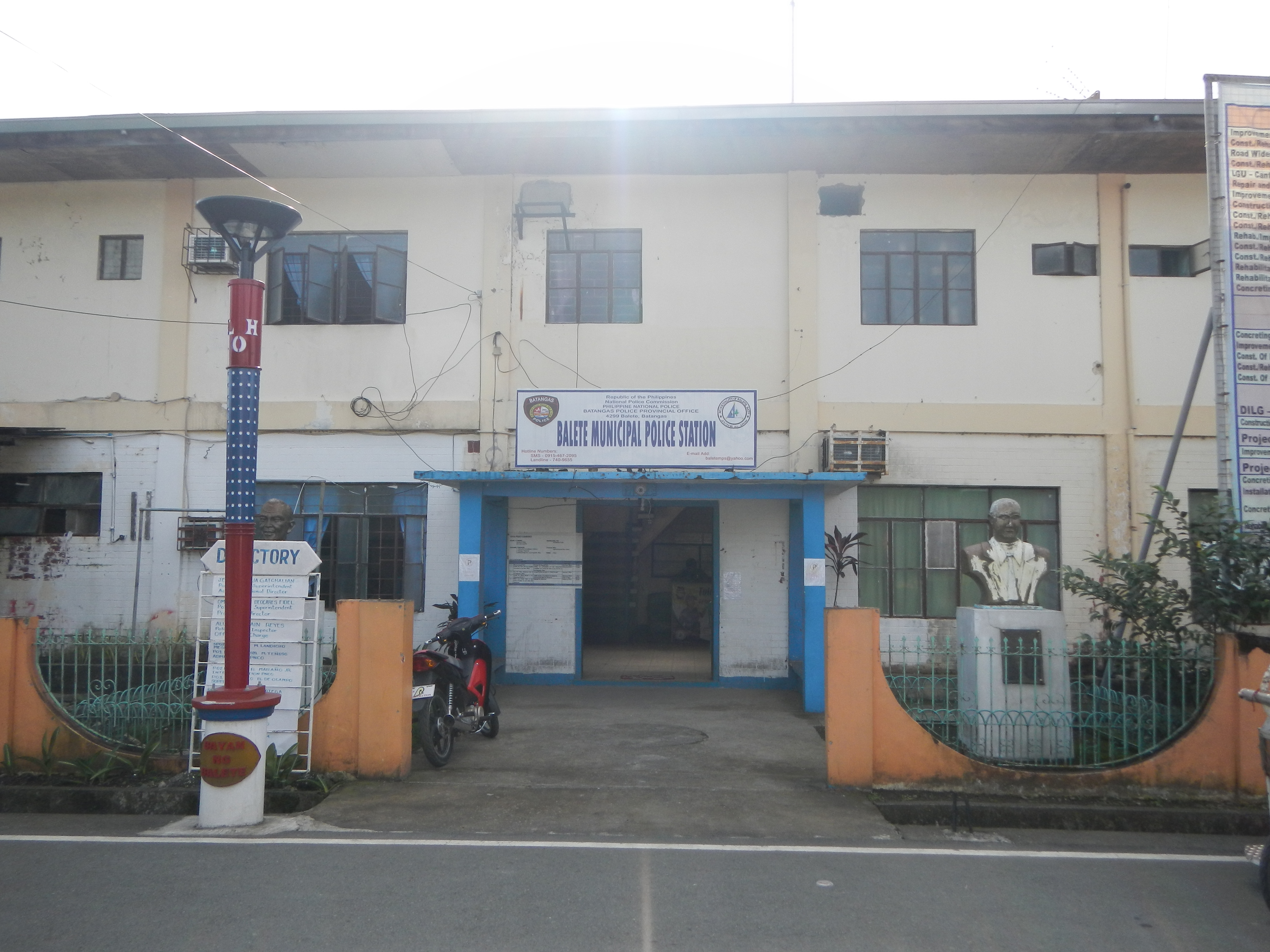
Police station

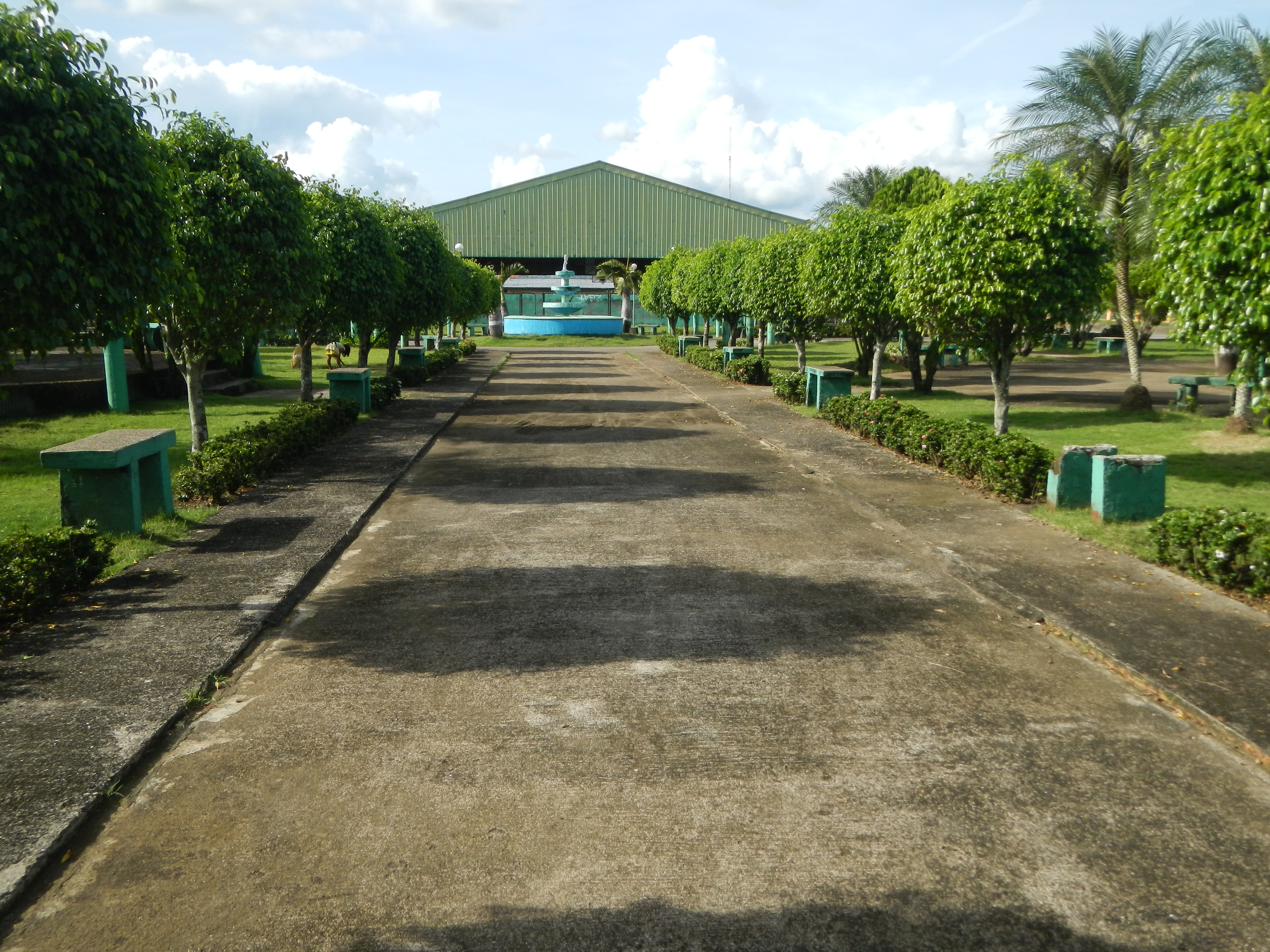
Municipal park

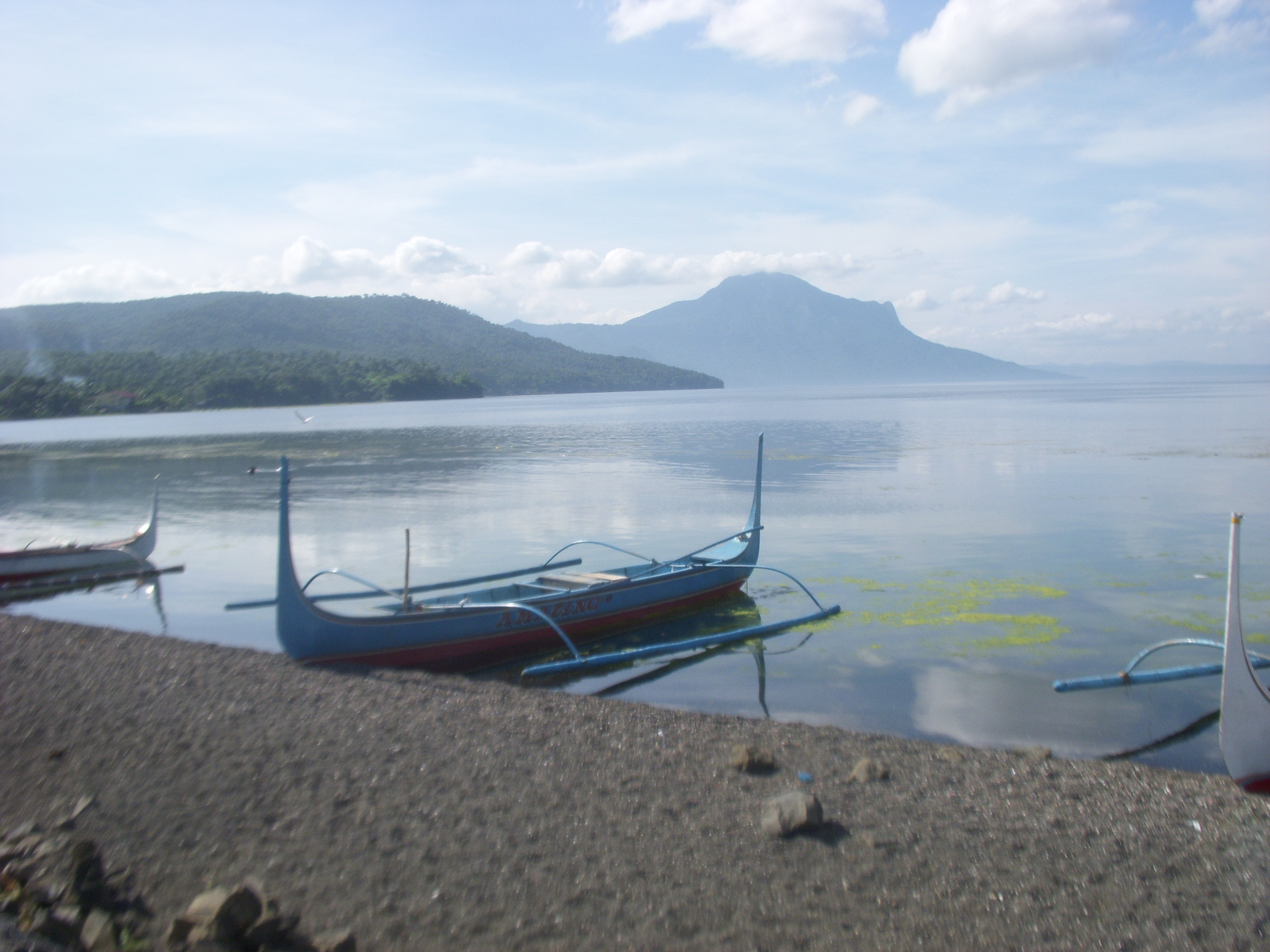
Fishing boats on the shore of Taal Lake

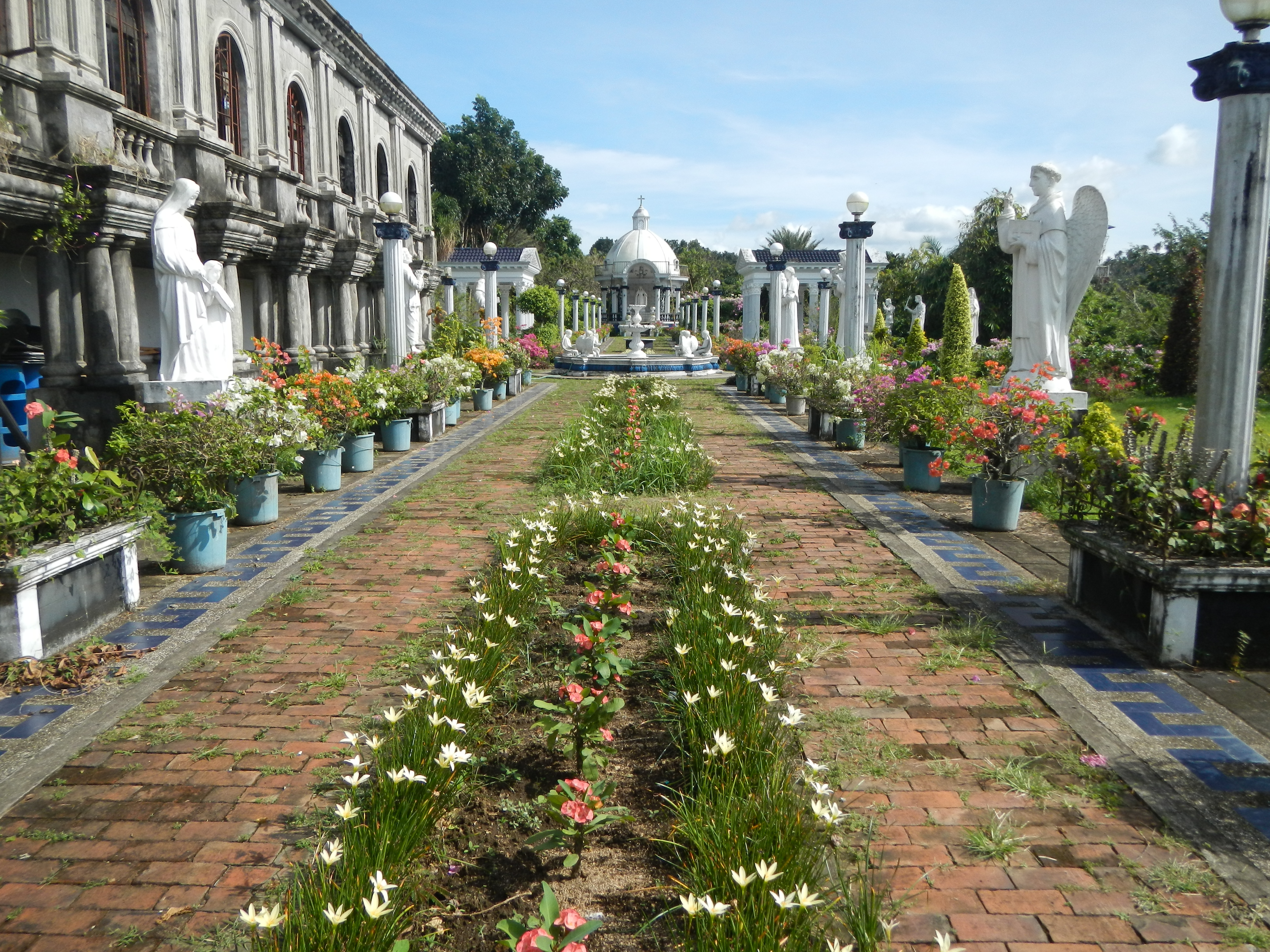
Marian Orchard
