= Batangas's 5th congressional district =

House of Representatives of the Philippines legislative district

Batangas' 5th congressional district
- Constituency for the House of Representatives of the Philippines
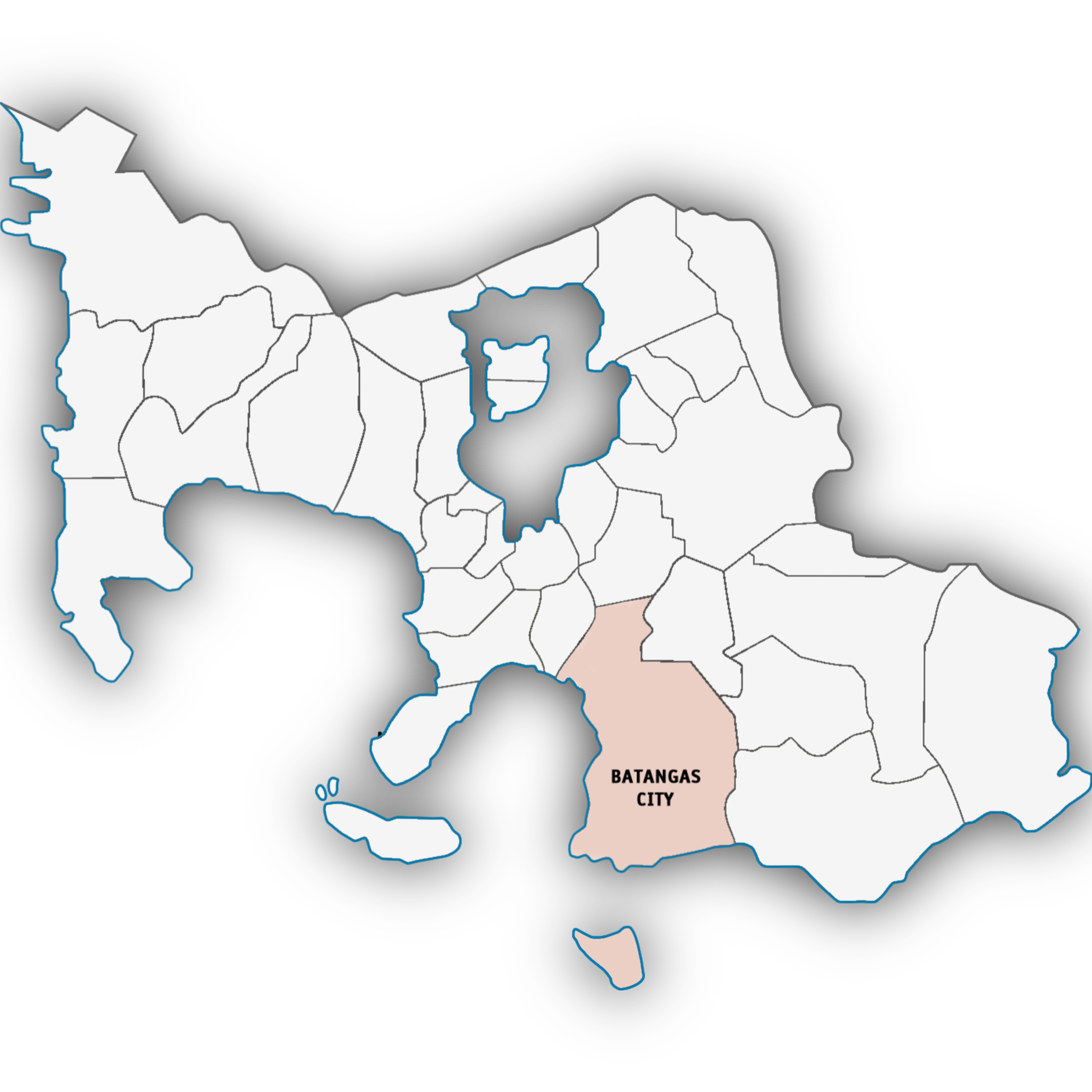
- Boundary of Batangas's 5th congressional district in Batangas

- Location of Batangas within the Philippines
- Province: Batangas
- Region: Calabarzon
- Population: 351,437 (2020)
- Electorate: 228,263 (2025)
- Major settlements: Batangas City
- Area: 282.96 km^{2} (109.25 sq mi)

Current constituency
- Created: 2015
- Representative: Beverley Dimacuha
- Political party: Nacionalista
- Congressional bloc: Majority

Batangas' 5th congressional district is one of the six congressional districts of the Philippines in the province of Batangas. It has been represented in the House of Representatives of the Philippines since 2016. The district consists of Batangas City, the provincial capital. It is currently represented in the 20th Congress by Beverley Dimacuha of the Nacionalista Party (NP).

== Representation history ==
#	Image	Member	Term of office		Legislature	Party	Electoral history	Constituent LGUs
#	Image	Member	Start	End	Legislature	Party	Electoral history	Constituent LGUs
=== Batangas's 5th district for the House of Representatives of the Philippines ===
District created August 19, 2015 from Batangas's 2nd district.
1		Marvey Mariño	June 30, 2016	June 30, 2025	17th	Liberal	Elected in 2016.	2016–present Batangas City
1		Marvey Mariño	June 30, 2016	June 30, 2025	18th	Nacionalista	Re-elected in 2019.	2016–present Batangas City
1		Marvey Mariño	June 30, 2016	June 30, 2025	19th	Nacionalista	Re-elected in 2022.	2016–present Batangas City
2		Beverley Dimacuha	June 30, 2025	Incumbent	20th	Nacionalista	Elected in 2025.	2016–present Batangas City

== Election results ==
=== 2025 ===
2025 Philippine House of Representatives election in Batangas's 5th District
Party	Candidate	Votes	%
Nacionalista	Beverley Rose Dimacuha	156,049	87.30%
Makabayan	Carlito Bisa	22,698	12.70%
Total votes		178,747	100.00
Nacionalista hold			

=== 2022 ===
2022 Philippine House of Representatives elections
Party	Candidate	Votes	%
Nacionalista	Marvey Mariño	156,530	91.98%
Ang Kapatiran	Carlito Bisa	13,645	8.02%
Total votes		170,175	100.00
Nacionalista hold			

=== 2019 ===
2019 Philippine House of Representatives elections
Party	Candidate	Votes	%
Nacionalista	Marvey Mariño	132,286	100.00
Total votes		132,286	100.00
Nacionalista hold			

=== 2016 ===
2016 Philippine House of Representatives elections
Party	Candidate	Votes	%
Liberal	Marvey Mariño	69,577	45.92%
UNA	Danilo Berberabe	46,967	31.00%
Independent	Hernando Perez	15,951	10.52%
Independent	Felipe Baroja	5,587	3.69%
Independent	Carlito Bisa	4,145	2.74%
Margin of victory		22,610	14.92%
Valid ballots		142,227	93.87%
Invalid or blank votes		9,284	6.13%
Total votes		151,511	100%
Liberal win (new seat)			

== See also ==
- Legislative districts of Batangas
