= Marvey Mariño =

House of Representatives of the Philippines

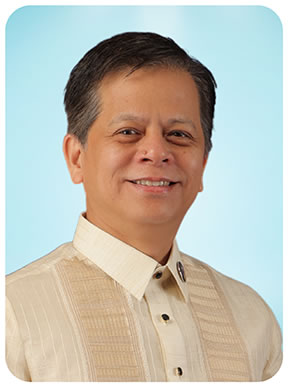
- Official portrait, 2022

Mayor of Batangas City
- Incumbent
- Assumed office June 30, 2025
- Vice Mayor: Alyssa Cruz
- Preceded by: Beverley Dimacuha

Member of the Philippine House of Representatives from Batangas's 5th district
- In office June 30, 2016 – June 30, 2025
- Preceded by: Position established
- Succeeded by: Beverley Dimacuha

Member of the Batangas Provincial Board from the 2nd district
- In office June 30, 2013 – June 30, 2016

Member of the Batangas City Council
- In office June 30, 2007 – June 30, 2013

Personal details
- Born: October 3, 1970 (age 55) Batangas City, Batangas, Philippines
- Party: Nacionalista (2018–present)
- Other political affiliations: Liberal (2015–2018); NPC (2012-2015); Lakas-CMD (2008-2012); KAMPI (2007-2008)
- Spouse: Beverley Rose A. Dimacuha (m. 1998)

Mario Vittorio "Marvey" Agregado Mariño (born October 3, 1970) is a Filipino politician currently serving as the mayor of Batangas City since 2025. He previously served as the representative of Batangas's 5th congressional district from 2016 to 2025. During his tenure in the House of Representatives, Mariño held key positions, including Chairperson of the House Committee on Government Reorganization and later the House Committee on Trade and Industry.

== Political career ==
=== Local government ===
Mariño began his political career as a city councilor of Batangas City in 2007. He later served as a member of the Batangas Provincial Board, being elected in 2013 under the Nationalist People's Coalition.

=== House of Representatives ===
In 2016, following the creation of Batangas's 5th congressional district, Mariño was elected as its first representative, winning a five-way race that included former congressman Hernando Perez. Running under the Liberal Party, he secured 69,577 votes.

During his tenure, Mariño co-authored the Maharlika Investment Corporation bill and voted in favor of the death penalty bill. He faced a vote-buying complaint in the 2016 elections. He also provided financial and medical assistance to constituents through his office.

In the 2019 elections, Mariño ran unopposed under the Nacionalista Party and was re-elected with 132,286 votes.

In the 2022 elections, he defeated Carlito Bisa of the Ang Kapatiran party, securing 156,530 votes or 91.98% of the total votes. During this term, he served as the chairman of the House Committee on Trade and Industry.

=== Mayor of Batangas City ===
In 2025, Mariño ran for mayor of Batangas City, switching roles with his wife, incumbent mayor Beverley Dimacuha, who ran for his congressional seat. Mariño won the mayoral race with 116,487 votes, defeating Clemente Berberabe, who garnered 68,857 votes. He assumed office on June 30, 2025.

== Personal life ==
Mariño is married to Beverley Dimacuha, who served as mayor of Batangas City from 2016 to 2025 and is the representative of Batangas's 5th congressional district.
