= Tropical Storm Haikui (2017) =

Pacific tropical storm in 2017

Tropical Storm Haikui (Salome)
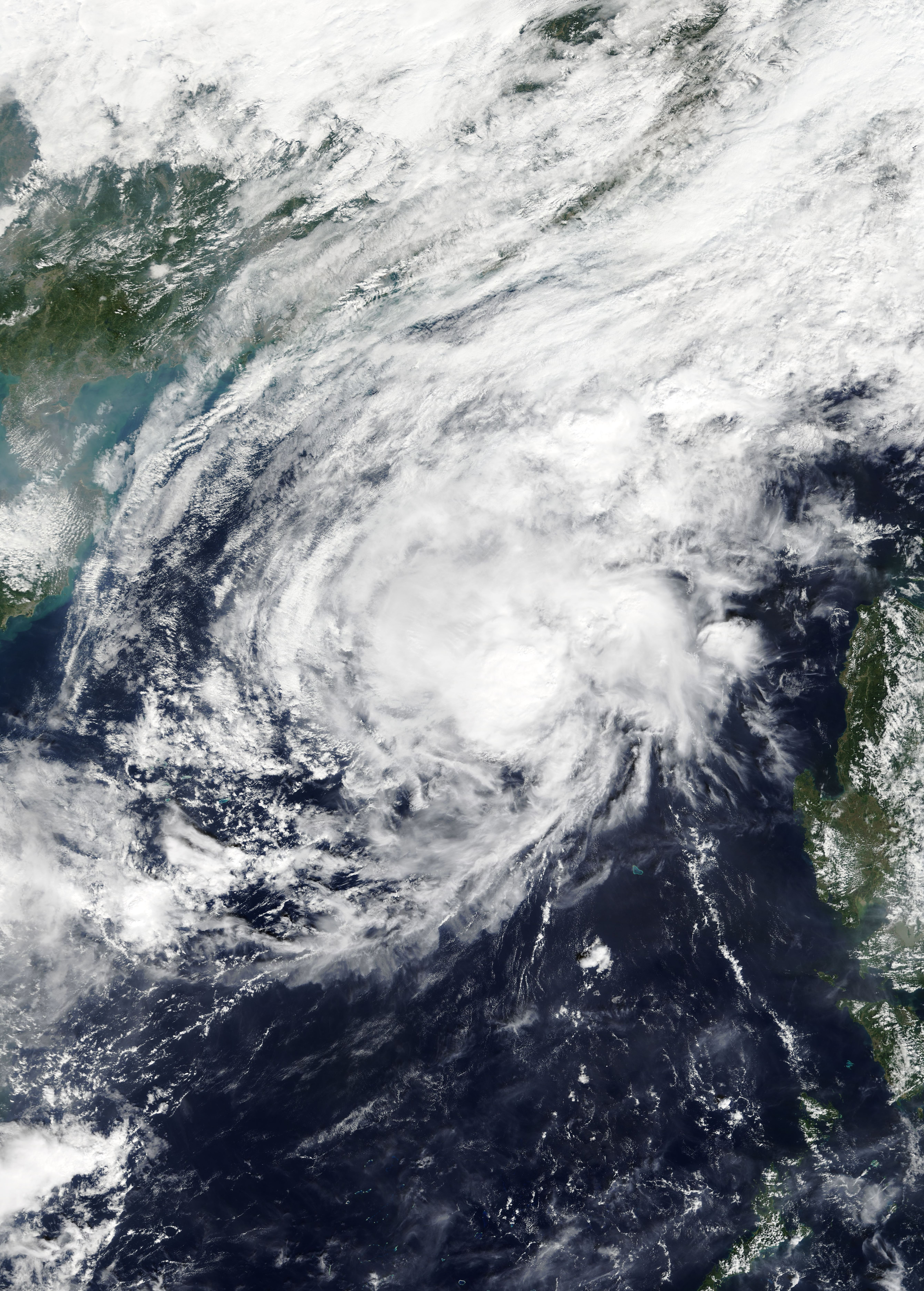
- Tropical Storm Haikui at peak intensity on November 11

Meteorological history
- Formed: November 7, 2017
- Dissipated: November 13, 2017

Tropical storm
- 10-minute sustained (JMA)
- Highest winds: 75 km/h (45 mph)
- Lowest pressure: 998 hPa (mbar); 29.47 inHg

Tropical storm
- 1-minute sustained (SSHWS/JTWC)
- Highest winds: 85 km/h (50 mph)
- Lowest pressure: 989 hPa (mbar); 29.21 inHg

Overall effects
- Fatalities: None
- Damage: $4.26 million (2017 USD)
- Areas affected: Philippines, South China, Central Vietnam
- IBTrACS
- Part of the 2017 Pacific typhoon season

Tropical Storm Haikui, known in the Philippines as Tropical Storm Salome, was a weak tropical cyclone that affected the Philippine archipelagos of Luzon and Visayas in early-November 2017. Forming as the twenty-fourth named storm of the 2017 typhoon season, Haikui developed as a tropical depression to the east of Samar on November 9. Traversing some Philippine islands, the system gradually intensified into a named tropical storm by November 10. In that same day, Haikui emerged to the South China Sea. By November 12, the Japan Meteorological History downgraded the storm into a tropical depression. The storm dissipated on November 13, while meteorologists from the USA recorded the storm until November 14.

In preparation for the storm, Tropical Cyclone Signals were raised in 15 provinces in the Philippines. The storm created heavy rainfall in Luzon, suspending classes in the archipelago. The storm also affected China, with floods and heavy rainfall in some parts of China. In total, the storm caused 4.26 million US dollars in damage.

== Meteorological history ==
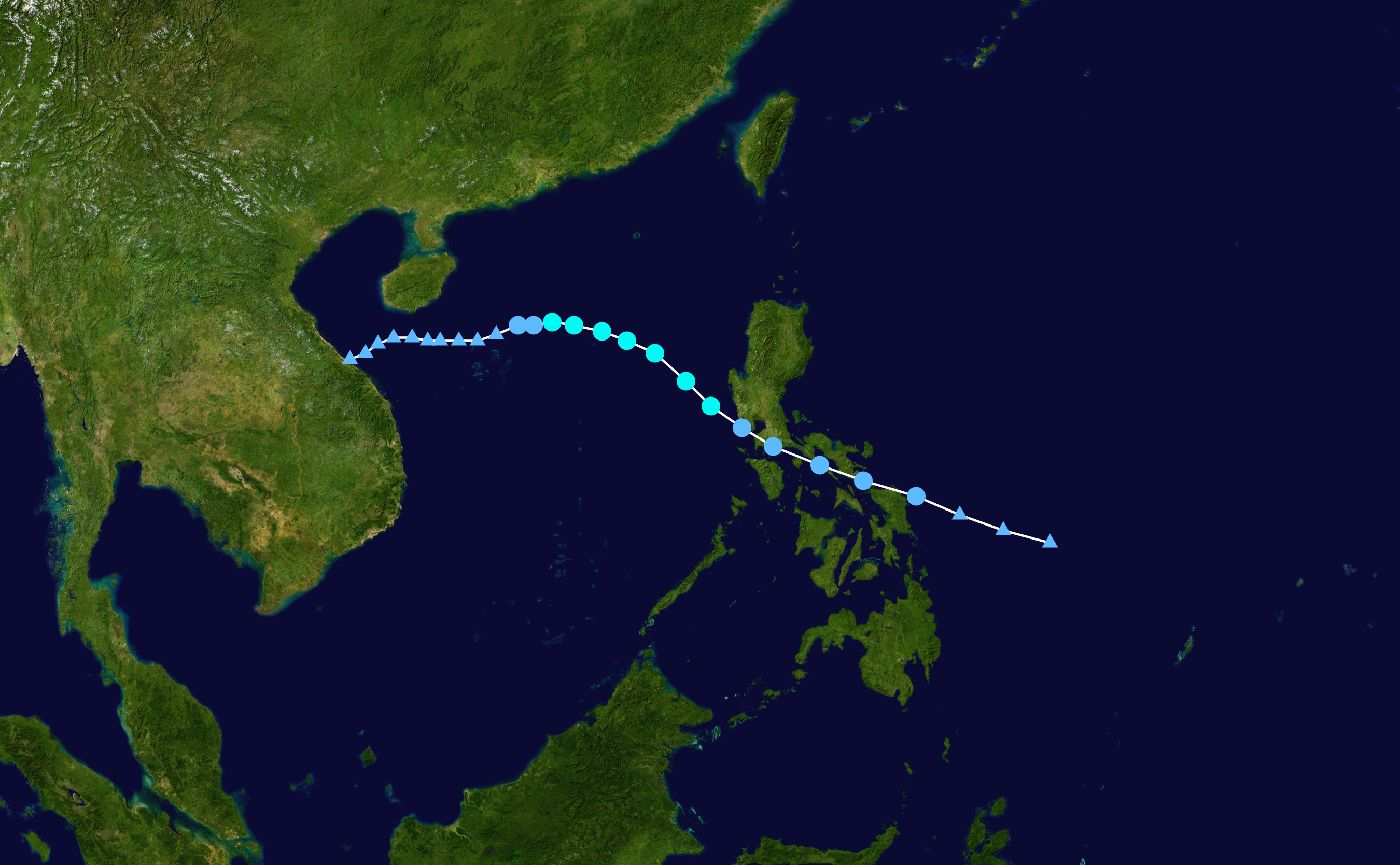
Map plotting the storm's track and intensity, according to the Saffir–Simpson scale Map key Saffir–Simpson scale Tropical depression (≤38 mph, ≤62 km/h) Tropical storm (39–73 mph, 63–118 km/h) Category 1 (74–95 mph, 119–153 km/h) Category 2 (96–110 mph, 154–177 km/h) Category 3 (111–129 mph, 178–208 km/h) Category 4 (130–156 mph, 209–251 km/h) Category 5 (≥157 mph, ≥252 km/h) Unknown Storm type Tropical cyclone Subtropical cyclone Extratropical cyclone, remnant low, tropical disturbance, or monsoon depression

On November 8, a tropical disturbance had developed about 709 km (441 mi) southeast of Sorsogon. After some expanding, the Joint Typhoon Warning Center (JTWC) issued a Tropical Cyclone Formation Alert. By 00:00 UTC of November 9, the PAGASA began tracking on the system, giving the local name Salome. The JTWC issued their first advisory on Salome three hours later, designating the system as 30W. The Japan Meteorological Agency (JMA) followed suit a few hours later, as they classified it as a tropical depression with winds of 55 km/h (35 mph). Satellite imagery found a consolidating low-level circulation center (LLCC) with convective banding wrapping into it. By 12:00 UTC of the same day, the JMA upgraded the system to a tropical storm, naming it Haikui, (Note: The name Haikui (Mandarin: 海葵, [xaɪ˨˩˦ kʰweɪ˧˥]) was contributed by China and means sea anemone in Mandarin.) the twenty-fourth named storm of the season. Around the same time it was named, the PAGASA indicated that Haikui made landfall in San Juan, Batangas, cutting the Ticao Pass.

While traversing Southern Luzon, Haikui's LLCC became defined while its structure had greatly improved with a convective structure. Despite a slight deterioration of its structure with some warming in its cloud tops, Haikui was located over in a favorable environment with "very" warm sea-surface temperatures of 30 °C (86 °F), a low shear and a pronounced poleward outflow. By November 10, the JTWC finally upgraded Haikui to a tropical storm after a sudden burst of deep convection occurred near its center. In that time, the storm was located 55 kilometres (34 mi) southwest of Subic, Zambales. Because of the burst, the storm weakened, with fragile convection and a fully exposed LLCC. By November 12, the Japan Meteorological Agency issued their final advisory on the storm, downgrading the storm to a tropical depression. The storm dissipated on November 13, with the USA recording the storm until November 14.

== Preparations and impact ==
=== Philippines ===
On November 9, as soon as the PAGASA started issuing advisories on the system, Tropical Cyclone Signal #1 was raised to 15 provinces over in the Bicol Region, Western Visayas and Calabarzon. The National Disaster Risk Reduction and Management Council (NDRRMC) had immediately announced to suspend all trips from the Batangas Port. Warning was also raised for sea travel over in the storm signal-raised areas due to moderate and rough seas. By November 10, the PAGASA had raised the Tropical Cyclone Signal #2 over in Metro Manila, Laguna and Batangas after Haikui (Salome) strengthened into a tropical storm. Any other tropical cyclone signals were also extended to Central Luzon (Region III) and provinces of Zambales. Estimated rainfall was ranging from the categories of moderate to heavy within the 250 km-diameter of the storm. The public and management councils were already advised to take actions. The PAGASA had also warned on possibilities of further landslides and flooding to provinces further north, especially in the Ilocos Region (Region I) and the Cagayan Valley (Region II). Classes over in the capital region and nearby cities and provinces were suspended on November 10.

Satellite animation of Tropical Storm Haikui making landfall over San Juan, Batangas on November 9.

Some domestic and international flights were canceled on November 9. More than 700 passengers were stranded over in ports of Southern Luzon and Eastern Visayas. The Office of Civil Defense of Mimaropa region stated that 247 of those were over in Mindoro. About 13 boats were destroyed in Tabaco City, Albay due to rough current. However two boats carrying passengers and cargoes were stopped over in the Balanacan Port in Marinduque. The storm also caused some landslides and rockslides to occur in Samar, which blocked major roads. Nine villages in Batangas also experienced power outages as well as rising water levels of the Calumpang River, prompting nearby residents to prepare and evacuate. In Siniloan, Laguna, 15 barangays were flooded with a landslide that covered and damaged a house. Camarines Sur also experienced damaged agricultural crops due to flooding as well as knocked-down trees due to gusty winds. An extra 300 passengers were stranded along a port in Romblon. In the afternoon of November 10, Rappler reported that no areas were in any more alerts. As of November 11, the Department of Social Welfare and Development (DWSD) had recorded a total of 126 families who were affected by the storm, while 10 families were still staying in an evacuation center in Dipaculao, Aurora.

On November 14, the NDRRMC had recorded a total of 15 suspended classes over in some regions during November 9–10. Seven road sections were not passable and in Dipaculao, Aurora, five houses were damaged. Majority of the damages were recorded over in the region of Calabarzon and was totaled up to Php218.5 million (US$4.26 million). Local Government Units in Batangas counted three missing boats, with 11 missing people on board. PAGASA counted 5,673 directly impacted individuals and another count of Php277.277 million damages (US$4.99 million). In Dipaculao, Aurora, 39 people were affected, with five damaged houses. While in Maria Aurora, Aurora, 271 people were affected.

=== China and Hong Kong ===
On November 13 and 14, Haikui produced heavy, sustained rain in the island province of Hainan, China. Flooding was recorded in several locations on the east side of the province. In the capital Haikou, flooding caused road closure. The Hong Kong Observatory also watched the storm, though posing no threat to Hong Kong. The storm was joined by a southwest monsoon, increasing the heavy rain.

== Aftermath ==
In Calabarzon, local government units provided hot meals and assistance to the evacuees. The Department of Social Welfare and Development coordinated with local governments to rescue individuals.

== See also ==
- Weather of 2017
- Tropical cyclones in 2017
- Tropical Storm Merbok (2004)
- Tropical Depression Winnie (2004)
- Typhoon Rammasun (2014)
- Tropical Storm Tokage (2016)
- Tropical Storm Sonca (2017)
- Typhoon Doksuri (2017)
- Tropical Storm Nalgae (2022)
