= Calumpang =

Calumpang may refer to:

- Calumpang, Marikina, a barangay in the Philippines
- Calumpang River, in Batangas, Philippines
- Calumpang family, Filipino political family
- Sterculia foetida, a wild almond tree common in rural areas of the Philippines
