= Sublian Festival =

Annual religious event in the Philippines

- Status: Active
- Genre: Cultural, Religious
- Date: July 23 (culmination)
- Frequency: Annual
- Locations: Batangas City, Philippines
- Years active: 1988–present
- Founder: Eduardo Dimacuha
- Patrons: Holy Cross, Santo Niño

Sublian Festival is an annual religious and cultural festival held in Batangas City, Philippines. The festival lasts for two weeks and culminates on July 23, coinciding with the city's founding anniversary. It honors the town patrons: the Holy Cross in Bauan and Agoncillo, and the Santo Niño (Holy Child) in Batangas City.

The festival is recognized by the Department of Tourism and is included in their Calendar of Events.

== Etymology ==
The festival's name is derived from the "Subli", a traditional dance indigenous to the province of Batangas. The term "Subli" is a portmanteau of two Tagalog words: subsub (meaning "falling on the head") and bali (meaning "broken" or "bent"). This etymology reflects the movements of the male dancers, who appear to be lame or crooked during the performance.

== History ==
=== Origin of the dance ===
According to local folklore, the Subli dance originated in the town of Alitagtag during the Spanish colonial era in 1595. The story involves a woman who found a crucifix (Holy Cross) near a tree while gathering water. It is said that a miracle occurred where her pail filled with water as she prayed before the cross. The Subli was originally a ceremonial worship dance performed in front of the Holy Cross.

=== Establishment of the festival ===
The modern Sublian Festival was established on July 23, 1988, by then-Mayor Eduardo Dimacuha. It was created to coincide with the annual observance of Batangas City's cityhood. The primary objective of the festival was to revive the cultural practice of the Subli dance, which is considered a symbol of the Batangueño identity.

By 2025, the festival marked its 38th year with the theme "Masaya ang Sama-sama, Tuloy-tuloy na Pag-unlad" (transl. Happiness in Togetherness, Continuous Progress). The Cultural Center of the Philippines has recognized the Batangas City government as a regional art center in Luzon for its efforts in cultural preservation.

== The Subli dance ==
The core of the festival is the performance of the Subli. It is a devotional dance that combines poetry, movement, and music, typically accompanied by drums and chanting.

=== Variations ===
Academic research indicates that the Subli has evolved into different renditions across the province. Dr. Elvira Rivera-Mirano noted three distinct styles associated with specific locations:

- Sinala: A version originating from Barangay Sinala in Bauan.
- Pook: A version originating from Barangay Pook in Agoncillo.
- Talumpok: A version originating from Barangay Talumpok in Batangas City.

The Talumpok version is often considered the oldest and serves as the basis for the street dancing competitions held during the festival.

== Activities ==
The festival spans two weeks and includes various traditional and cultural events.

- Sublian sa Kalye: This is the street dancing component of the festival. Participants, including students and city employees, march and dance the Subli on the streets wearing native attire and adorned hats.
- Lupakan at Awitan: This event combines food and music. Lupakan involves the making of nilupak, a local delicacy made from mashed bananas and sweet potato. Awitan refers to the singing of folk songs.
- Malunggayan Fiesta: A day dedicated to celebrating the nutritional benefits of the malunggay (moringa) plant.
- Entertainment events: Major Philippine television networks GMA Network and ABS-CBN actively participate in the festival by staging "Kapuso Mall Shows" and "Kapamilya Karavans" featuring local celebrities.

== Awards ==
In 2020, the Sublian Festival was recognized as the "Most Outstanding Religious Festival" at the Philippine Live Entertainment and Arts Festival (LEAF) Awards.
