= Batangas City =

Capital city of Batangas, Philippines

- Component city
- City of Batangas
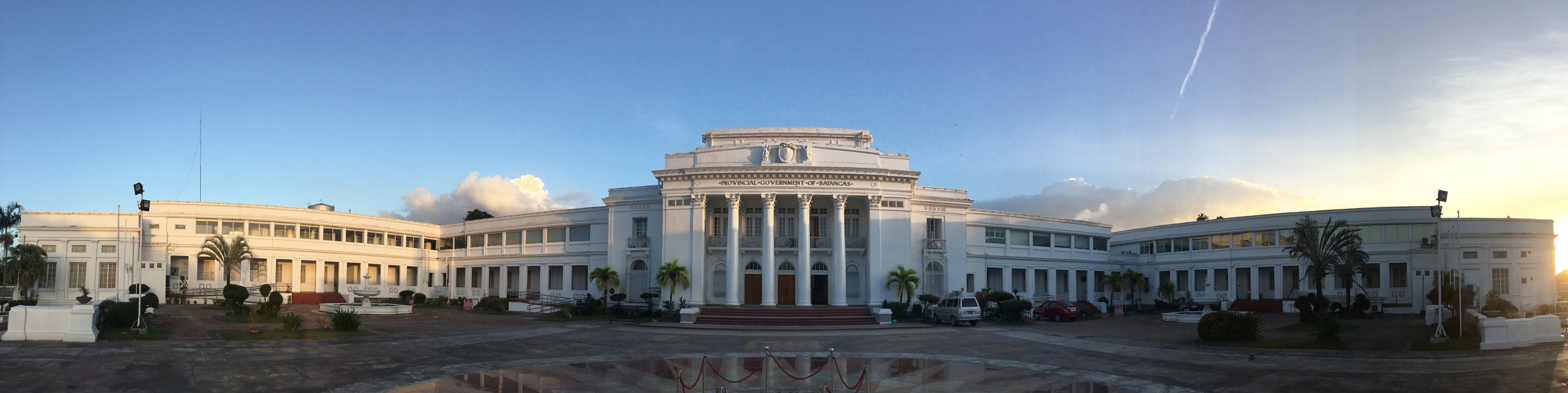
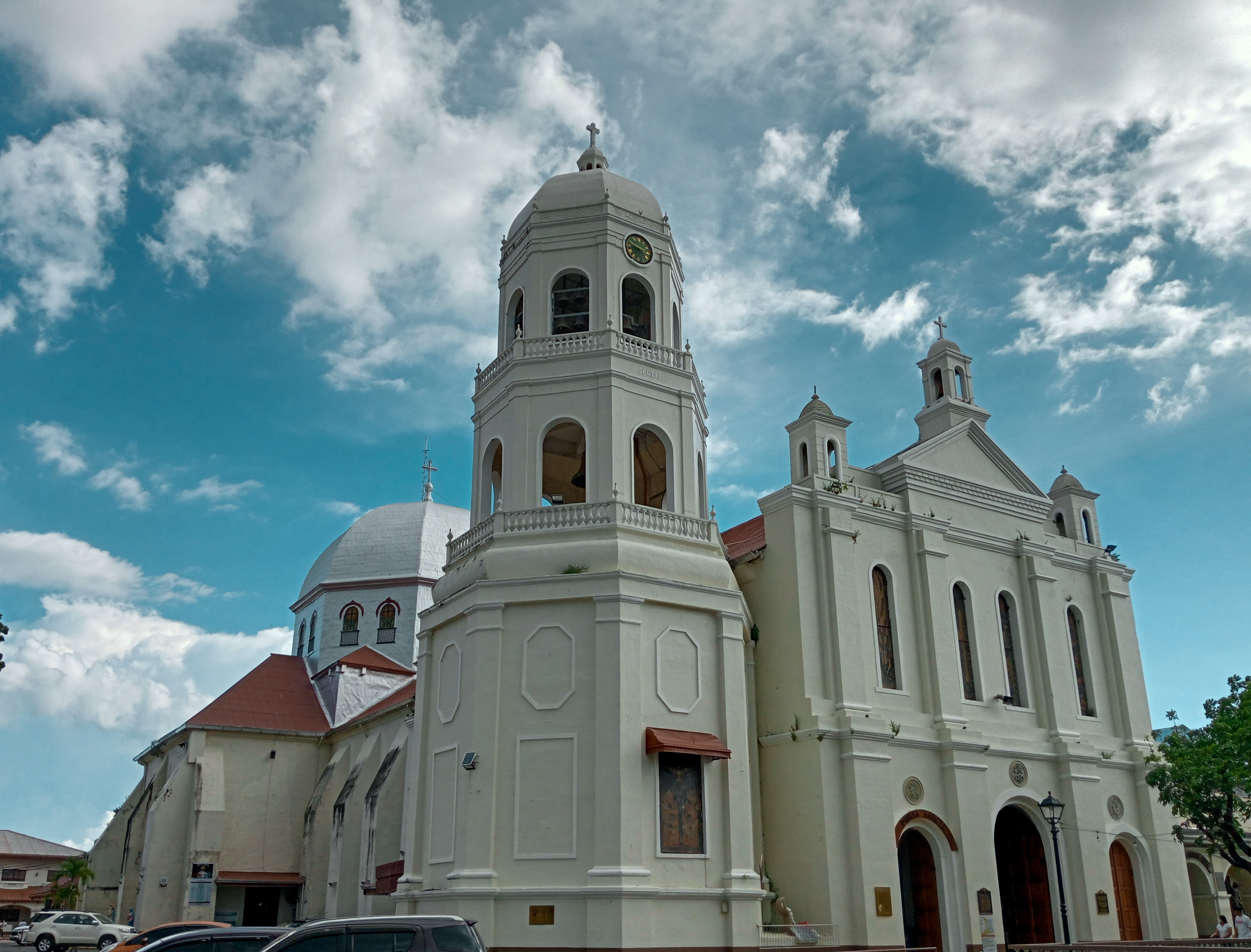
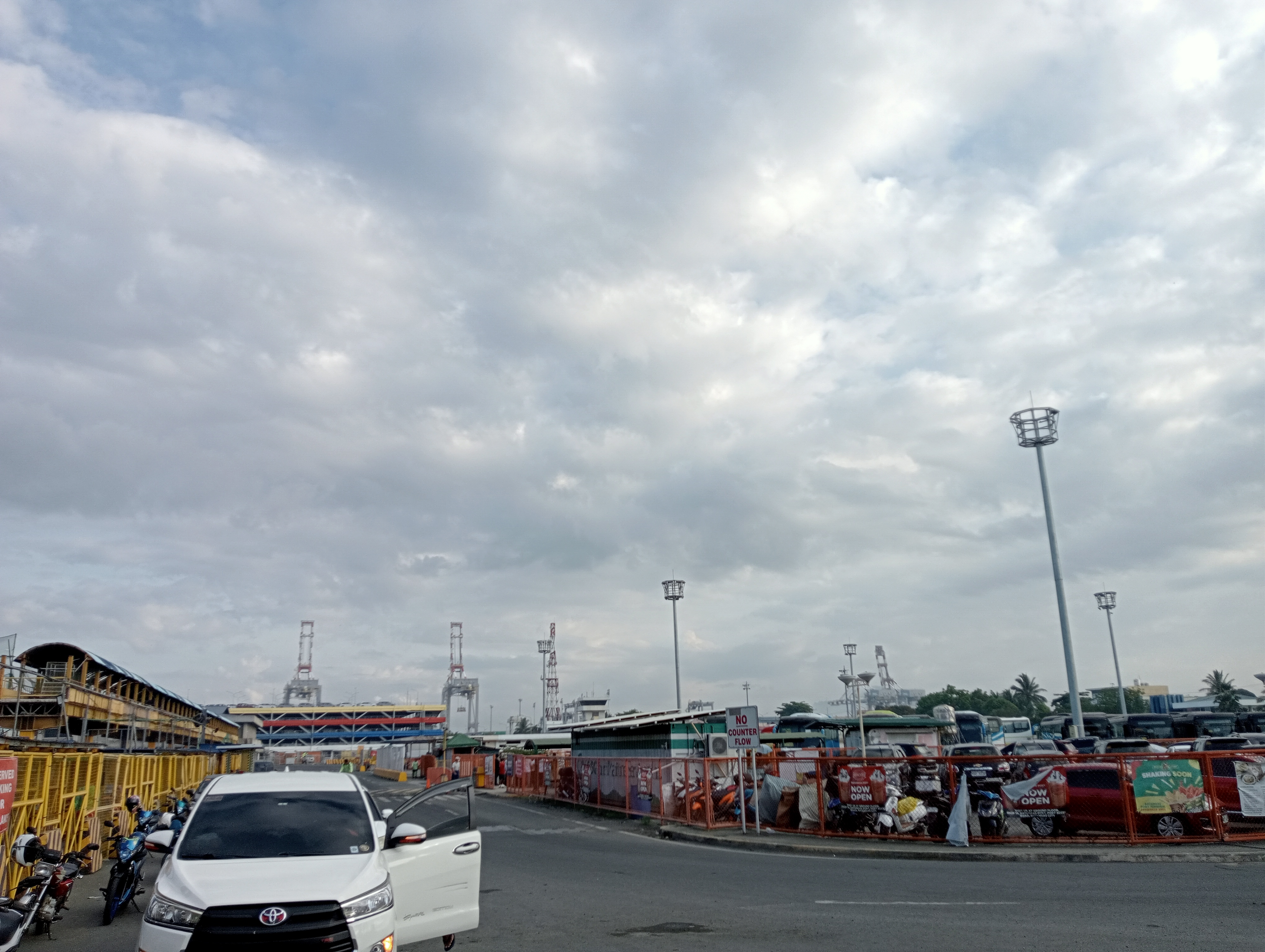
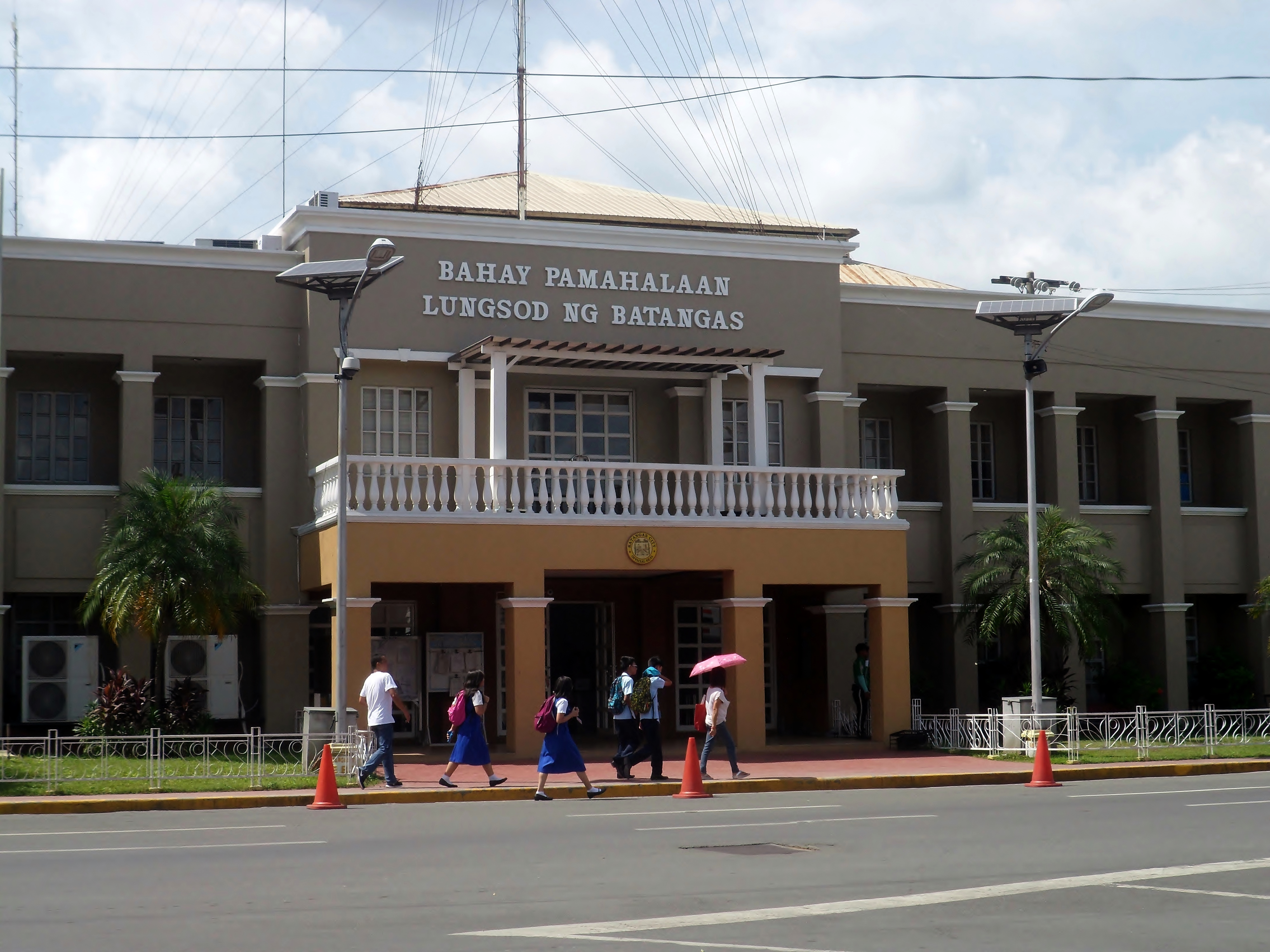
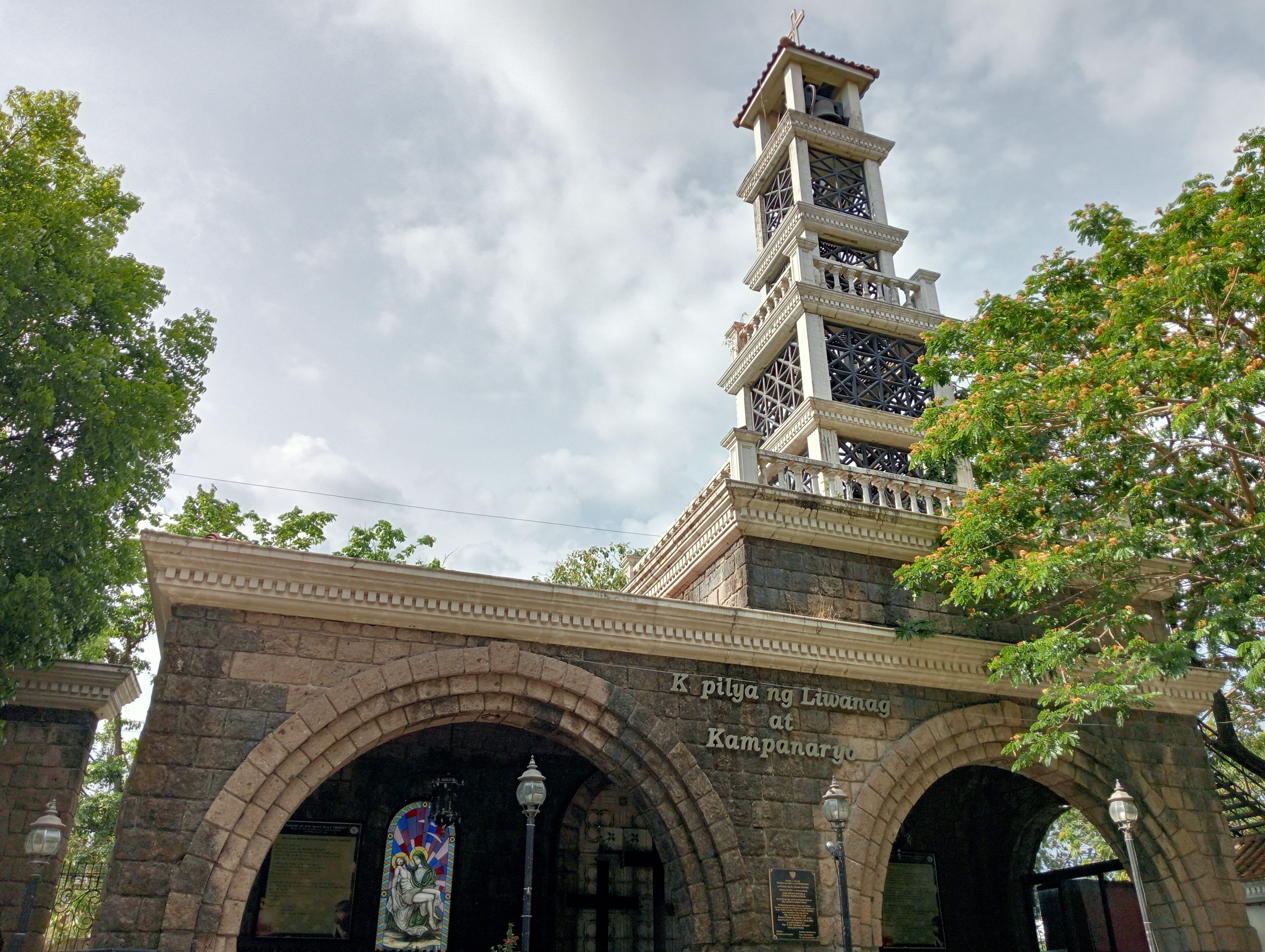
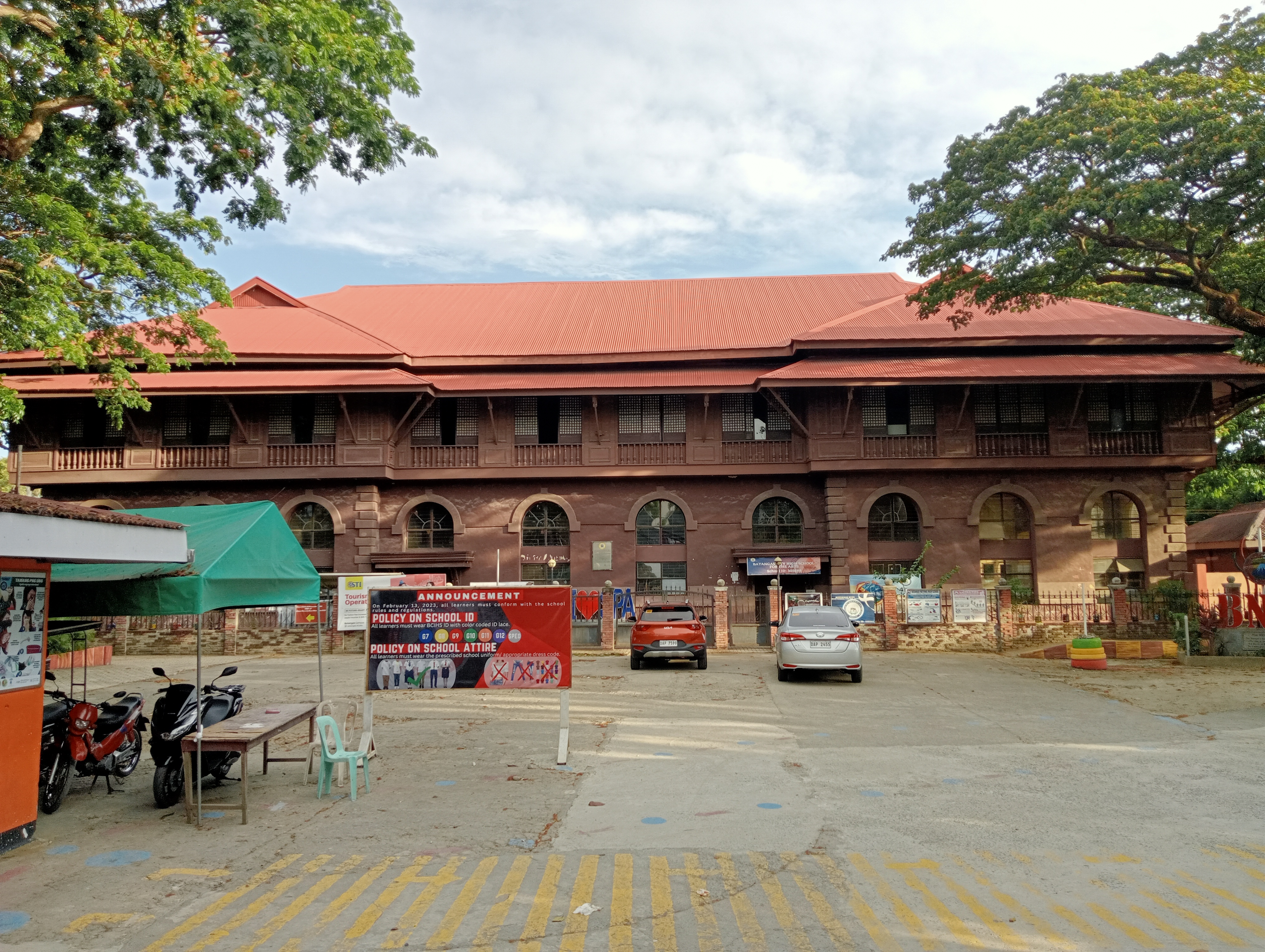
- From top to bottom: Batangas Capitol, Montemaria, Minor Basilica of the Immaculate Conception, Port of Batangas, City Hall, Parish of the Most Holy Trinity, Batangas City High School for the Arts

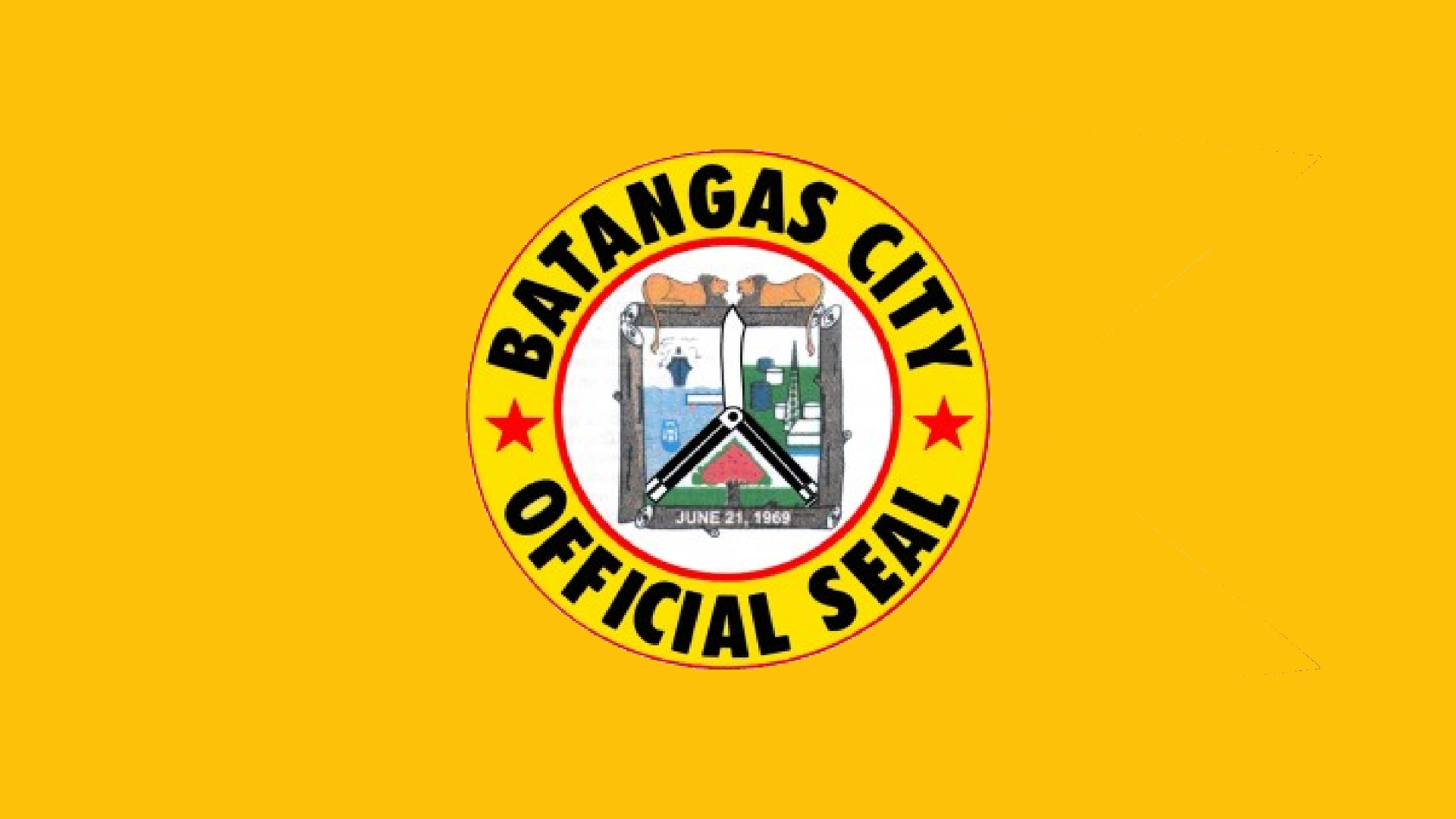
- Flag Seal
- Nicknames: Industrial Port of Calabarzon; Eco Tourist City of the Past, Present and Future; Green City Batangas
- Motto: All here So near Eto Batangueño Disiplinado
- Anthem: Batangas, Lungsod Kong Mahal (Batangas, My Beloved City)
- Map of Batangas with Batangas City highlighted
- Interactive map of Batangas City
- Coordinates: 13°45′N 121°03′E
- Country: Philippines
- Region: Calabarzon
- Province: Batangas
- District: 5th district
- Founded: 1581 (as a pueblo named "Batangan")
- Cityhood: July 23, 1969
- Barangays: 105 (see Barangays)

Government
  - Type: Sangguniang Panlungsod
  - Mayor: Mario Vittorio A. Mariño
  - Vice Mayor: Alyssa Renee A. Cruz
  - Representative: Beverley Rose A. Dimacuha
  - City Council: Members: Maria Claudette U. Ambida; Aileen Grace A. Montalbo; Arthur G. Blanco; Andrea Louise F. Macaraig; Gerardo A. Dela Roca; Armando C. Lazarte; Lorenzo A. Gamboa, Jr.; Ailin Grace O. Dimacuha; Zester Carlo M. Hernandez; Jose Jonash Luis F. Tolentino; Isidra M. Atienza; Michael C. Villena
  - Electorate: 228,263 voters (2025)

Area
  - Total: 282.96 km^{2} (109.25 sq mi)
- Elevation: 128 m (420 ft)
- Highest elevation: 965 m (3,166 ft)
- Lowest elevation: 0 m (0 ft)

Population (2024 census)
  - Total: 358,267
  - Density: 1,266.1/km^{2} (3,279.3/sq mi)
  - Households: 87,196
- Demonyms: Batangueño (male); Batangueña (female); Batanguenean

Economy
  - Income class: 1st city income class
  - Poverty incidence: 4.63% (2015)
  - HDI: ▲0.800 (Very High)
  - Revenue: ₱ 4,787 million (2024)
  - Assets: ₱ 12,995 million (2024)
  - Expenditure: ₱ 2,704 million (2024)
  - Liabilities: ₱ 2,430 million (2024)

Service provider
  - Electricity: Manila Electric Company (Meralco)
- Time zone: UTC+8 (PST)
- ZIP code: 4200
- PSGC: 041005000
- IDD : area code: +63 (0)43
- Native languages: Tagalog
- Numbered highways: E2 (STAR Tollway); N4 (Jose P. Laurel Highway); N434; N436; N437; N438 (Antonio Carpio Road); N439
- Feast date: January 16
- Website: www.batangascity.gov.ph

Batangas City, officially the City of Batangas (Tagalog: Lungsod ng Batangas), is a component city and capital of the province of Batangas, Philippines. According to the 2024 census, it had a population of 358,267.

Batangas City is classified as one of the fastest urbanizing cities of the Philippines, and is known as the "Industrial Port City of Calabarzon". It is home to the Batangas International Port, one of the busiest passenger and container terminals in the Philippines. It also hosts one of the largest oil refineries in the country, three natural gas power plants, and several other major industries. In addition, the city also serves as the educational, industrial and the transportation center of the province.

Batangas City is one of the proposed metropolitan areas in the Philippines. Metro Batangas is proposed to include the component city of Batangas, as well as the towns of Alitagtag, Bauan, Ibaan, Lobo, Mabini, Rosario, San Juan, San Luis, San Pascual, Santa Teresita, Taal, Taysan and Tingloy.

== History ==
=== Kumintang ===
Kumintang was a large precolonial polity (bayan) around the Calumpang River in modern-day Batangas. According to local tradition, it was ruled by a legendary figure named Gat Pulintan, who refused to be Christianized and settled to the hills to take refuge and continue resistance against Spanish occupation. It became a Spanish town in 1581 and unofficially renamed as Batangan.

=== Foreign rule ===
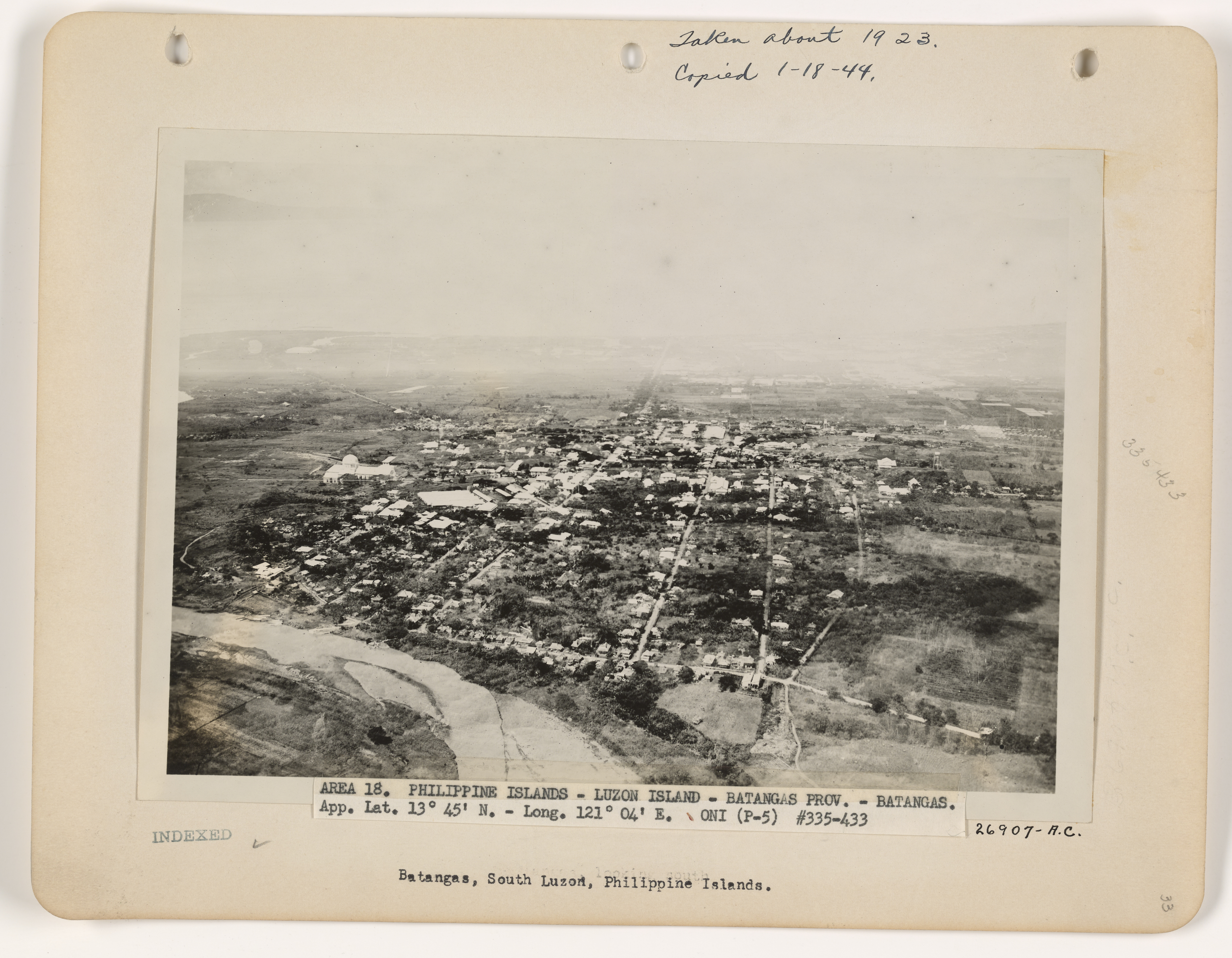
Aerial view of Batangas, circa 1923

The first Spanish missionaries arrived in Batangas City in 1572 due to group migration. Finally, in 1581, Spanish authorities governing the Philippines created a pueblo in the area which included the hill (now Hilltop) where the present Provincial Capitol of Batangas stands after the formal end of Kumintang. The town was named "Batangan" because huge logs, locally called "batang", abounded in the place. The Spanish government appointed Don Agustin Casilao as Batangan's first gobernadorcillo. Said title of "little governor" as head of the pueblo or municipio was replaced in 1894 by "capital municipal". It is not clear who succeeded Casilao nor is it known whether there were subsequent appointments of capital municipal. Don Agustin Casilao is sometimes referred to as Agustino or Augustino in some sources. By 1870, its barangays were Balagtas, Bilogo, Bolbok, Bukal, Catandala, Konde, De La Paz, Kumintang Ibaba, Matuko, Mapagong, Paharang Kanluran, Pairang, Pinamucan, Patulo, Sampaga, San Agapito, San Isidro and Talahib.

At the coming of the Americans in the early 1900s, local civil government of Batangas was set up. It took effect on July 4, 1901, with Jose Villanueva elected as "Municipal President." His term expired in 1903.

Subsequent elections installed the following as municipal presidents: Juan Palacios, 1904–1905; Jose Arguelles, 1906; Marcelo Llana, 1907; Sisenando Ferriols, 1908–1909; Ventura Tolentino, 1910–1914; Julian Rosales, 1915; Juan Gutierrez, 1916–1919; Julian Rosales, 1920–1922; Juan Buenafe, 1923–1930; Perfecto Condez, 1931–1937; Juan Buenafe, 1938–1940. In 1941 the title "Municipal President" was changed to "Municipal Mayor." Pedro Berberabe was elected first municipal mayor.

Batangas City was severely damaged due to the Japanese A6M Zero bombardment and on December 12, 1941, the Batangas Airport which is located in Barangay Alangilan was destroyed. On October 14, 1943, municipal councilor Roman L. Perez was appointed Mayor by the Japanese after the inauguration of the Second Republic of the Philippines. Liberation begun when 158th Regimental Combat Team (or 158th RCT) under the command of the US 6th Army reached Poblacion, Batangas City by March 11 during the Philippines Liberation Campaign of 1944–45. By the end of April the same that year, some elements of the 188th Glider Infantry Regiment of the 11th Airborne Division was left to clear the barangays east and mountains south of the city as the main Allied Force continued their drive towards Tayabas Province. Some local guerrillas and irregulars of the President Quezon's Own Guerrillas (PQOG) entered Batangas City. Throughout the battle, guerrilla fighters played an important role in the advancement of the combined American and Philippine troops, providing key roads and information for the Japanese location of defenses and movements. Hostilities ended as the war came closer to the end.

=== Independence and onwards ===
After the Liberation, President Manuel Roxas issued his reappointment. Mayor Perez ran and won in 1944, the first post-War elections in the country. In November 1949, he was killed by an unknown assassin. Vice Mayor Atilano Magadia succeeded Perez as Mayor, serving until 1951. Mayor Macario Chavez was elected in 1951; his four-year term ended in 1955.

People voted Pedro S. Tolentino overwhelmingly as mayor in 1956. He was reelected three times.

=== Cityhood ===
In 1965, Republic Act No. 4586 was signed by President Diosdado Macapagal, converting Batangas into a city. If successful, it would be renamed as Laurel, after former President Jose P. Laurel, a native of Tanauan. However, the voters rejected the cityhood and renaming of Batangas in a plebiscite.

On June 21, 1969, Republic Act No. 5495 was enacted to convert Batangas into a city, this time using its same name. Later on July 23, Batangas formally became a city by virtue of Proclamation No. 581 that was signed a week earlier. Pedro S. Tolentino became its first city mayor.

=== Contemporary history ===
The succeeding city mayors are Mayor Macario M. Mendoza, 1974–1979; Alfredo M. Borbon, 1979–1980, Conrado C. Berberabe, 1980–1986; Jose M. Atienza, 1986–1987; Mario M. Perez, 1987, Eduardo B. Dimacuha, 1988–1998, Angelito A. Dimacuha, 1998–2001 and again Eduardo B. Dimacuha, 2001–2010, Vilma A. Dimacuha, 2010–2013 and again Eduardo B. Dimacuha, 2013–2016, Beverley Rose A. Dimacuha, 2016–2025, Marvey Mariño, 2025-present.

Meanwhile, on January 19, 2008, President Gloria Macapagal Arroyo opened Phase II project of the Batangas City International Container Port (with turn-over to the Philippine Ports Authority). She also inspected a major road project in Southern Tagalog. She then inspected the P1.5-billion Southern Tagalog Arterial Road (STAR), Stage II-Phase 1 connecting Lipa (19.74 kilometers) and Batangas and the South Luzon Expressway (SLEX) road widening, expansion and the STAR toll way development projects in Batangas.

== Geography ==
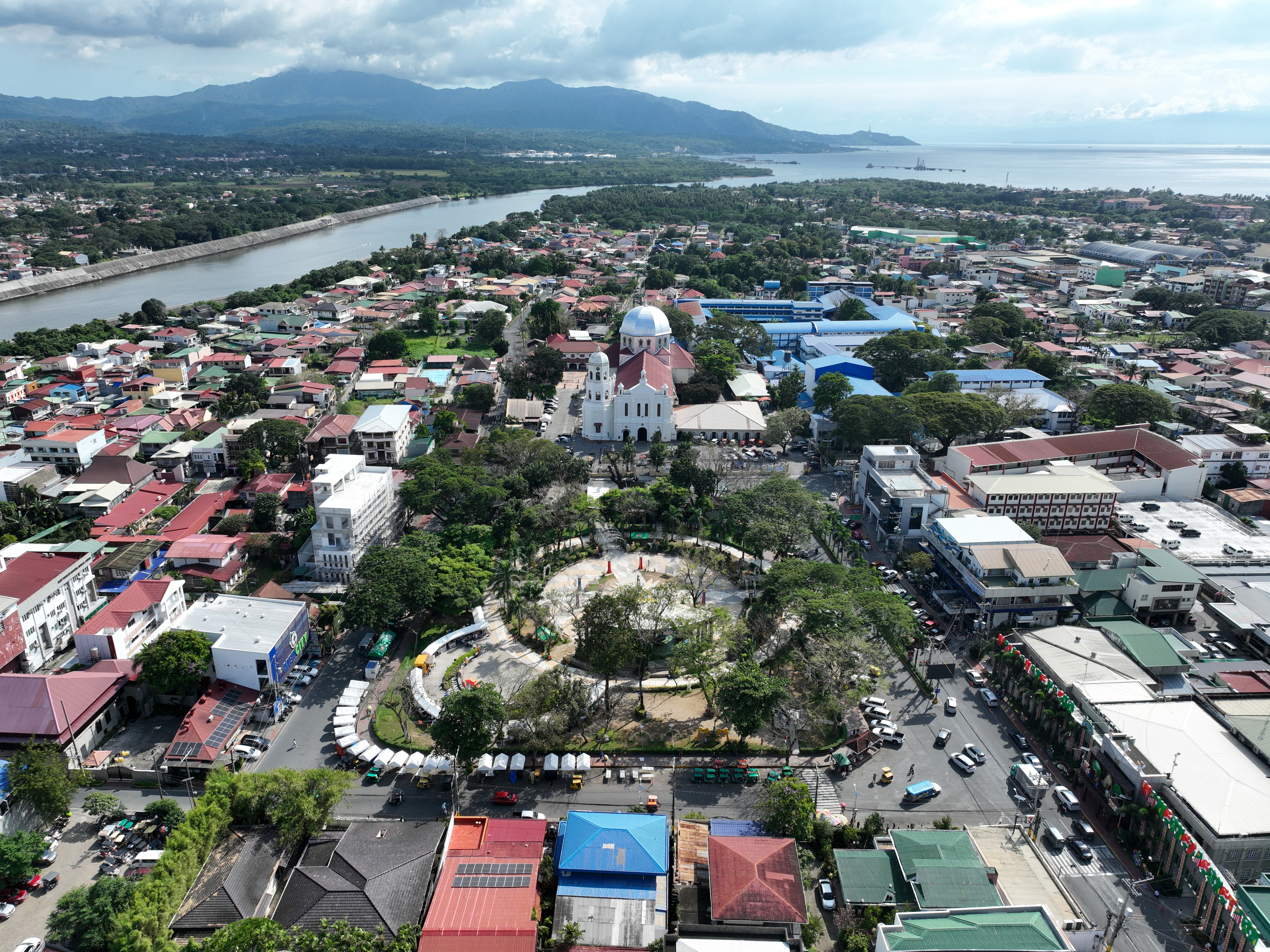
Drone shot of Batangas City poblacion

Batangas City lies in the southernmost part of Batangas, facing Batangas Bay. It is bordered by San Jose to the north, Verde Island Passage to the south, Ibaan, Taysan, and Lobo to the east, and San Pascual to the west. The Calumpang River crosses the city from northeast to southwest. The area west of Calumpang River is generally plains while the eastern area is mostly foothills and mountains.

Batangas City is 105 kilometers (65 mi) from Manila.

=== Barangays ===
Batangas City is politically subdivided into 105 barangays, as indicated in the matrix below. Each barangay consists of puroks and some have sitios.

PSGC	Barangay	Population			±% p.a.	
		2024		2010		
041005001	Alangilan	4.4%	15,669	13,332	▴	1.13%
041005002	Balagtas	2.9%	10,214	9,120	▴	0.79%
041005003	Balete	2.9%	10,520	9,098	▴	1.01%
041005004	Banaba Center	0.8%	2,808	1,984	▴	2.44%
041005005	Banaba Ibaba	1.0%	3,408	2,023	▴	3.69%
041005006	Banaba Kanluran	1.1%	3,949	3,413	▴	1.02%
041005007	Banaba Silangan	0.7%	2,373	1,931	▴	1.44%
041005008	Barangay 1	0.2%	771	706	▴	0.61%
041005009	Barangay 2	0.1%	501	606	▾	−1.31%
041005010	Barangay 3	0.1%	261	367	▾	−2.34%
041005011	Barangay 4	0.5%	1,638	1,499	▴	0.62%
041005012	Barangay 5	0.2%	569	634	▾	−0.75%
041005013	Barangay 6	0.5%	1,810	2,009	▾	−0.72%
041005014	Barangay 7	0.1%	451	715	▾	−3.15%
041005015	Barangay 8	0.1%	478	577	▾	−1.30%
041005016	Barangay 9	0.1%	257	283	▾	−0.67%
041005017	Barangay 10	0.1%	263	353	▾	−2.03%
041005018	Barangay 11	0.1%	348	768	▾	−5.36%
041005019	Barangay 12	0.4%	1,393	1,377	▴	0.08%
041005020	Barangay 13	0.1%	348	509	▾	−2.61%
041005021	Barangay 14	0.1%	233	294	▾	−1.60%
041005022	Barangay 15	0.1%	196	170	▴	0.99%
041005023	Barangay 16	0.0%	101	197	▾	−4.54%
041005024	Barangay 17	0.0%	116	104	▴	0.76%
041005025	Barangay 18	0.1%	328	382	▾	−1.05%
041005026	Barangay 19	0.1%	400	955	▾	−5.87%
041005027	Barangay 20	0.1%	383	344	▴	0.75%
041005028	Barangay 21	0.2%	680	664	▴	0.17%
041005029	Barangay 22	0.0%	94	234	▾	−6.14%
041005030	Barangay 23	0.2%	698	635	▴	0.66%
041005031	Barangay 24	0.4%	1,411	2,877	▾	−4.83%
041005032	Bilogo	0.6%	2,073	1,829	▴	0.87%
041005033	Bolbok	3.6%	12,788	11,806	▴	0.56%
041005034	Bukal	0.9%	3,129	2,460	▴	1.69%
041005035	Calicanto	3.0%	10,769	10,315	▴	0.30%
041005036	Catandala	0.2%	706	644	▴	0.64%
041005037	Concepcion	1.1%	3,933	3,412	▴	0.99%
041005038	Conde Itaas	0.4%	1,427	1,305	▴	0.62%
041005039	Conde Labac	0.7%	2,355	1,763	▴	2.03%
041005040	Cuta	3.9%	14,072	11,460	▴	1.44%
041005041	Dalig	0.9%	3,220	2,248	▴	2.53%
041005042	Dela Paz	0.8%	2,726	2,377	▴	0.96%
041005043	Dela Paz Pulot Aplaya	0.2%	587	583	▴	0.05%
041005044	Dela Paz Pulot Itaas	0.1%	429	419	▴	0.16%
041005045	Domoclay	1.1%	3,908	3,246	▴	1.30%
041005046	Dumantay	1.6%	5,753	3,685	▴	3.15%
041005047	Gulod Itaas	1.7%	6,028	4,950	▴	1.38%
041005048	Gulod Labak	0.7%	2,415	2,433	▾	−0.05%
041005049	Haligue Kanluran	0.3%	1,210	1,112	▴	0.59%
041005050	Haligue Silangan	0.6%	2,016	1,699	▴	1.20%
041005051	Ilihan	1.3%	4,562	3,920	▴	1.06%
041005052	Kumba	0.3%	1,013	914	▴	0.72%
041005053	Kumintang Ibaba	2.6%	9,162	10,134	▾	−0.70%
041005054	Kumintang Ilaya	3.0%	10,900	10,320	▴	0.38%
041005055	Libjo	3.4%	12,256	10,964	▴	0.78%
041005056	Liponpon Isla Verde	0.2%	664	746	▾	−0.81%
041005057	Maapas	0.1%	202	208	▾	−0.20%
041005058	Mabacong	0.6%	2,159	1,873	▴	0.99%
041005059	Mahabang Dahilig	0.4%	1,568	1,430	▴	0.64%
041005060	Mahabang Parang	0.9%	3,394	3,267	▴	0.27%
041005061	Mahacot Kanluran	0.2%	695	600	▴	1.03%
041005062	Mahacot Silangan	0.2%	772	680	▴	0.89%
041005063	Malalim	0.4%	1,352	1,190	▴	0.89%
041005064	Malibayo	0.1%	485	461	▴	0.35%
041005065	Malitam	2.4%	8,563	6,686	▴	1.74%
041005066	Maruclap	0.3%	1,049	957	▴	0.64%
041005067	Pagkilatan	0.4%	1,603	1,321	▴	1.35%
041005068	Paharang Kanluran	0.4%	1,310	1,314	▾	−0.02%
041005069	Paharang Silangan	0.4%	1,395	1,222	▴	0.92%
041005070	Pallocan Kanluran	1.9%	6,854	6,259	▴	0.63%
041005071	Pallocan Silangan	0.9%	3,286	2,026	▴	3.42%
041005072	Pinamucan	1.2%	4,295	3,607	▴	1.22%
041005073	Pinamucan Ibaba	0.5%	1,822	1,410	▴	1.80%
041005074	Pinamucan Silangan	0.3%	1,228	1,125	▴	0.61%
041005075	Sampaga	1.2%	4,458	3,980	▴	0.79%
041005076	San Agapito Isla Verde	0.3%	1,186	1,191	▾	−0.03%
041005077	San Agustin Kanluran Isla Verde	0.2%	669	715	▾	−0.46%
041005078	San Agustin Silangan Isla Verde	0.2%	720	775	▾	−0.51%
041005079	San Andres Isla Verde	0.2%	893	972	▾	−0.59%
041005080	San Antonio Isla Verde	0.3%	943	1,098	▾	−1.05%
041005081	San Isidro	2.1%	7,378	6,887	▴	0.48%
041005082	San Jose Sico	1.6%	5,815	4,627	▴	1.60%
041005083	San Miguel	0.7%	2,351	2,247	▴	0.32%
041005084	San Pedro	0.5%	1,910	1,510	▴	1.65%
041005085	Santa Clara	3.6%	12,843	10,584	▴	1.35%
041005086	Santa Rita Aplaya	0.5%	1,795	2,281	▾	−1.65%
041005087	Santa Rita Karsada	5.7%	20,321	17,330	▴	1.11%
041005088	Santo Domingo	0.5%	1,915	1,789	▴	0.47%
041005089	Santo Niño	0.7%	2,468	2,520	▾	−0.14%
041005090	Simlong	1.2%	4,188	3,800	▴	0.68%
041005091	Sirang Lupa	0.5%	1,779	1,369	▴	1.84%
041005092	Sorosoro Ibaba	0.8%	3,042	2,713	▴	0.80%
041005093	Sorosoro Ilaya	2.1%	7,650	1,801	▴	10.58%
041005094	Sorosoro Karsada	1.0%	3,581	1,764	▴	5.05%
041005095	Tabangao Ambulong	1.7%	6,038	4,862	▴	1.52%
041005096	Tabangao Aplaya	0.7%	2,508	3,216	▾	−1.71%
041005097	Tabangao Dao	0.8%	2,978	2,625	▴	0.88%
041005098	Talahib Pandayan	0.6%	2,299	2,301	▾	−0.01%
041005099	Talahib Payapa	0.1%	519	575	▾	−0.71%
041005100	Talumpok Kanluran	0.8%	2,900	2,867	▴	0.08%
041005101	Talumpok Silangan	0.6%	2,301	1,845	▴	1.55%
041005102	Tinga Itaas	0.9%	3,060	2,801	▴	0.62%
041005103	Tinga Labak	2.0%	7,164	5,883	▴	1.38%
041005104	Tulo	1.2%	4,359	3,684	▴	1.18%
041005105	Wawa	2.4%	8,605	6,455	▴	2.02%
	Total		358,267	305,607	▴	1.11%

Pagkilatan was formerly a sitio of Matoco. Malalim was formerly the "southern portion of the barrio of Sirang Lupa, the northern portion of the barrio Mahabang Dahilig, and the eastern portion of San Isidro" "together with the sitio of Malalim"; this territory became a barrio (barangay) in 1954. In the same year, sitio Malitam, formerly part of barrio Libjo, was elevated as a barrio. San Antonio was constituted from the sitios of Ilaya, Labac, Matalisay, Pajo and Cacawan, from the barrio of San Agapito. In 1957, the barrio of Talumpok was divided into two. Sitios Romano, Poyesan, Bondeo and Latag were constituted into Talumpok Silangan, while sitios Ginto, Duhatan, Kulingkang, Piit and Cuaba were constituted into Talumpok Kanluran.

Balagtas was formerly known as Patay, Kumintang Ilaya as Sambat Ilaya, and Kumintang Ibaba as Sambat Ibaba.

=== Climate ===
Climate data for Batangas City (Ambulong Weather Station, normals 1991–2020, extremes 1919-2020)
Month	Jan	Feb	Mar	Apr	May	Jun	Jul	Aug	Sep	Oct	Nov	Dec	Year
Record high °C (°F)	34.9 (94.8)	37.2 (99.0)	38.0 (100.4)	38.3 (100.9)	38.8 (101.8)	38.0 (100.4)	36.8 (98.2)	36.7 (98.1)	35.8 (96.4)	37.3 (99.1)	36.5 (97.7)	35.3 (95.5)	38.8 (101.8)
Mean daily maximum °C (°F)	30.1 (86.2)	31.1 (88.0)	32.5 (90.5)	34.3 (93.7)	33.9 (93.0)	32.8 (91.0)	31.5 (88.7)	31.1 (88.0)	31.4 (88.5)	31.6 (88.9)	31.2 (88.2)	30.1 (86.2)	31.8 (89.2)
Daily mean °C (°F)	26.3 (79.3)	26.7 (80.1)	27.7 (81.9)	29.1 (84.4)	29.3 (84.7)	28.7 (83.7)	27.8 (82.0)	27.7 (81.9)	27.8 (82.0)	27.7 (81.9)	27.5 (81.5)	26.7 (80.1)	27.7 (81.9)
Mean daily minimum °C (°F)	22.4 (72.3)	22.2 (72.0)	23.0 (73.4)	23.9 (75.0)	24.6 (76.3)	24.6 (76.3)	24.2 (75.6)	24.3 (75.7)	24.2 (75.6)	23.9 (75.0)	23.8 (74.8)	23.3 (73.9)	23.7 (74.7)
Record low °C (°F)	16.0 (60.8)	16.1 (61.0)	16.2 (61.2)	17.5 (63.5)	20.0 (68.0)	20.6 (69.1)	19.2 (66.6)	19.0 (66.2)	19.5 (67.1)	18.9 (66.0)	18.3 (64.9)	16.8 (62.2)	16.0 (60.8)
Average precipitation mm (inches)	25.8 (1.02)	22.1 (0.87)	21.0 (0.83)	25.0 (0.98)	129.4 (5.09)	213.2 (8.39)	338.3 (13.32)	305.5 (12.03)	271.0 (10.67)	192.6 (7.58)	139.6 (5.50)	132.6 (5.22)	1,816.1 (71.5)
Average rainy days	5	3	3	3	9	13	18	17	16	12	11	9	119
Average relative humidity (%)	81	79	78	75	79	82	85	86	86	85	83	84	82
Source: PAGASA

Batangas City has a tropical savanna climate (Köppen climate classification system type Aw/As), straddling on a bordering tropical monsoon climate (Köppen climate classification system type Am) to the east. The city is dry from January to April, with temperatures reaching up to 33.3 °C (91.9 °F) in April, and rainy for the rest of the year, with July being the rainiest month, with up to 288 millimeters (11.3 in) of rainfall. Humidity levels are high for most of the year.

== Demographics ==
Population census of Batangas City

Year	Pop.	±% p.a.
1903	33,131	—
1918	41,089	+1.45%
1939	49,164	+0.86%
1948	59,582	+2.16%
1960	82,627	+2.76%
1970	108,868	+2.79%

Year	Pop.	±% p.a.
1975	125,363	+2.87%
1980	143,570	+2.75%
1990	184,970	+2.57%
1995	211,879	+2.58%
2000	247,588	+3.40%
2007	295,231	+2.46%

Year	Pop.	±% p.a.
2010	305,607	+1.26%
2015	329,874	+1.47%
2020	351,437	+1.34%
2024	358,267	+0.46%

Source: Philippine Statistics Authority

In the 2024 census, the population of Batangas City was 358,267 people, with a density of 1,300 inhabitants per square kilometer or 3,400 inhabitants per square mile.

== Economy ==
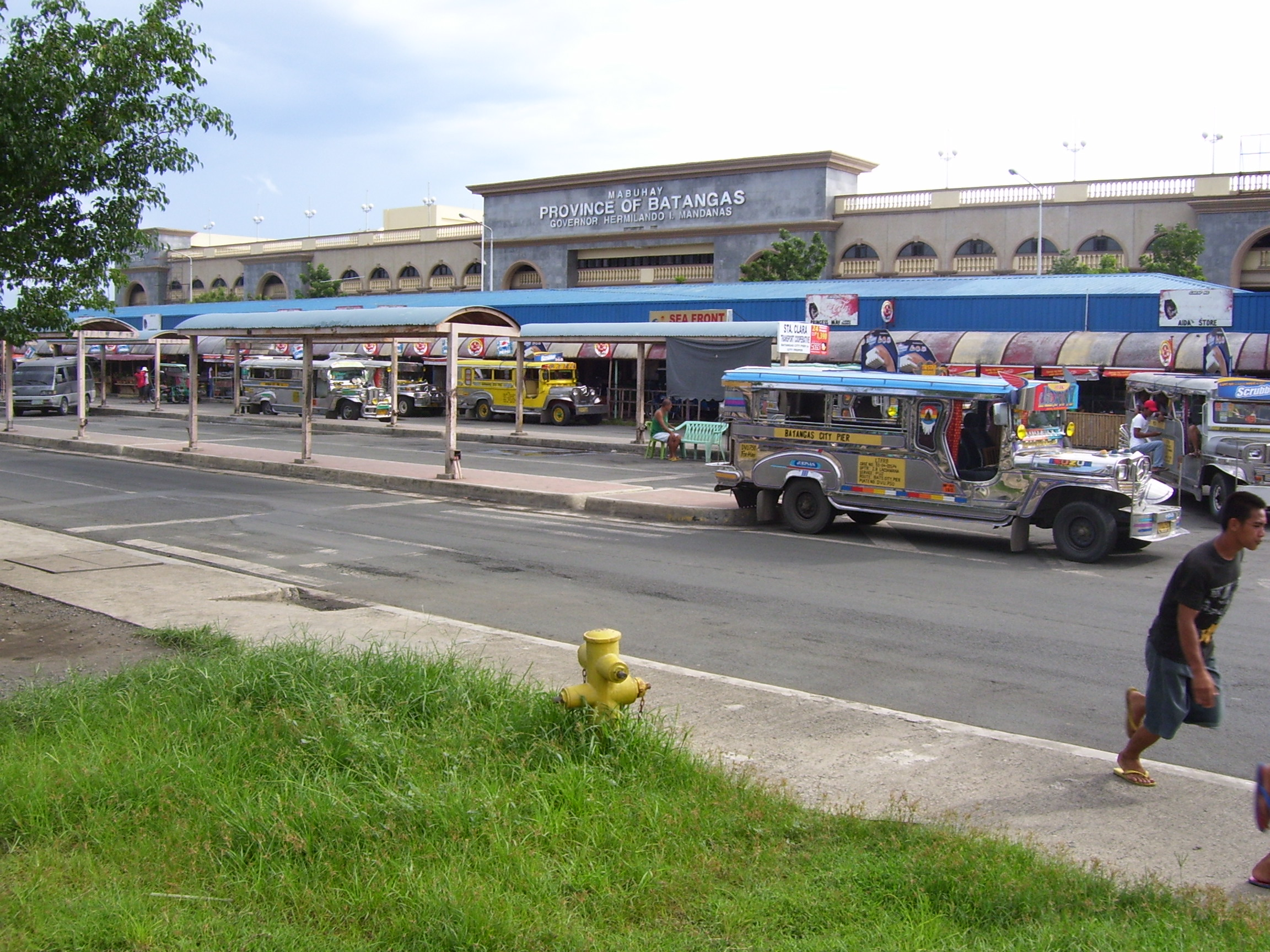
Unused "pasalubong center/complex" at the Port of Batangas

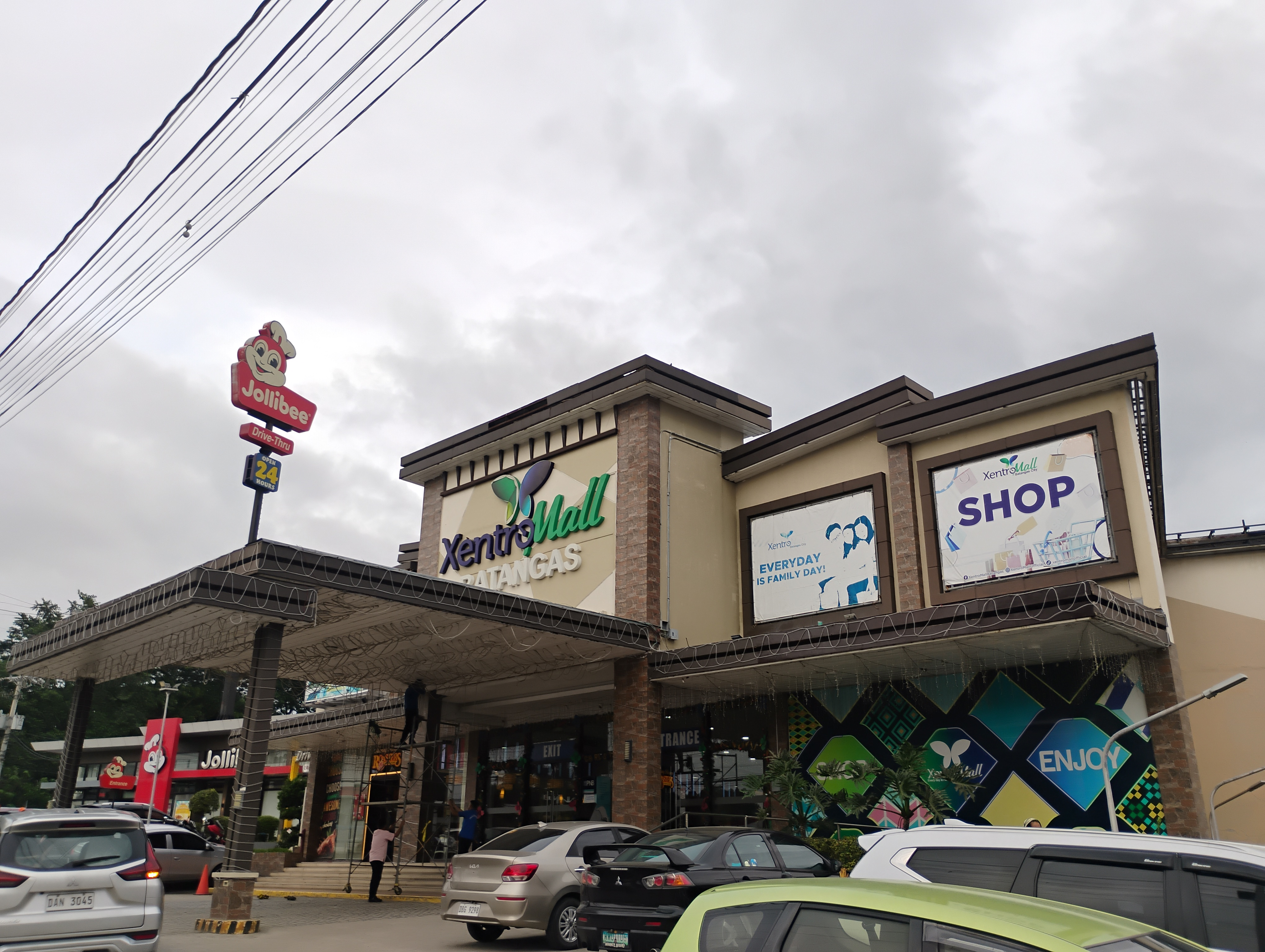
Xentro Mall Batangas City

Poverty incidence of Batangas City (%)

Source: Philippine Statistics Authority

P. Burgos St. A major commercial center of Batangas City

With the expansion of Batangas Port, the operation of different heavy industries and the construction of Phase II of the STAR Tollway project and diversion roads, Batangas City has seen a gradual shift from an agricultural economy to a commercial economy and eventually to an industrial economy.

The northwest of the city hosts different commercial establishments while the lowland areas surrounding Batangas Bay hosts the heavy industries of the city. However, despite its gradual shift in becoming a major commercial/industrial hub for Calabarzon, it still shares rural landscapes that is still preserved in the north part of the city. The Poblacion area is the major retail and commercial center of the city. It is filled with banks, restaurants, and local businesses.

Being a major port city, Batangas has seen an increase in migrants from nearby provinces, islands, and even nation states such as China, India, Indonesia and Malaysia.

=== Agriculture ===
Agriculture remains an important source of food and income for residents of rural barangays. Residents in rural areas practice subsidence farming, with some of their harvest sold to the lowland public wet markets. Major crops include coconut, corn, vegetables, and mangoes.

=== Industries ===
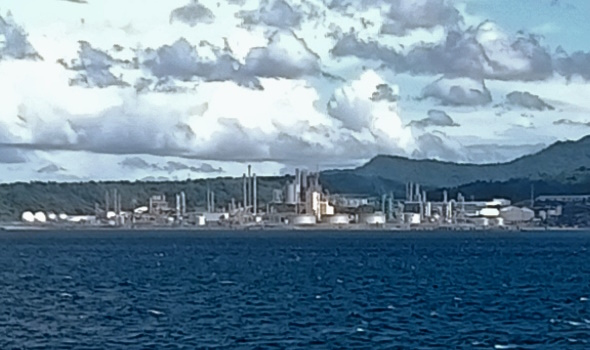
JG Summit Petrochemical Complex

Industries in Batangas City are concentrated around Batangas Port, Tabangao and Pinamucan areas, and Sorosoro Karsada. Shell, through its Philippine subsidiary, Shell Pilipinas Corporation, owns large refineries in Tabangao, and provides most of the fuel supply sold in Shell gas stations in southern Luzon and Metro Manila. JG Summit Holdings operates a petrochemical facility in Pinamucan Ibaba, with expansions to accommodate a coal power plant, which attracted controversy from locals and environmentalists. Other companies also set up refineries for distribution to the province and nearby areas.

=== Commerce ===
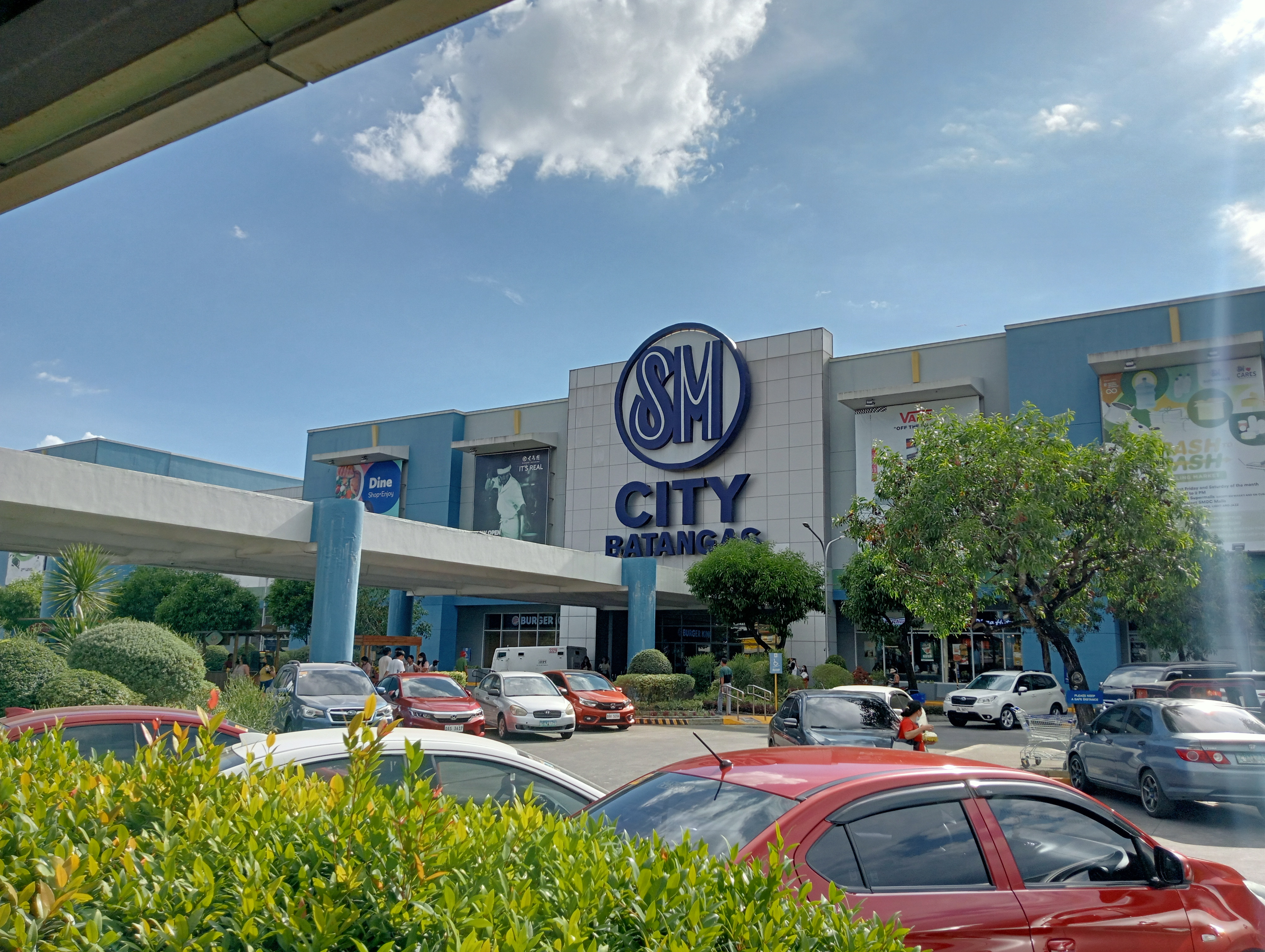
SM City Batangas

Batangas City hosts shopping malls such as SM City Batangas, operated by SM Supermalls, and Bay City Mall and Nuciti Central, owned by local retail companies. There is a sizeable number of supermarkets in the urbanized areas, some being part of malls while others being stand-alone neighborhood markets, fiercely competing with local public markets.

The Poblacion area hosts numerous shops, restaurants, banks, pawnshops, and other establishments. Two major public markets in the city proper serves produce from the rural barangays of the city as well as nearby municipalities.

The Diversion Road, constructed to divert traffic going to Batangas Port and Bauan from the city proper, is seeing a rise in retail stores in addition to industrial space. Numerous car dealerships are built along the length of the road in barangays Alangilan and Balagtas. Fast food restaurants, like McDonald's and Shakey's Pizza are also rising near the Batangas City Grand Terminal.

=== Real estate ===
In response to population and economic growth, local or national real estate companies are developing subdivisions to accommodate the increasing populations. Large-scale developments are present, mostly of local developers, but major developers like Ayala Land and Vista Land (through Camella) also have presence in the city.

PonteFino Corporate Group and PonteFino Estates' The Forum I.T. Business Park is a 4.26-hectare Philippine Economic Zone Authority-certified commercial township in Batangas City. Its PonteFino Hotel is located along Governor Antonio Carpio Road, Pastor Village, Gulod Labac.

== Culture ==
=== Cuisine ===
A specialty dish of the city is pancit na pula (also known as pancit tikyano or miki pula), a variation of pansit miki guisado of red miki noodles.

The city is also famous for its nilupak. The art of making the dish is indigenous to the area and has been cited as having a great potential for inclusion in the UNESCO Intangible Cultural Heritage Lists.

=== Festivals ===
Batangas City host three major religious festivals, such as the Feast of the Santo Niño at every third Sunday of January, as well as religious processions during Good Friday and the Feast of the Immaculate Conception. The Sublian Festival, held every July 23, revives the old Batangueño tradition of subli. The Batangas City Founding Day celebrations are done alongside the Sublian Festival on the same day.

== Infrastructure ==
=== Transportation ===
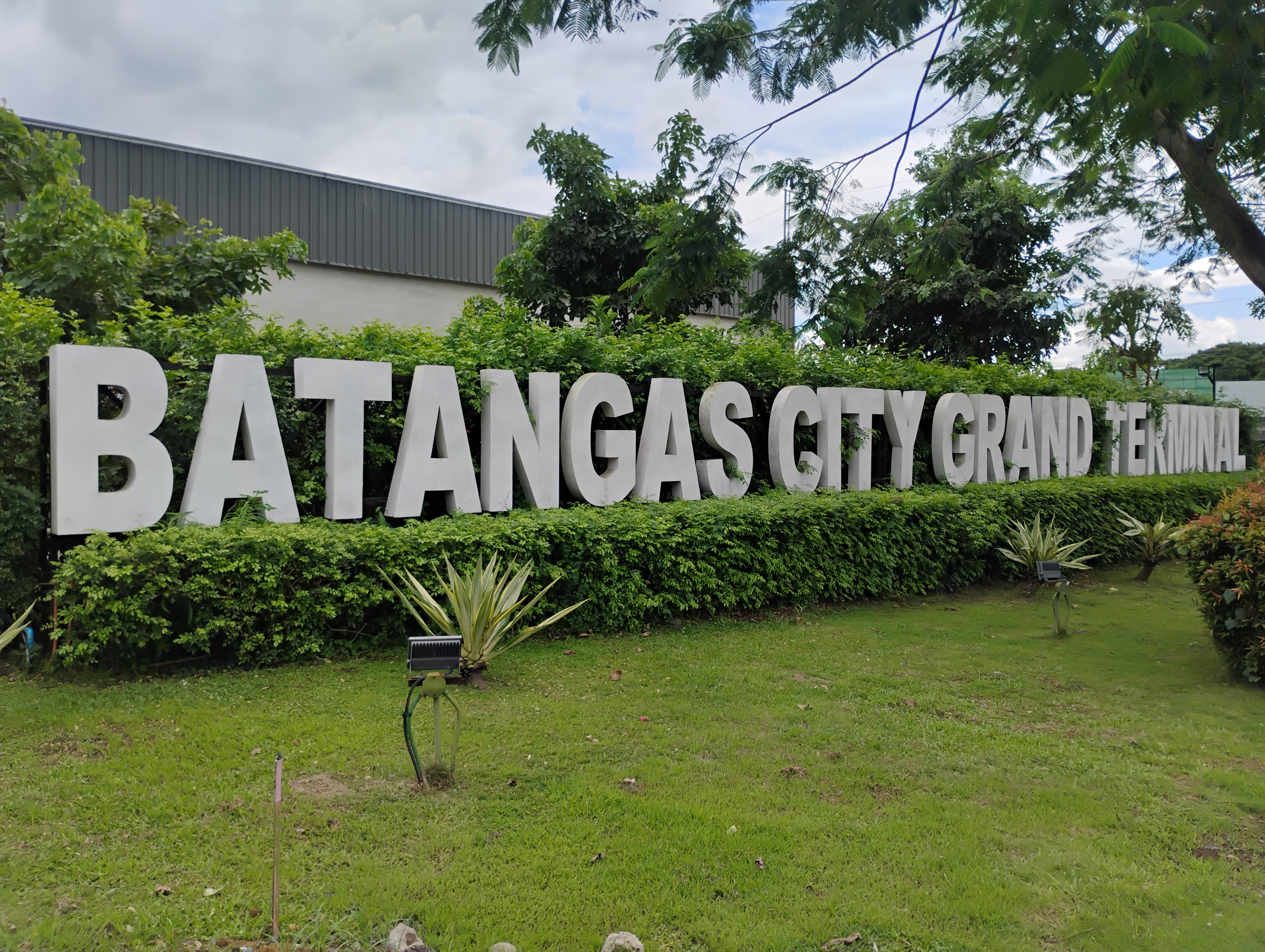
Batangas City Grand Terminal

Batangas City's public transportation mainly include jeepneys and tricycles. Also, the city has transportation between barangays and other cities and municipalities. The city's central transportation hub is the Batangas City Grand Terminal, location along the Diversion Road in Alangilan.

==== Roads ====
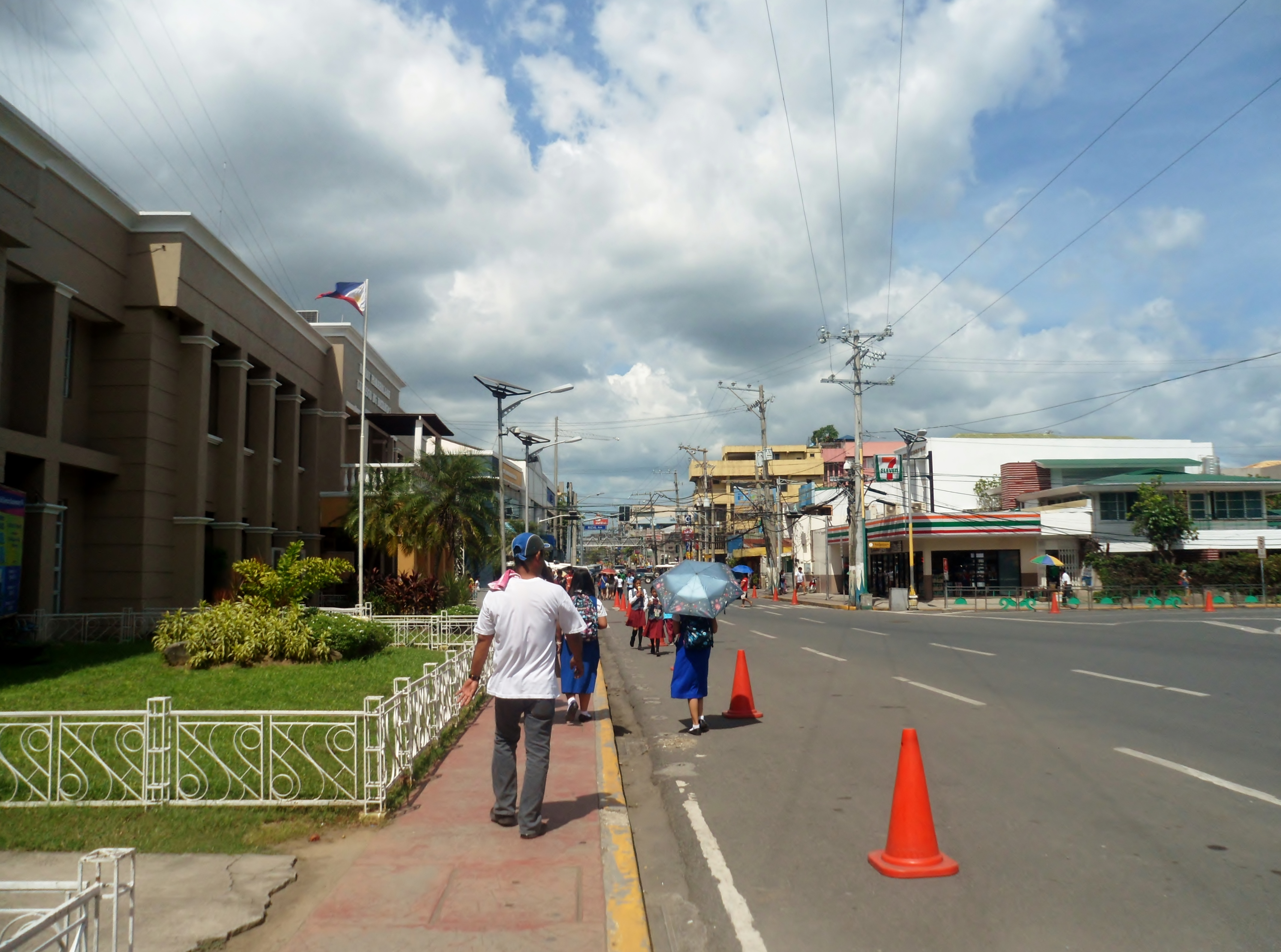
P. Burgos Street, looking north

Batangas City serves as a terminus for major highways like the Southern Tagalog Arterial Road (STAR Tollway), Jose P. Laurel Highway (N4) and Batangas-Quezon Road (N435), and Bauan-Batangas Road (N436). In the early 2000s, a diversion road was built to provide travellers a bypass to the existing highway through the urban centers. Despite the construction of the diversion, traffic bottlenecks remained inside the city. The city government is constructing a bypass road in the east to provide better access to the fast-growing industrial areas in the south of the city.

The poblacion of the city features a road network based on a rough grid, typical of Spanish-era cities and towns. Streets in the area are mostly named from historical figures, such as Apolinario Mabini, Diego Silang, Juan B. Alegre, the Gomburza (Mariano Gomez, José Burgos, and Jacinto Zamora) and the ilustrados (José Rizal, Marcelo del Pilar, and Graciano López Jaena).

==== Railways ====
Batangas City, then a town, was served by a branch line of the Philippine National Railways until its closure.

As part of President Rodrigo Duterte's infrastructure development program, DuterteNomics or "Build-Build-Build", a railway line from Calamba will be constructed to connect with the city. The railway line, the Calamba-Batangas Line, a part of the longer Manila-Matnog Railway, is approved by the National Economic Development Authority on September 12, 2017, and funding will be provided by the Chinese government. Start of construction of the railway, as part of the Manila-Matnog Railway, is not yet set.

=== Utilities ===
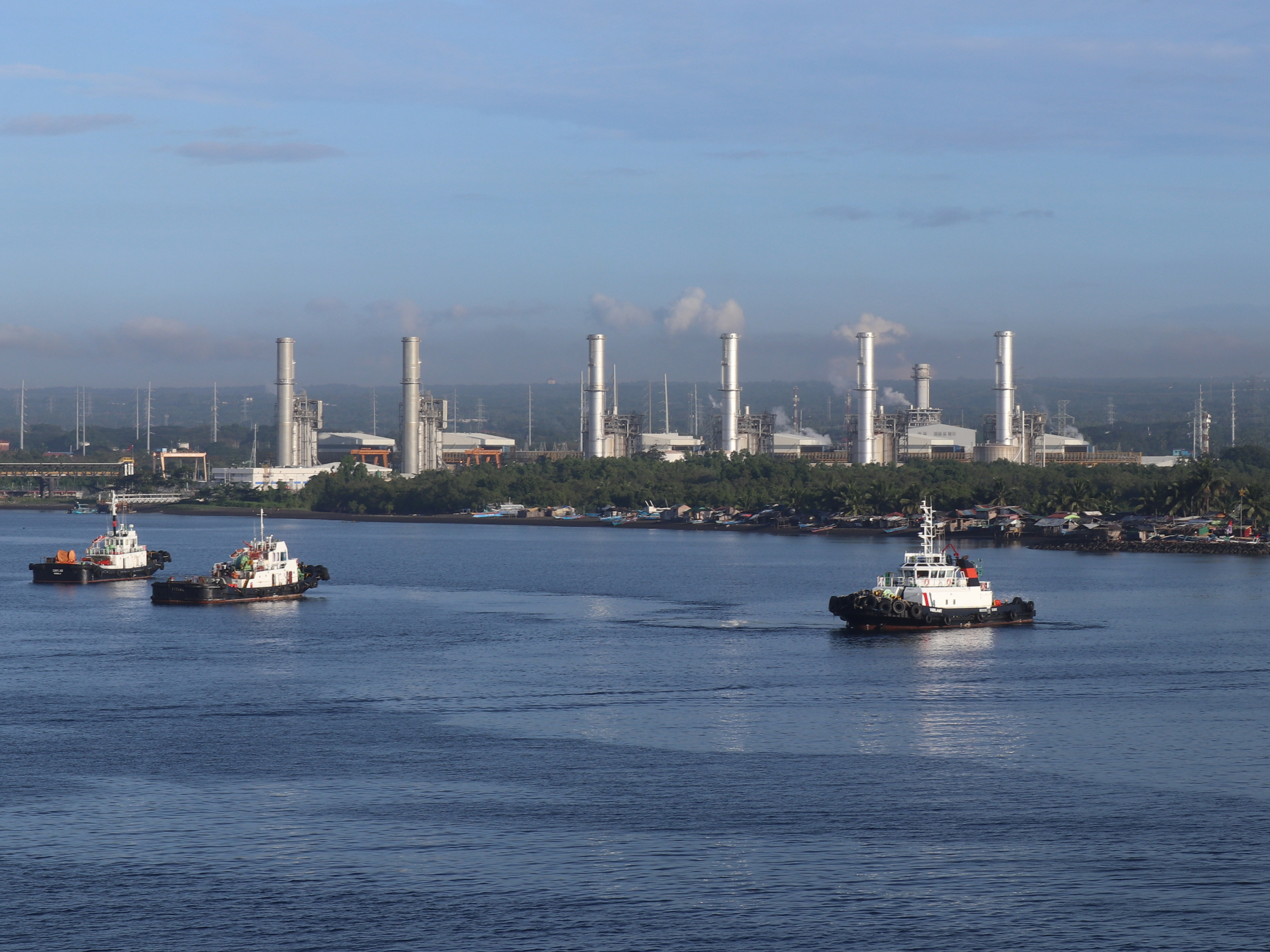
San Lorenzo Combined Cycle Power Plant

Electricity services in Batangas City is provided by Meralco for most of its barangays. Some barangays in the eastern rural area near the boundary with Taysan are served by the Batangas II Electric Cooperative (BATELEC-II). Power in off-grid Verde Island is provided by diesel generators and solar panels.

The water services in the urbanized areas are provided by the Batangas City Water District (BCWD). Rural areas are localized and provided by the Rural Waterworks and Sewage Authority.

The city is also locations of two major power plants that supply power to the Luzon grid:

- Ilijan Power Plant – a natural gas power plant owned and operated by the Korea Electric Power Company (KEPCO)
- San Lorenzo – Santa Rita Power Plant – a combined cycle natural gas power plant owned and operated by Firstgen

== Education ==
Among the higher education institutions in the city is the Batangas State University, Lyceum of the Philippines University–Batangas, University of Batangas, St. Bridget College and STI College.

The Department of Education also maintains a division in Batangas City. For of the academic year of 2013–2014, there are 82 public elementary schools and 18 public high schools. For the academic year of 2016–2017, 50 private schools offering various levels of education from pre-school to college level have legal permit to operate in the city.

In line of the Department of Education's specialized program, Batangas City High School for the Arts (BCHSA) is a junior high school that separated from its mother school Batangas National High School (now Batangas City Integrated High School), before being independent school this school is also part of BNHS/BCHSA as Special Program in the Arts, this school was founded on 2019 and currently it has over 140 students with various specialization (Dance Arts, Theatre Arts, Music-Voice, Music-Instruments, Media Arts, Visual Arts)

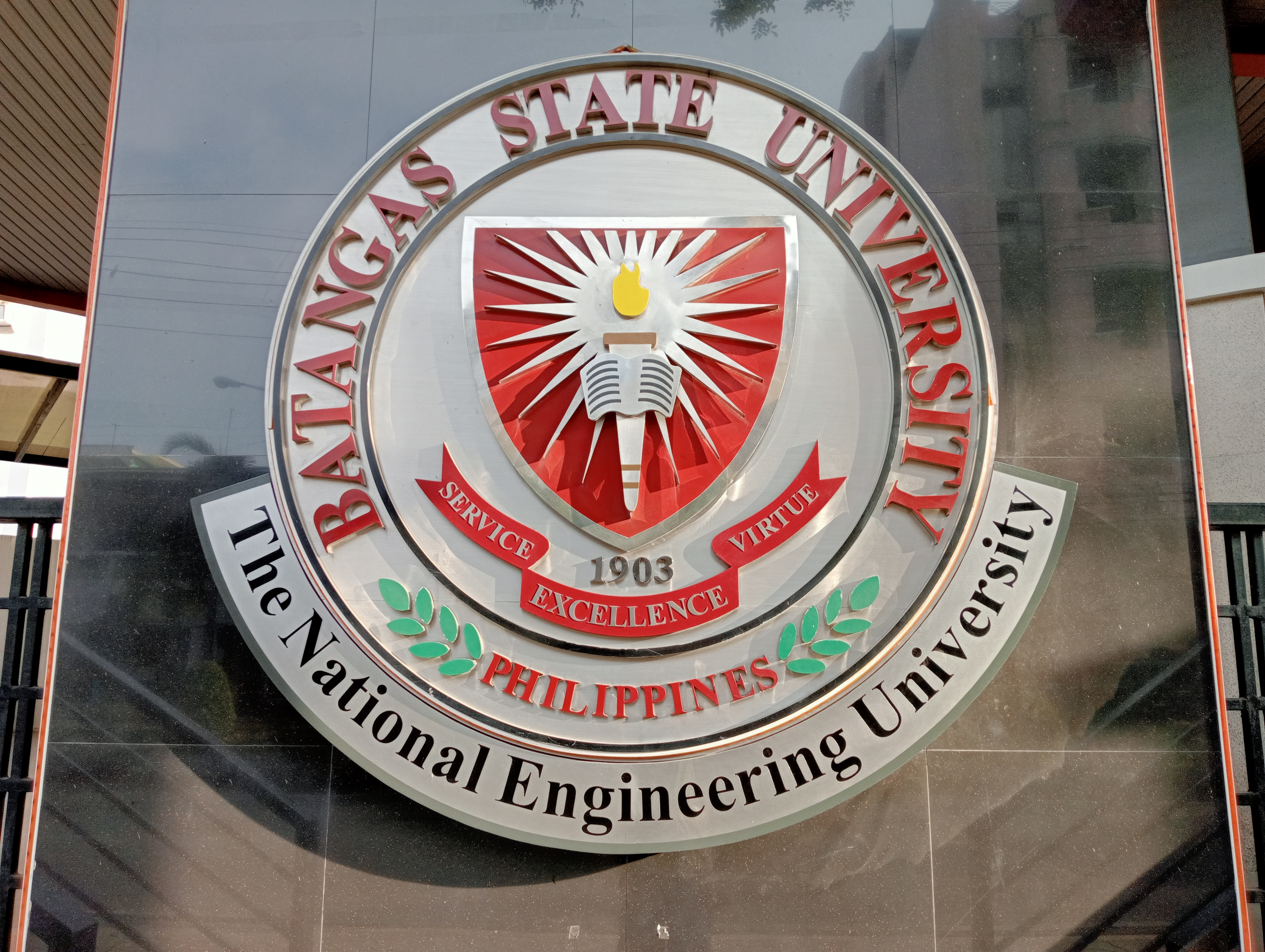
Batangas State University

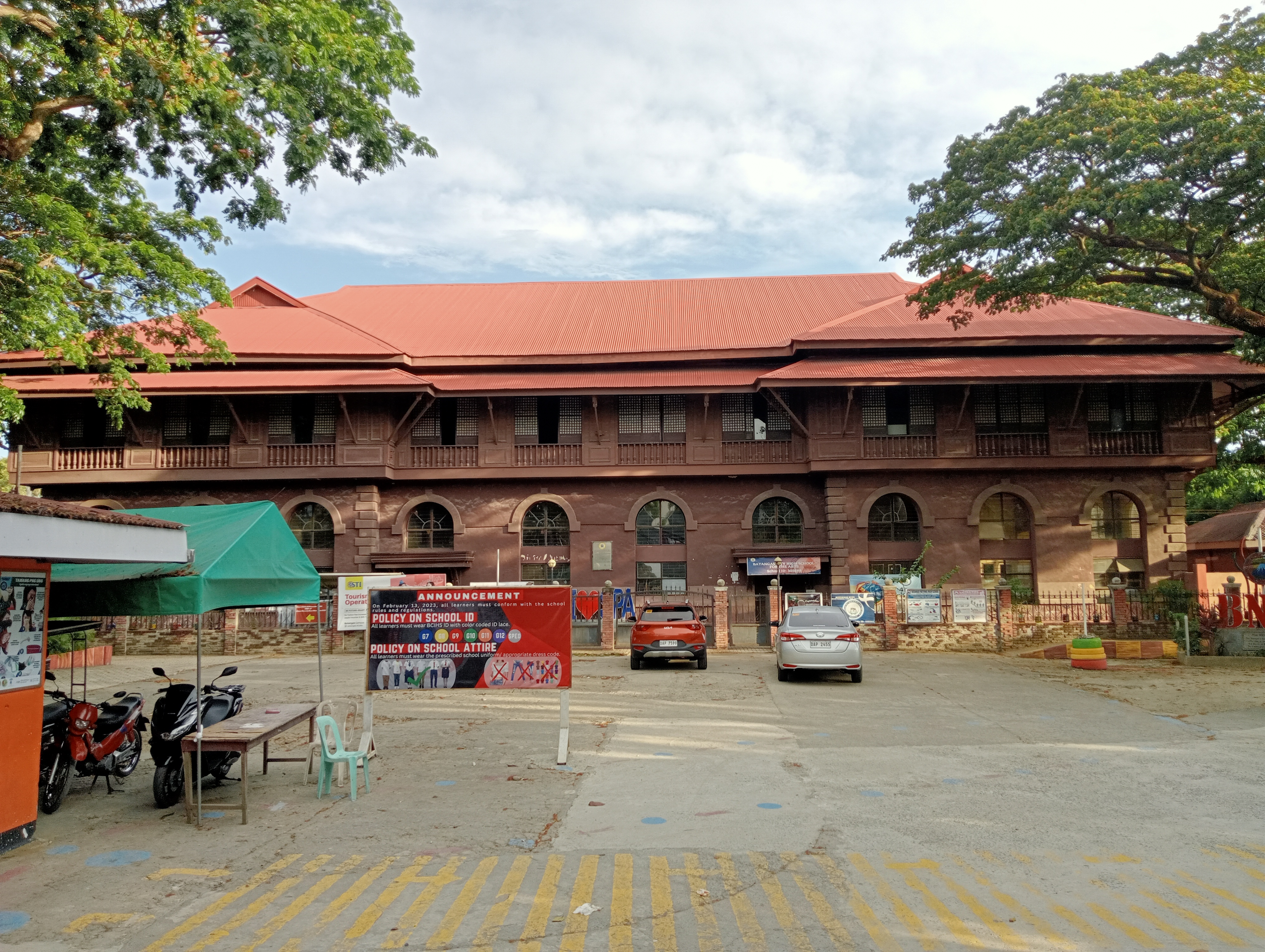
Batangas City High School for the Arts

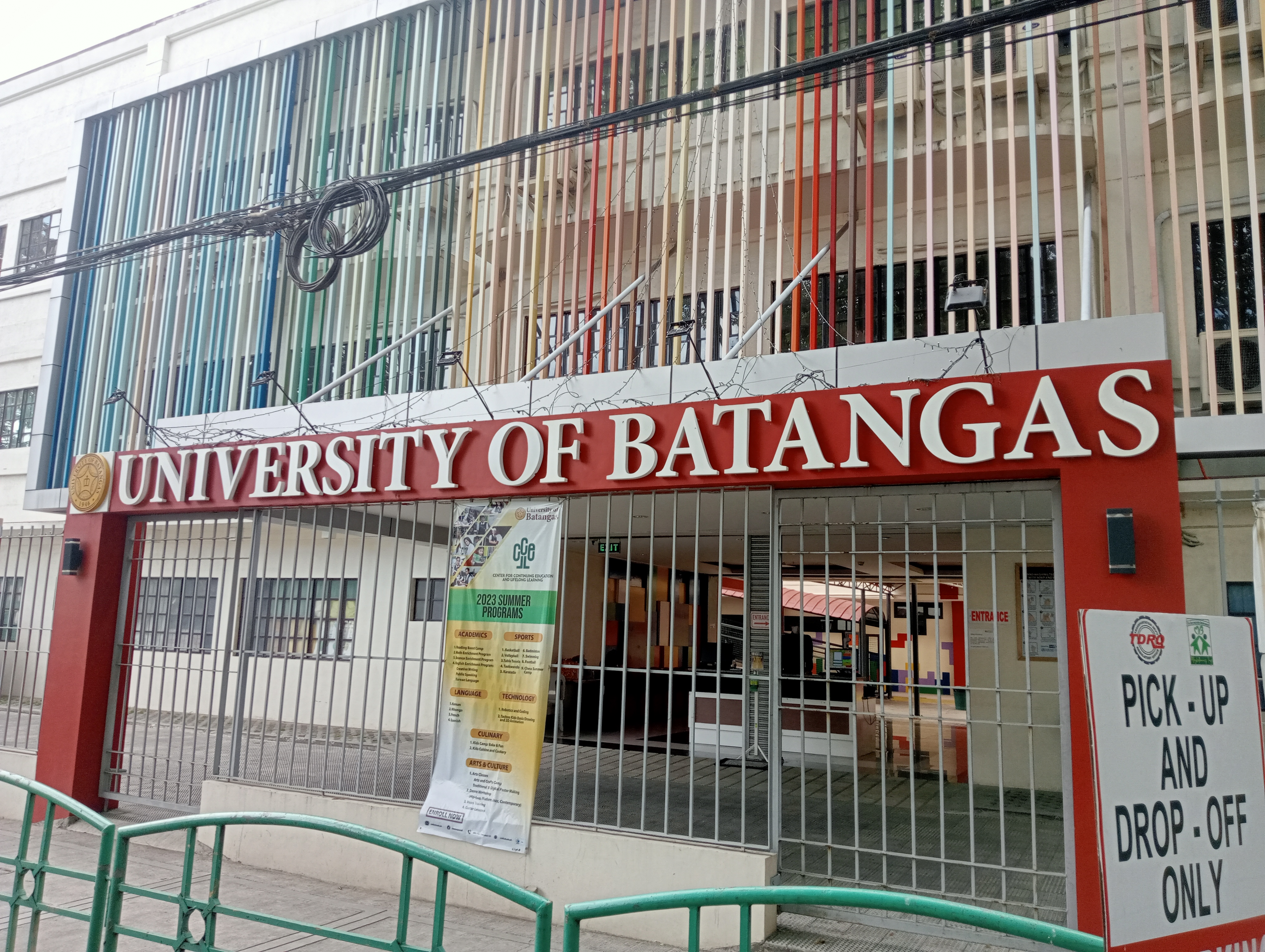
University of Batangas

== Media ==
GMA Network serves Batangas City through local channels. ABS-CBN's regional channel, ABS-CBN Southern Tagalog (DZAD-TV, channel 10) have hosted its studios in Batangas City until they moved to Lipa in 2015. GMA serves Batangas City through channels 12 (D-12-ZB-TV) and GTV via channel 26 (DZDK-TV). Cable television is provided by Batangas MyCATV (formerly Batangas CATV).

Batangas City has local newspapers like the English-language Sun.Star People's Courier and the Tagalog-language Balikas. Newspapers marketed in Metro Manila, such as the major broadsheets Philippine Star, Philippine Daily Inquirer, and Manila Bulletin, and tabloids like Abante, Balita, People's Journal, Pilipino Mirror, and Pilipino Star Ngayon, are also sold in the city through local distributors.

The city is the center of the radio listening market in Batangas, and is served by local radio stations, as well as some radio stations from Lipa and other parts of the Mega Manila area. The Roman Catholic Archdiocese of Lipa, through the Radyo Bayanihan System, hosts two local radio stations: ALFM 95.9 Radyo Totoo (DWAL), a religion, news, talk, and music-oriented station, and 99.1 Spirit FM (DWAM), a religion and music-oriented station. Other radio stations include 91.9 Air1 Radio Southern Tagalog (DWCH), an adult contemporary-oriented station, 99.9 GV FM (DZGV), a contemporary hit radio station, and 104.7 Brigada News FM (DWEY), an FM news radio station. Batangas State University hosts a college radio station, 107.3 BatStateU FM (DWPB-FM). Signals from other stations in Metro Manila are not clearly received because of the local topography.

== Gallery ==
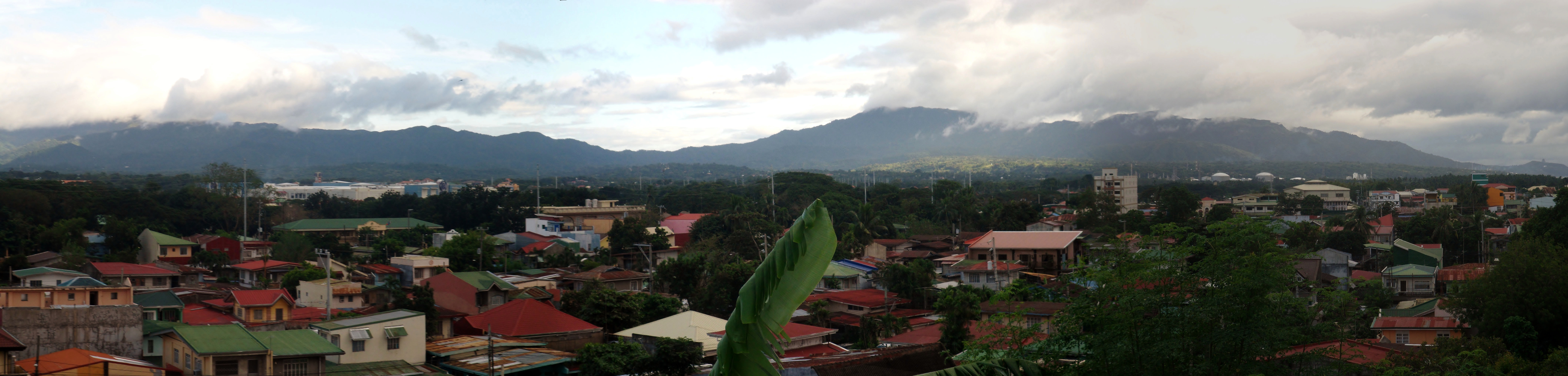
Panorama of Batangas City and Mount Pinamucan
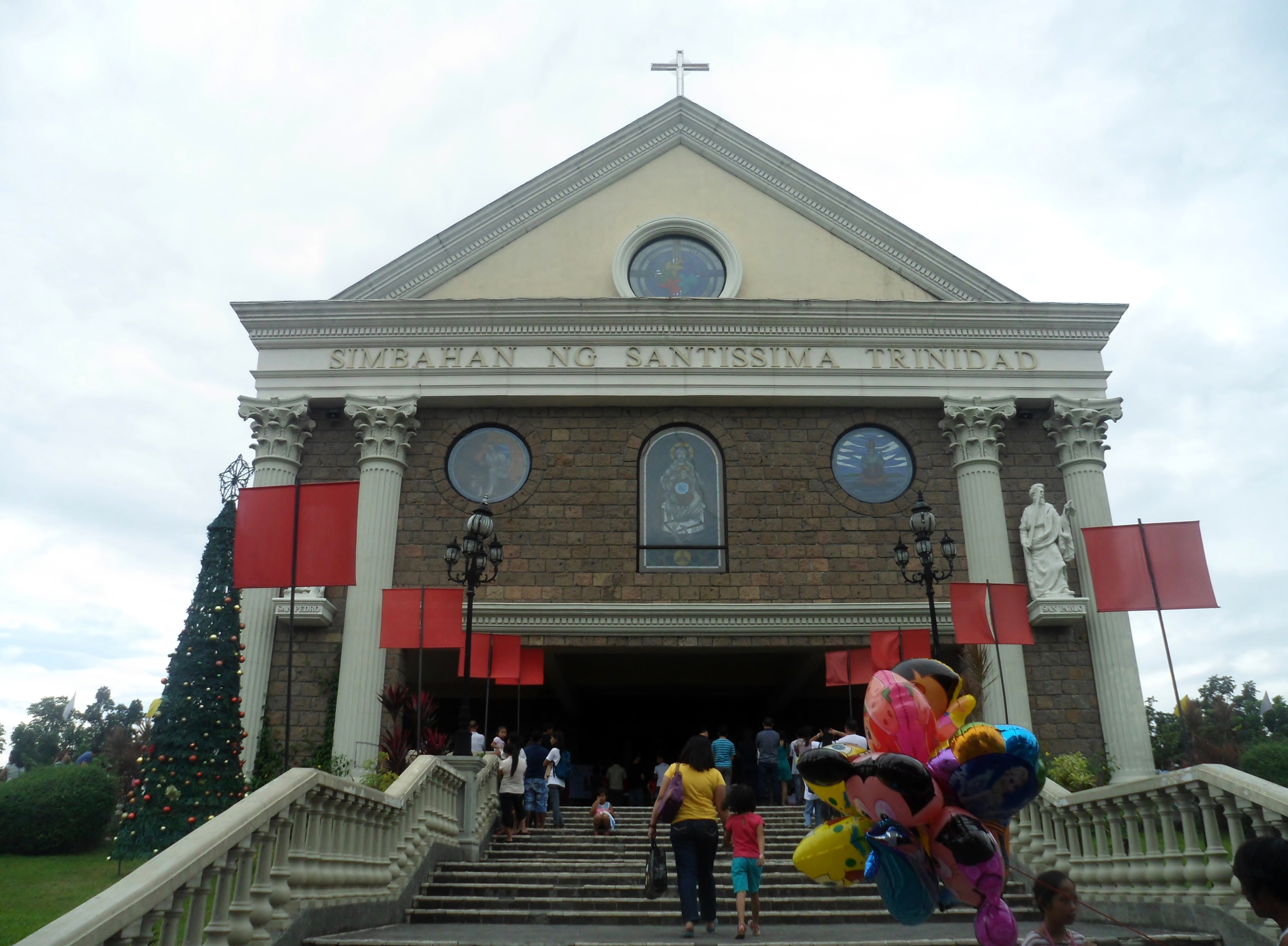
Parish of the Most Holy Trinity in Barangay Pallocan West

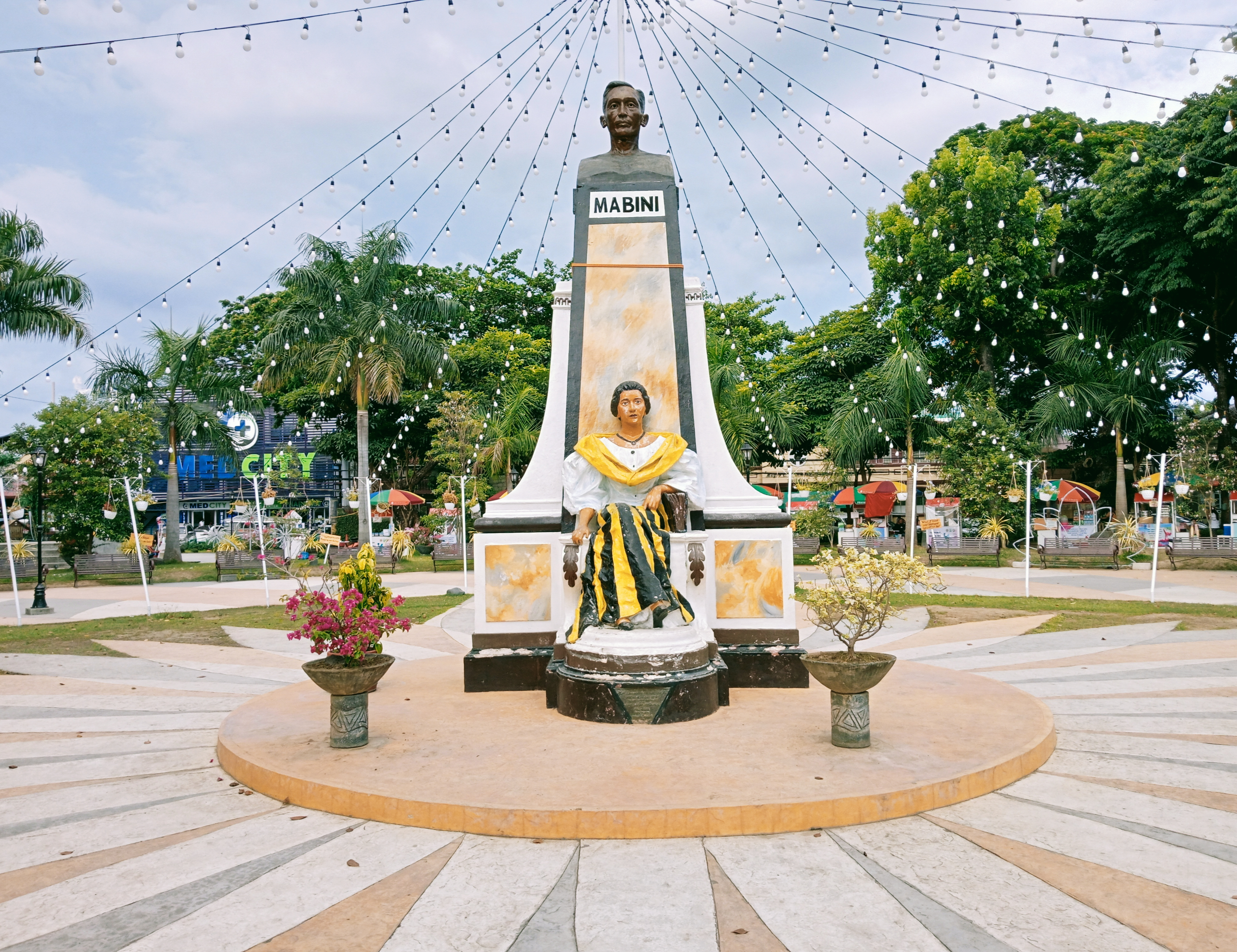
Plaza Mabini

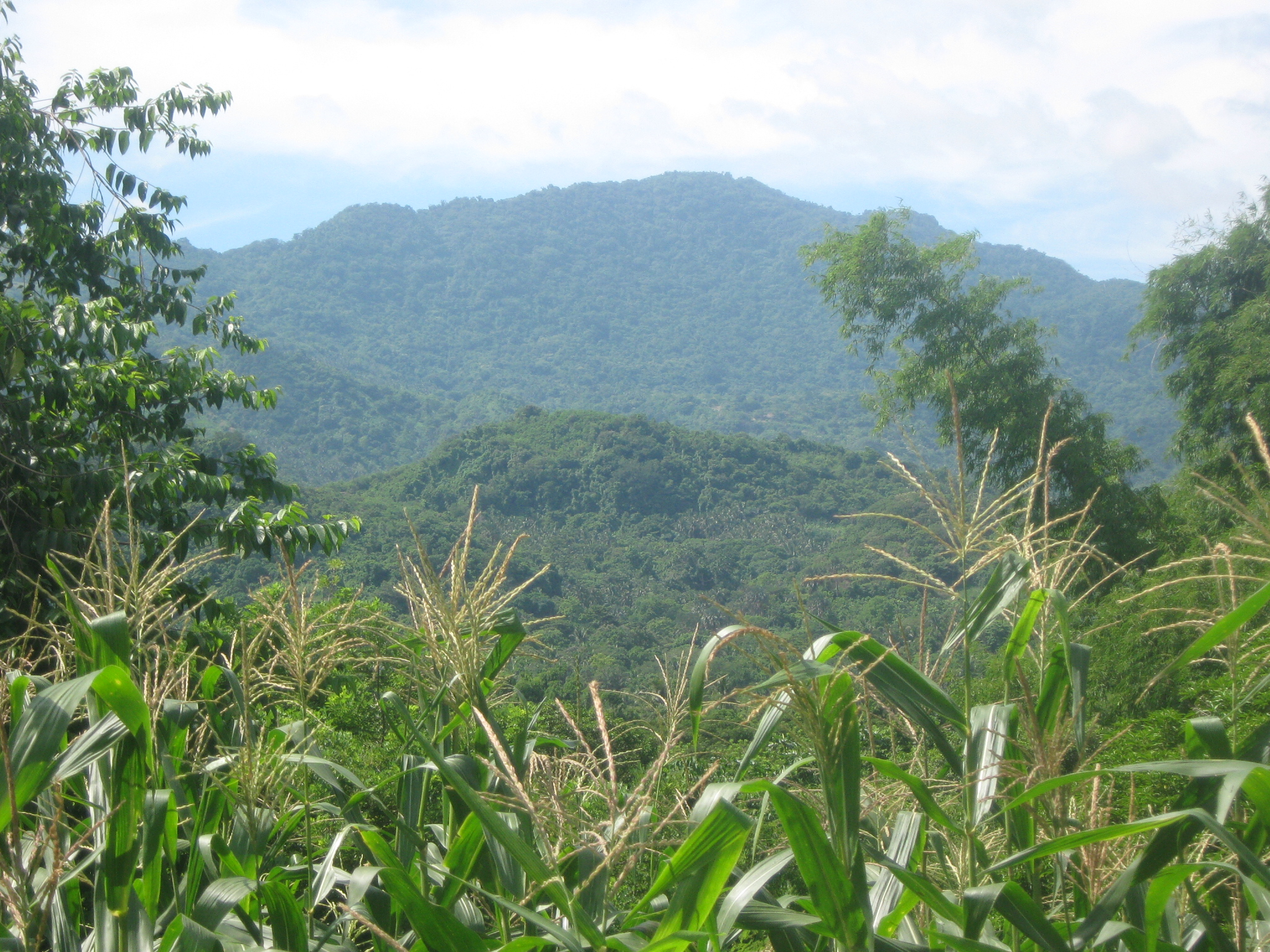
Mount Banoy

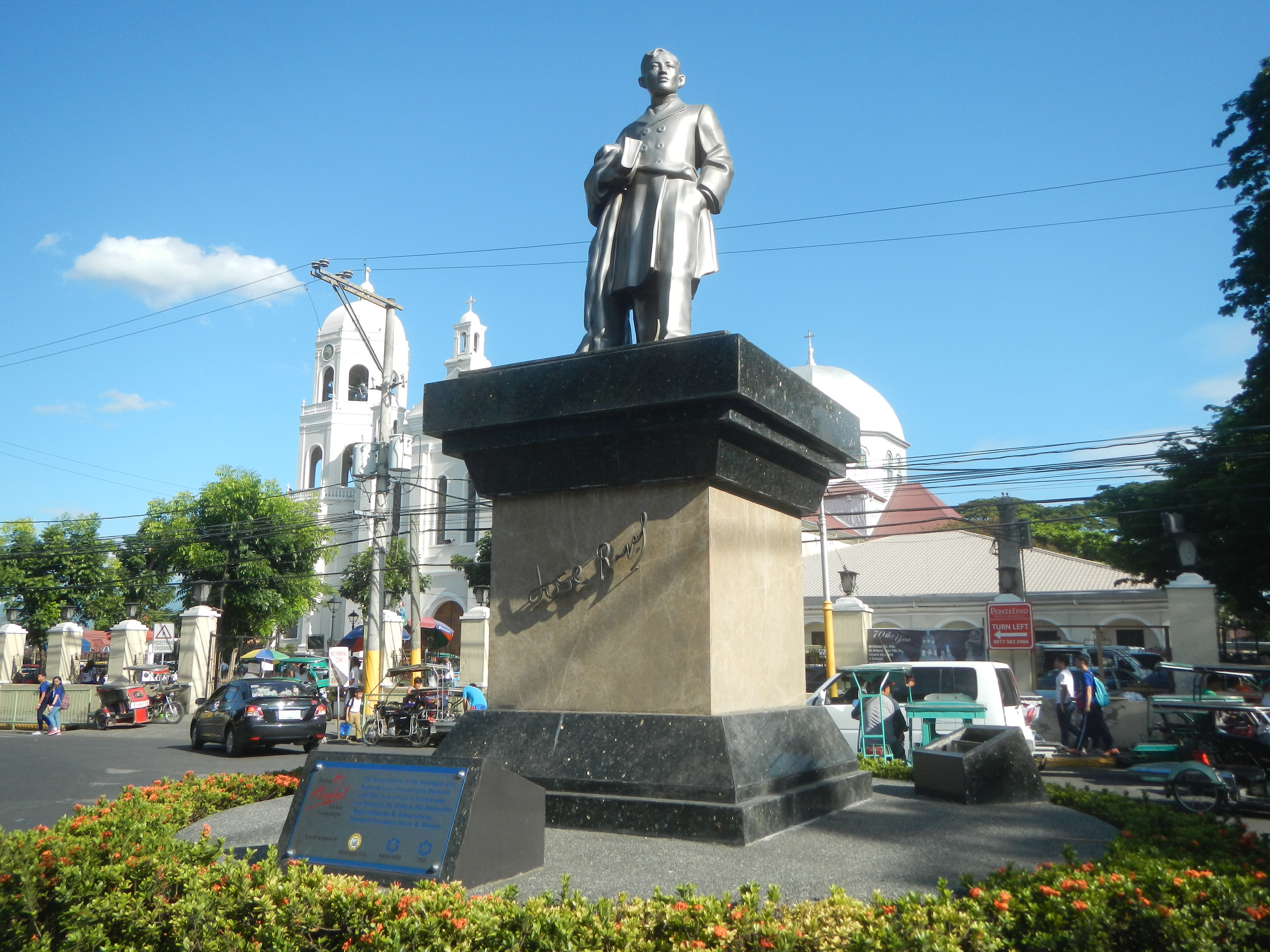
Rizal Monument

Batangas City Sports Center

== Footnotes ==
Preceded by Taal	Capital of Batangas; 1754–present	Incumbent
