= Calumpang River =

River in Batangas, Philippines

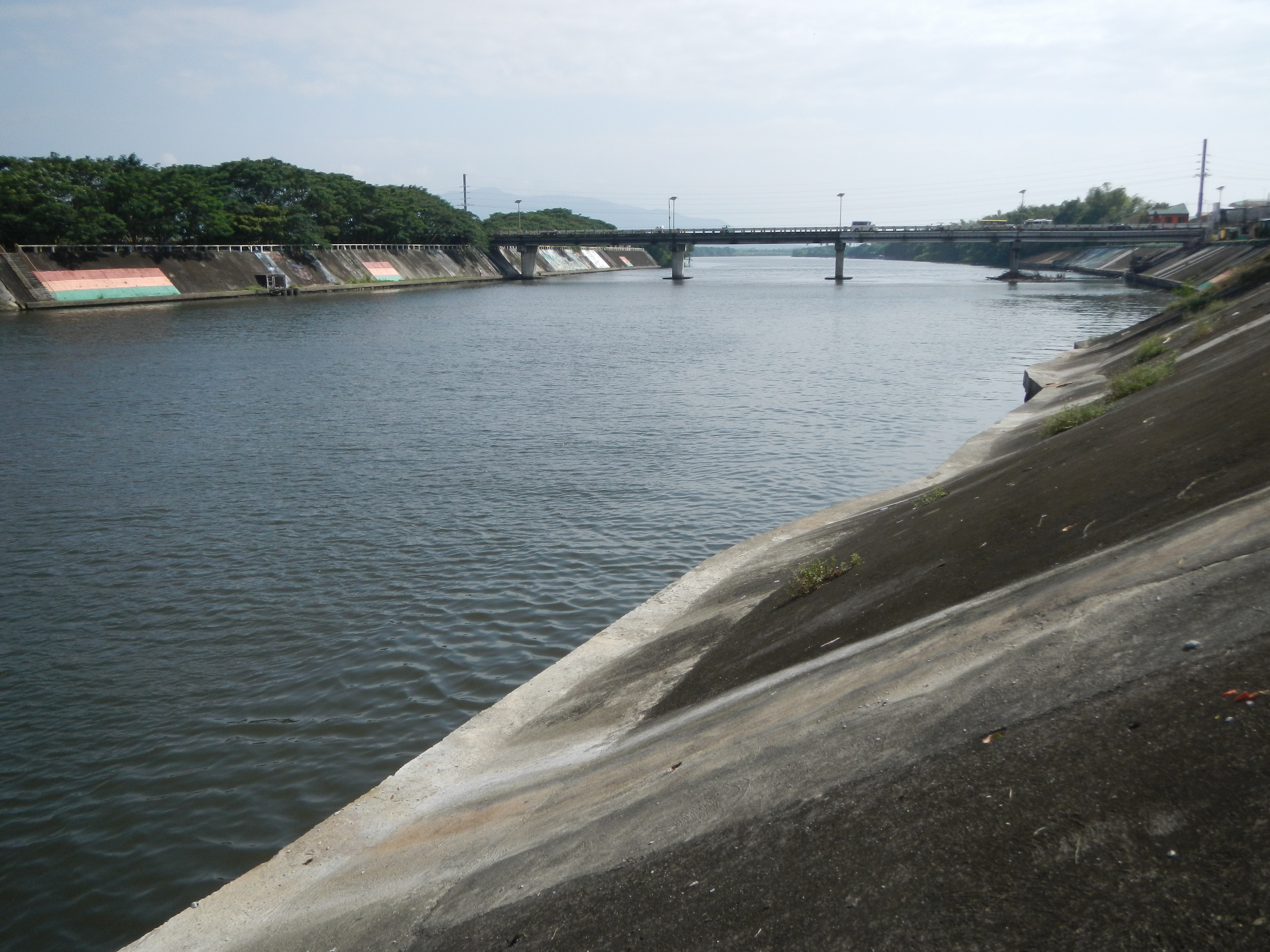
- Calumpang River in Batangas City

- Calumpang River mouth Calumpang River (Philippines)

Location
- Country: Philippines
- Region: Calabarzon
- Province: Batangas
- City/municipality: Batangas City; Ibaan; Taysan; Rosario

Physical characteristics
- Source
  - location: Rosario, Batangas
- Mouth
  - location: Batangas Bay
  - coordinates: 13°44′13″N 121°03′30″E
  - elevation: 0 m (0 ft)
- Basin size: 472 km^{2} (182 sq mi)
- Discharge
  - location: Batangas Bay

The Calumpang River (Tagalog: Ilog Calumpang) is a major river in eastern Batangas, Philippines. Known as the "Nile of Batangas," the river itself forms the southeastern boundary of Poblacion, Batangas City as it continues to flow southward to Batangas Bay at an approximately point of 2 kilometres (1.2 mi) east of Batangas Port.

The river may derive its name from Sterculia foetida, a tree which whose local name is alternately spelled calumpang or kalumpang in Tagalog.

== Legends associated with the river ==
Legend has it that logs, locally known as batang, were floating all over the river. Batang is said to be the root word of Batangan, the former name of the capital city and the province.

Another legend states that a statue of the Holy Infant Jesus on board a Spanish ship en route from Manila to Cebu sought shelter on the coast of city after its voyage was interrupted by a bad weather. The crewmen took the Holy Infant to a small church near the river and sang the Te Deum hymn. The storm miraculously stopped and the ship resumed its trip to Cebu. Soon, the statue was reported missing. At the same time, a deaf-mute boy who was playing along the river found the statue atop a floating log. In memory of this, a floral procession and a bangkarera or boat racing are held on the river every January 16, the Catholic feast day of Batangas City.

== Conservation status ==
The river is now categorized as Class D: this means that its water can only be used for agriculture and manufacturing process after treatment. The factors causing water pollution in the river are direct disposal of household and livestock wastes and untreated sewage.

In response, there have been efforts to revitalize the river most notably the Calumpang River Rehabilitation Campaign.

== See also ==
- List of rivers of the Philippines
