= Batangas Bay =

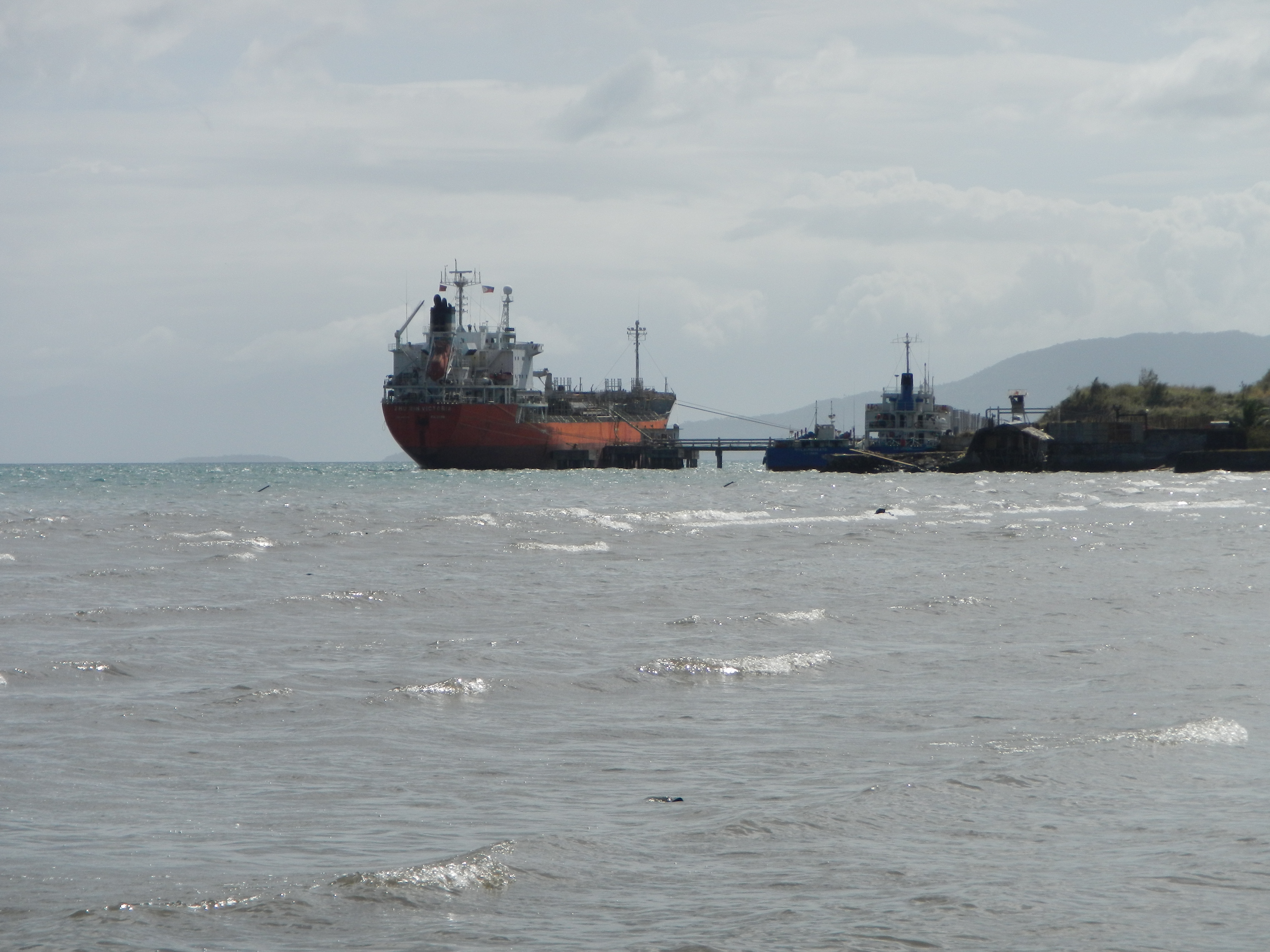
- View of the bay from San Pedro, Bauan

- Location within the Philippines Batangas Bay (Philippines)
- Location: Luzon Island, Philippines
- Coordinates: 13°43′N 121°00′E
- Type: bay
- Settlements: Batangas City; Bauan; Mabini; San Pascual; Tingloy

Batangas Bay is a semi-enclosed body of water situated in the province of Batangas in Luzon island in the Philippines. The bay is an extension of the Verde Island Passage and is separated from Balayan Bay to the west by the Calumpan Peninsula, which juts out to Maricaban Island across the Maricaban Strait.

The water surface area of the bay is about 220 square kilometres (85 sq mi), and the coastline is approximately 92 kilometres (57 mi). The bay has a maximum depth near the entrance of 466 metres (510 yd), and includes a number of private and government ports. The bay is bordered by Batangas City and the municipalities of Mabini, Bauan, San Pascual and Tingloy on Maricaban Island.

The bay is lined with industrial plants ranging from oil refining to food processing to ship building. Many fishermen thrive around the area. The bay is also host to valuable environmental resources, such as coral reefs that attract thousands of tourists every year.
