= Bauan =

Municipality in Batangas, Philippines

- Municipality
- Municipality of Bauan
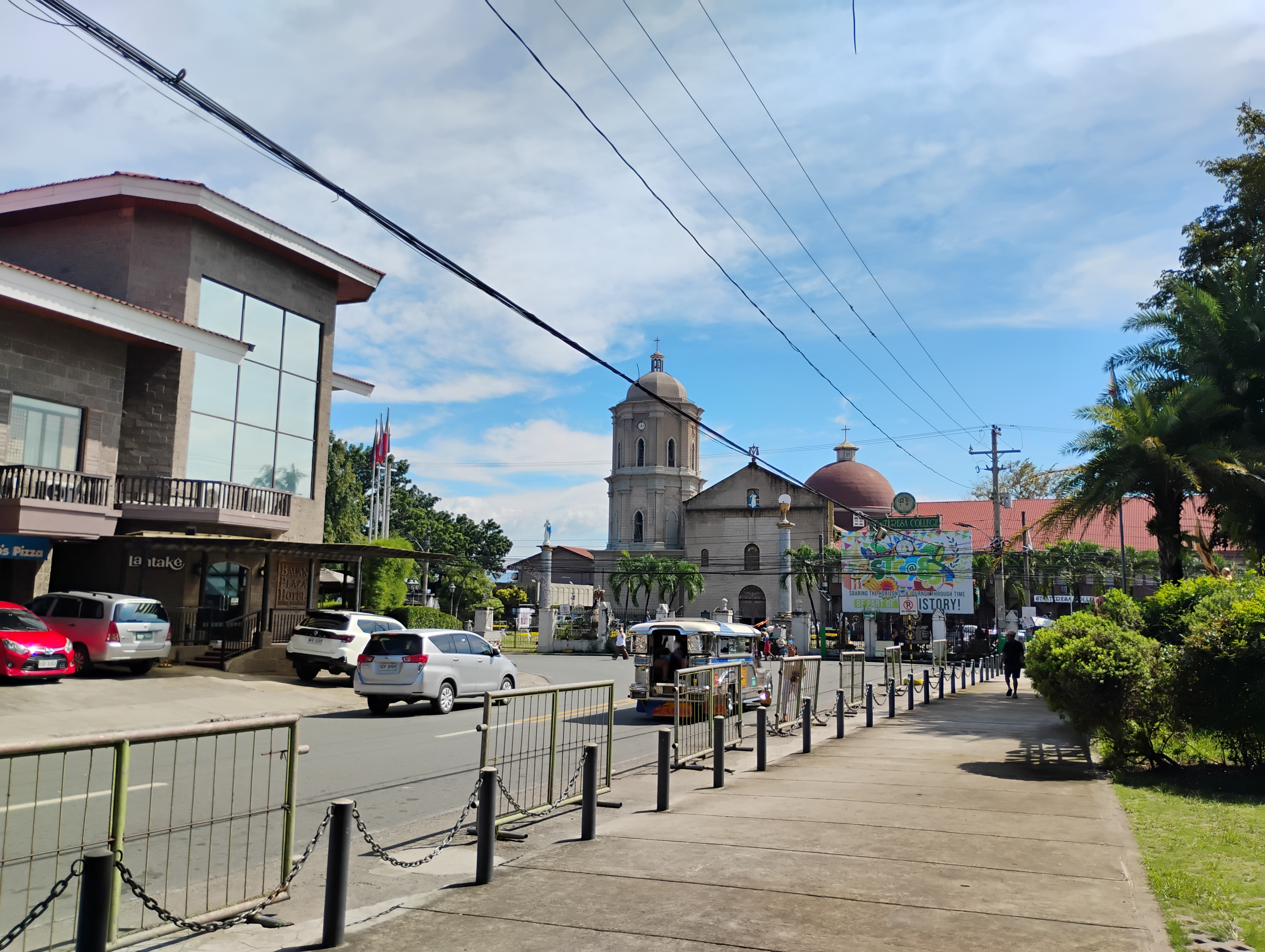
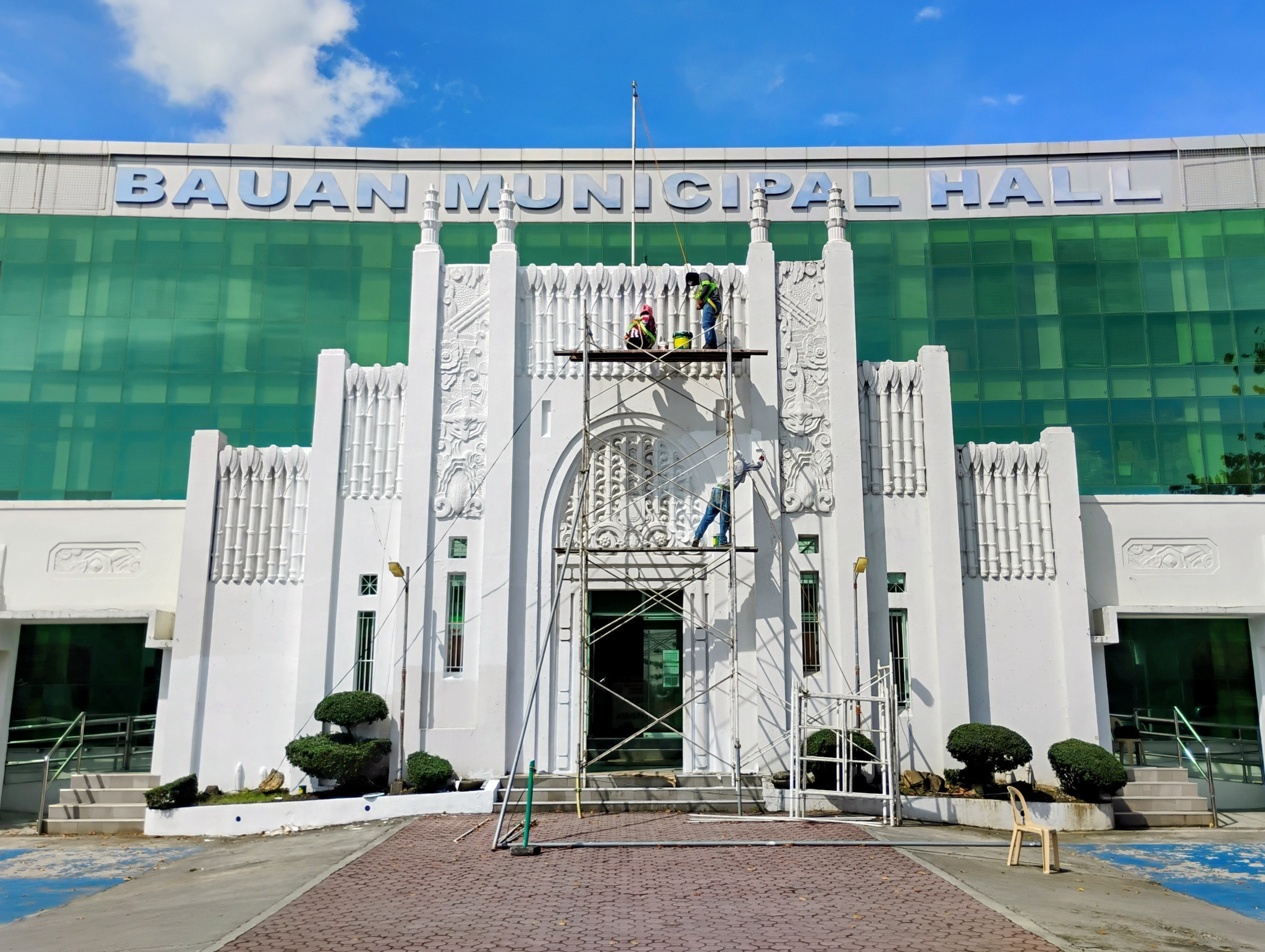
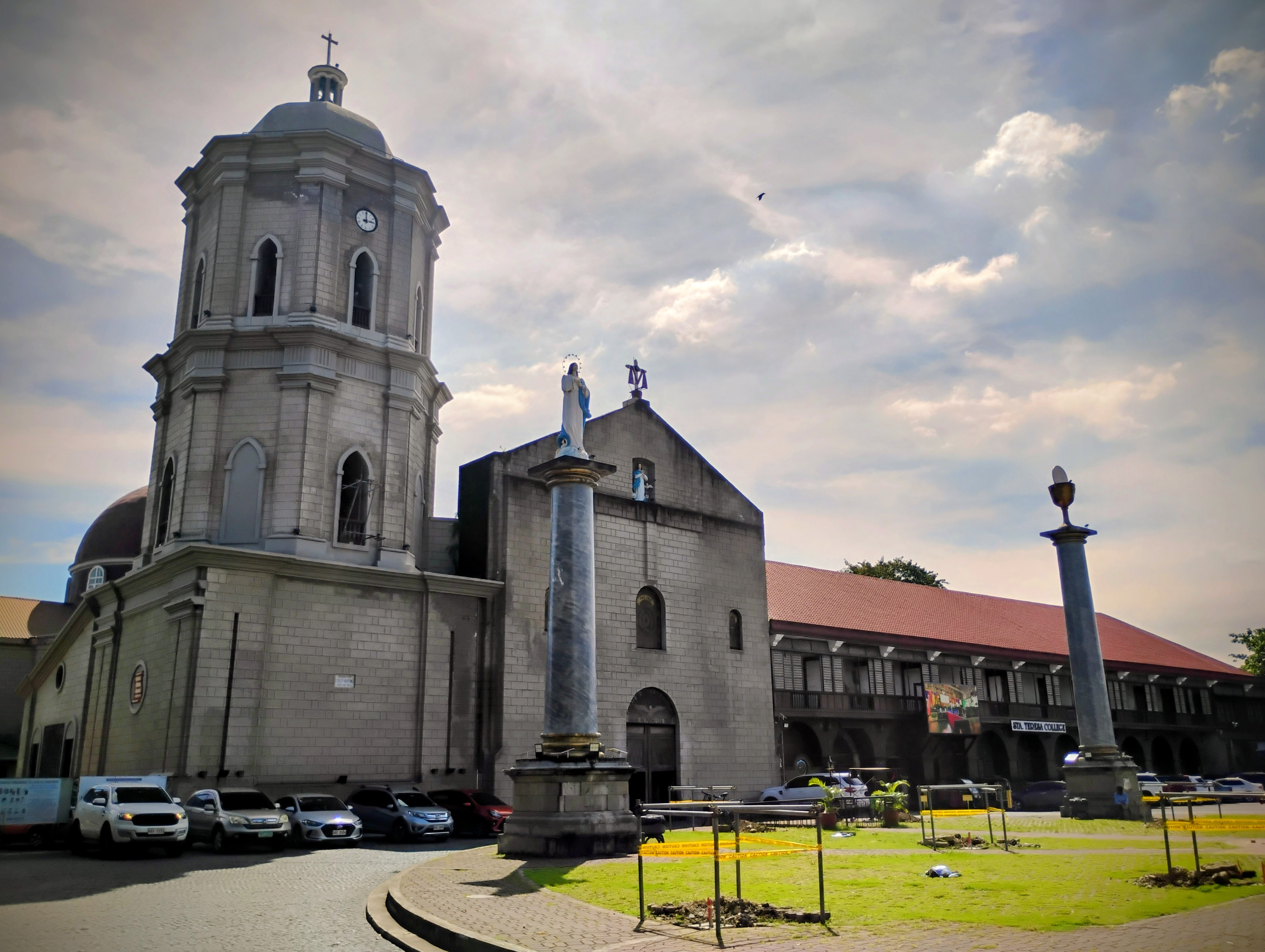
- Bauan Town Proper Bauan Municipal Hall Bauan Church

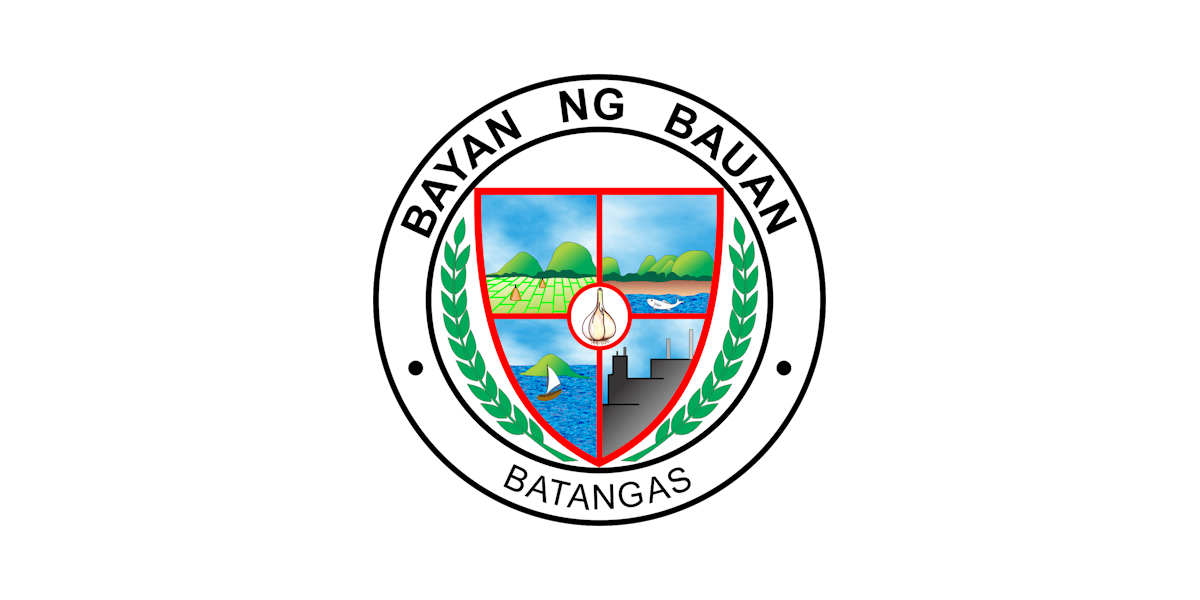
- Flag Seal
- Etymology: báwang (garlic)
- Map of Batangas with Bauan highlighted
- Interactive map of Bauan
- Location within the Philippines
- Coordinates: 13°47′30″N 121°00′31″E
- Country: Philippines
- Region: Calabarzon
- Province: Batangas
- District: 2nd district
- Founded: May 3, 1596
- Barangays: 40 (see Barangays)

Government
  - Type: Sangguniang Bayan
  - Mayor: Wendah Katrina R. Dolor
  - Vice Mayor: Jennelle Claresta Guenn Sandoval-Abante
  - Representative: Gerville R. Luistro
  - Municipal Council: Members: Herminio M. Dolor; Neil P. Valdez; Jennelle Claresta Guenn S. Abante; Romel R. Basilan; Jesimel Jake O. Garcia; Josephine D. Gimeno; Michael T. Endaya; Marjorie Jelly A. Adel
  - Electorate: 60,835 voters (2025)

Area
  - Total: 53.31 km^{2} (20.58 sq mi)
- Elevation: 58 m (190 ft)
- Highest elevation: 274 m (899 ft)
- Lowest elevation: 0 m (0 ft)

Population (2024 census)
  - Total: 94,016
  - Density: 1,764/km^{2} (4,568/sq mi)
  - Households: 22,420

Economy
  - Income class: 1st municipal income class
  - Poverty incidence: 4.95% (2023)
  - Revenue: ₱ 571.6 million (2024)
  - Assets: ₱ 2,358 million (2024)
  - Expenditure: ₱ 204.7 million (2024)
  - Liabilities: ₱ 817.6 million (2024)

Service provider
  - Electricity: First Bay Power Corporation (FBP)
- Time zone: UTC+8 (PST)
- ZIP code: 4201
- PSGC: 0401006000
- IDD : area code: +63 (0)43
- Native languages: Tagalog
- Website: www.bauan.gov.ph

Bauan, officially the Municipality of Bauan (Tagalog: Bayan ng Bauan), is a municipality in the province of Batangas, Philippines. According to the 2024 census, it has a population of 94,016 people.

== Etymology ==
Bauan derived its name from the following Tagalog words:

- bauang that means "a close or concealed and rugged mountains;" or
- bawang that translates to garlic that farmers were planting near Taal Lake when they were asked by a Spanish official about the name of the place, not what they were planting as they thought to be

Since then, the place's name was registered as Bauang, which was later renamed to Bauan.

== History ==
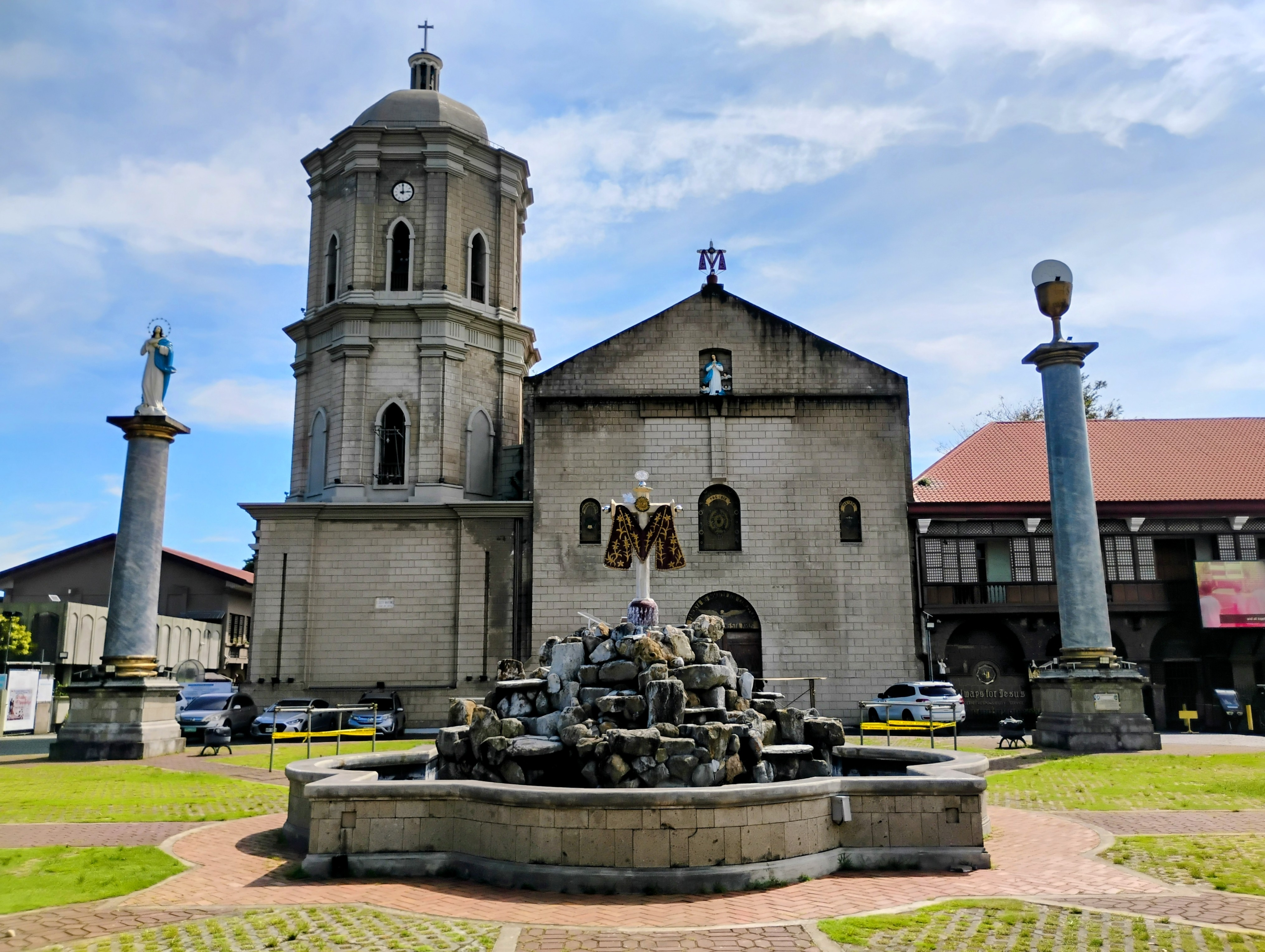
Bauan Church

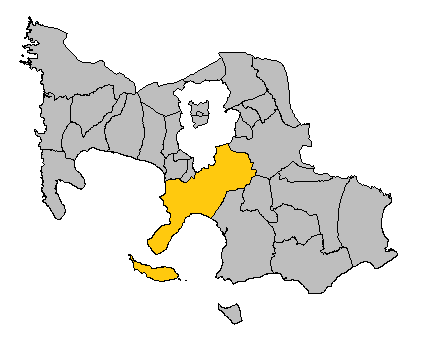
Largest extent of Bauan (yellow) in current map of Batangas

Bauan is formerly a barrio part of Taal. The Augustinian church of Bauan was founded as a visita (small chapel without a resident priest) in 1590 on the slopes of Mount Macolod, along Taal Lake's southern shore. The resident priest of Taal, Father Diego de Avila would visit periodically and attend to the spiritual needs of the settlement.

Six years after the establishment of the ecclesiastical mission of Bauan, a giant cross made of anubing was found in a Diñgin (a place of worship) near the town of Alitagtag. In 1790, Castro y Amoedo found a Tagalog document in the Bauan Cathedral Archives, signed by 25 Indio elders, stating the cross was made around 1595, as protection from ghosts surrounding the Tolo fountain. Subsequent miracles were associated with this cross. On May 3, the 2.5-meter (8 ft 2 in) tall cross was brought to the Chapel of Alitagtag. A golden sun, with a human face, and radiating rays was added, while the devout would cut away pieces of the cross to make talisman replicas. The elders also thought the cross protected the town from pestilence, locusts, drought, volcanic eruptions, and Moro pirates.

Today, the traditional folk dance of Bauan, subli, is a religious homage to the Cross of Alitagtag. The dance is performed at a sambahan (place of worship), two of which are natural grottos along the shore of Taal Lake, and one of which is called Diñgin.

Bauan became an independent parish on May 12, 1596, but was re-annexed to Taal, its matriz (mother town), because of too few tributos (taxpayers). Due to Taal Volcano eruptions, the town moved to Durungao (lookout point), led by Father Jose Rodriguez, in 1662. The town moved again in 1671 to Loual, along Taal's Seno de Bauan. An earthquake struck the town in 1677. In 1689, Father Nicolas de Rivera helped the town build its third church. In 1690, Father Rivera, with the help of the Taal parish priest Father Simon Martinez, moved the town to the seaside, its present location. However, a typhoon destroyed the church in 1692.

A fourth stone church was built from 1695 to 1710. The current church was built in 1762 by Father Jose Victoria and Don Juan Bandino. A fort was built in 1775 to protect the town from Moro raids.

Fr. Jose Vitoria introduced the cultivation of indigo in Bauan while building the present church. This was continued until 1856 during the administrations of Fr. Jose Trevino and Fr. Hipolito Huerta. It was completed under the supervision of Fr. Felipe Bravo in 1881. From there until 1894, final decorations were supervised by Fr. Moises Santos and Fr. Felipe Garcia. The church is said to be the most artistically built in the province of Batangas during that time. Father Bravo was also an imminent botanist who put up a museum of natural history and collected rare books that were lost when the church was razed by fire during the Philippine revolution against Spain in 1898. The church was probably rebuilt and again destroyed by fire in 1938. It has been restored since then.

The town of Bauan used to encompass a much more extensive area. However, throughout history, chunks of Bauan have been converted into municipalities; San Jose in 1765, Alitagtag in 1910, Mabini in 1918, Tingloy in 1955, and San Pascual in 1969.

In March 2019, the Black Nazarene visited the church to help funds for rebuilding after the church was damaged in the 2017 Batangas earthquakes.

== Geography ==
Bauan is one of the lowland towns of central Batangas that hosts some mountains and hills, with the tallest; Mount Durungao. It also has beach resorts with Sampaguita Beach in barangay Sampaguita in the western part of the town considered one of the more notable ones.

The town is bounded by the municipality of San Luis to the north, the municipality of San Pascual to the east, and the municipality of Mabini to the south/southwest. It is also bordered by Balayan Bay to the west and Batangas Bay to the southeast. Vehicles can access the municipality coming from those towns by way of large thoroughfares such as the Palico-Balayan-Batangas Road, the Bauan-Mabini Road and Makalintal Avenue. Bauan is 7 kilometers (4.3 mi) from Batangas City and 112 kilometers (70 mi) from Manila.

According to the Philippine Statistics Authority, the municipality has a land area of 53.31 square kilometers (20.58 sq mi) constituting 1.71% of the 3,119.75-square-kilometer (1,204.54 sq mi) total area of Batangas.

=== Barangays ===
Bauan is politically subdivided into 40 barangays, as indicated in the matrix below. Each barangay consists of puroks and some have sitios.

PSGC	Barangay	Population			±% p.a.	
		2024		2010		
041006001	Alagao	2.7%	2,496	1,836	▴	2.15%
041006002	Aplaya	8.5%	8,038	7,604	▴	0.39%
041006003	As‑Is	2.5%	2,344	2,239	▴	0.32%
041006004	Bagong Silang	0.5%	457	410	▴	0.76%
041006005	Baguilawa	1.6%	1,535	1,412	▴	0.58%
041006006	Balayong	2.9%	2,746	2,496	▴	0.66%
041006007	Barangay I (Poblacion)	1.7%	1,619	1,492	▴	0.57%
041006008	Barangay II (Poblacion)	3.3%	3,148	3,062	▴	0.19%
041006009	Barangay III (Poblacion)	0.6%	583	556	▴	0.33%
041006010	Barangay IV (Poblacion)	3.2%	2,977	2,432	▴	1.41%
041006011	Bolo	5.6%	5,311	4,212	▴	1.62%
041006012	Colvo	0.6%	545	495	▴	0.67%
041006013	Cupang	2.0%	1,897	1,808	▴	0.33%
041006014	Durungao	1.9%	1,776	1,487	▴	1.24%
041006015	Gulibay	1.4%	1,352	1,419	▾	−0.33%
041006016	Inicbulan	3.9%	3,674	3,007	▴	1.40%
041006018	Locloc	1.6%	1,517	1,605	▾	−0.39%
041006019	Magalang‑Galang	0.4%	340	345	▾	−0.10%
041006020	Malindig	0.4%	358	391	▾	−0.61%
041006021	Manalupang	1.4%	1,352	1,065	▴	1.67%
041006022	Manghinao Proper	11.5%	10,789	7,974	▴	2.12%
041006023	Manghinao Uno	2.7%	2,556	2,378	▴	0.50%
041006024	New Danglayan	2.0%	1,878	1,757	▴	0.46%
041006025	Orense	0.8%	742	712	▴	0.29%
041006026	Pitugo	0.9%	801	643	▴	1.54%
041006028	Rizal	0.8%	745	699	▴	0.44%
041006029	Sampaguita	0.6%	522	536	▾	−0.18%
041006030	San Agustin	1.1%	1,046	931	▴	0.81%
041006031	San Andres Proper	2.8%	2,674	2,623	▴	0.13%
041006032	San Andres Uno	0.7%	654	584	▴	0.79%
041006033	San Diego	0.6%	521	518	▴	0.04%
041006034	San Miguel	1.9%	1,818	1,829	▾	−0.04%
041006035	San Pablo	0.9%	838	814	▴	0.20%
041006036	San Pedro	2.5%	2,327	2,080	▴	0.78%
041006037	San Roque	7.1%	6,634	6,110	▴	0.57%
041006038	San Teodoro	1.9%	1,788	1,627	▴	0.66%
041006039	San Vicente	0.8%	778	613	▴	1.67%
041006041	Santa Maria	5.5%	5,129	4,763	▴	0.51%
041006042	Santo Domingo	2.6%	2,407	2,285	▴	0.36%
041006044	Sinala	2.7%	2,585	2,502	▴	0.23%
	Total		94,016	81,351	▴	1.01%

Barangay San Teodoro was created in 1953 from the sitio of Pook ng Buhangin from Barrio Ilat and the sitio of Cupang from Barrio Gelerang Kawayan. In 1954, the sitio of Jipit in the barrio of San Antonio was converted into the barrio of Santo Niño, while the sitio of Pook ni Banal in the Barrio of Malaking Pook was converted into the barrio of Pook ni Banal. The next year, sitio Pinagcurusan in barrio Maricaban and sitio Pinagcurusan in barrio Tingloy were constituted into barrio San Jose, while sitio Pirasan in barrio Payapa was constituted into the barrio of San Juan. In 1956 portions of San Andres and Bolo were separated to form the barrio of San Miguel. The next year, sitio Puting Buhangin of Barrio Magalanggalang was converted into barrio Orense.

=== Climate ===
Climate data for Bauan, Batangas
Month	Jan	Feb	Mar	Apr	May	Jun	Jul	Aug	Sep	Oct	Nov	Dec	Year
Mean daily maximum °C (°F)	29 (84)	30 (86)	31 (88)	33 (91)	32 (90)	30 (86)	29 (84)	29 (84)	29 (84)	29 (84)	29 (84)	29 (84)	30 (86)
Mean daily minimum °C (°F)	20 (68)	20 (68)	21 (70)	22 (72)	24 (75)	24 (75)	24 (75)	24 (75)	24 (75)	23 (73)	22 (72)	21 (70)	22 (72)
Average precipitation mm (inches)	11 (0.4)	13 (0.5)	14 (0.6)	32 (1.3)	101 (4.0)	142 (5.6)	208 (8.2)	187 (7.4)	175 (6.9)	131 (5.2)	68 (2.7)	39 (1.5)	1,121 (44.3)
Average rainy days	5.2	5.0	7.4	11.5	19.8	23.5	27.0	25.9	25.2	23.2	15.5	8.3	197.5
Source: Meteoblue (Use with caution: this is modeled/calculated data, not measured locally.)

== Demographics ==
Population census of Bauan
Year	Pop.	±% p.a.
1903	39,094	—
1918	27,729	−2.26%
1939	37,043	+1.39%
1948	40,168	+0.90%
1960	41,147	+0.20%
1970	36,862	−1.09%
1975	38,200	+0.72%
1980	43,560	+2.66%
1990	59,258	+3.13%
1995	64,190	+1.51%
2000	72,604	+2.68%
2007	79,831	+1.32%
2010	81,351	+0.69%
2015	91,297	+2.22%
2020	90,819	−0.11%
2024	94,016	+0.83%
Source: Philippine Statistics Authority

In the 2024 census, Bauan had a population of 94,016 people. The population density was 1,800 inhabitants per square kilometer (4,700/sq mi).

== Economy ==
Poverty incidence of Bauan (%)

Source: Philippine Statistics Authority

Bauan is one of three political entities included in Metro Batangas, and as such has contributed to its continuous growth in businesses and population. It is also home to a handful of tourist destinations and points of interest.

Restaurants found in the national capital region Metro Manila have their branches in the town. There are also some shopping centers and malls. Fresh fruits, vegetables, meat, and fish are sold there. Household items such as brooms, appliances, sewing supplies can also be found in the town's market.The town is home to the famous Londres, a soft bread coated in sugar, and Pianono, a rolled bread with cream inside.

While Bauan is known as "the Gateway to Mabini," an adjacent town known for its beaches, Bauan has Sampaguita beach. It is a long, white-sand beach that is relatively underdeveloped but fairly accessible. and is already being flocked by tourists. There is also a river in Bauan called the Abaksa River that can be found in between Inicbulan and Balayong. It is a fairly shallow river with cool waters and is also relatively underdeveloped.

== Infrastructure ==
=== Bauan International Port ===
The ICTSI's wholly owned subsidiary, Bauan International Ports, Inc. is developing the $800 million Luzon International Container Terminal (LICT). The country's second-largest container facility which will start its operations in 2028. The largest private marine terminal is a 20-hectare multi-purpose, multi-user terminal along Batangas Bay in Bauan. It has a two million twenty-foot equivalent units capacity, with 900 meters of quay and eight ship-to-shore gantry cranes, handling ro-ro, project and containerized cargo.

== Education ==
The Bauan Schools District Office governs all educational institutions within the municipality. It oversees the management and operations of all private and public, from primary to secondary schools.

=== Primary and elementary schools ===
- Alagao-Malindig Elementary School
- Baguilawa Elementary School
- Balayong Elementary School
- Bauan Adventist Elementary School
- Bauan East Central School
- Blessed Kids Palace Montessori
- Bolo Elementary School
- Centex Batangas
- Children of Heaven Learning Center
- Christian School of Bauan
- Colvo Elementary School
- Cupang Elementary School
- Divine Care Christian School
- Durungao Elementary School
- Faith Kingswood Academy
- Holy Queen Learning Academy
- Inicbulan Elementary School
- Locloc Elementary School
- Manalupang - San Vicente Elementary School
- Manghinao Elementary School
- Manghinao I Elementary School
- Mobile Learning and Tutorial Center
- New Danglayan - Sto. Domingo Elementary School
- Our Lady of Lourdes School
- Pitugo Elementary School
- San Andres Elementary School
- San Diego Elementary School
- San Pablo Elementary School
- San Roque Elementary School
- San Teodoro Elementary School
- Shepherd's Flock Learning Center
- Shilonite Kids Montessori
- Sinala Elementary School
- St. John Berchmans Creative Learning Center
- St. Josemaria Escriva Montessori School
- St. Jude Elementary School of Learning
- St. Mark's Institute
- Sta. Maria - San Pedro Elementary School
- Sunhill Montessori Casa-Bauan
- West Bauan Central School

=== Secondary schools ===
- Bauan National Agricultural and Vocational High School
- Bauan Technical High School
- Inicbulan National High School
- San Vicente Manalupang National High School

=== Higher educational institution ===
- Santa Teresa College

== Notable personalities ==
- Cecilia Muñoz-Palma, a former associate justice
- Hermilando Mandanas, governor, congressional representative and vice governor of Batangas
- Joshua Garcia, actor
- Raneo Abu, politician
- Rommel Sandoval, a hero of Marawi siege
- Voltaire Y. Rosales, Executive Judge of Batangas Regional Trial Court

== Gallery ==
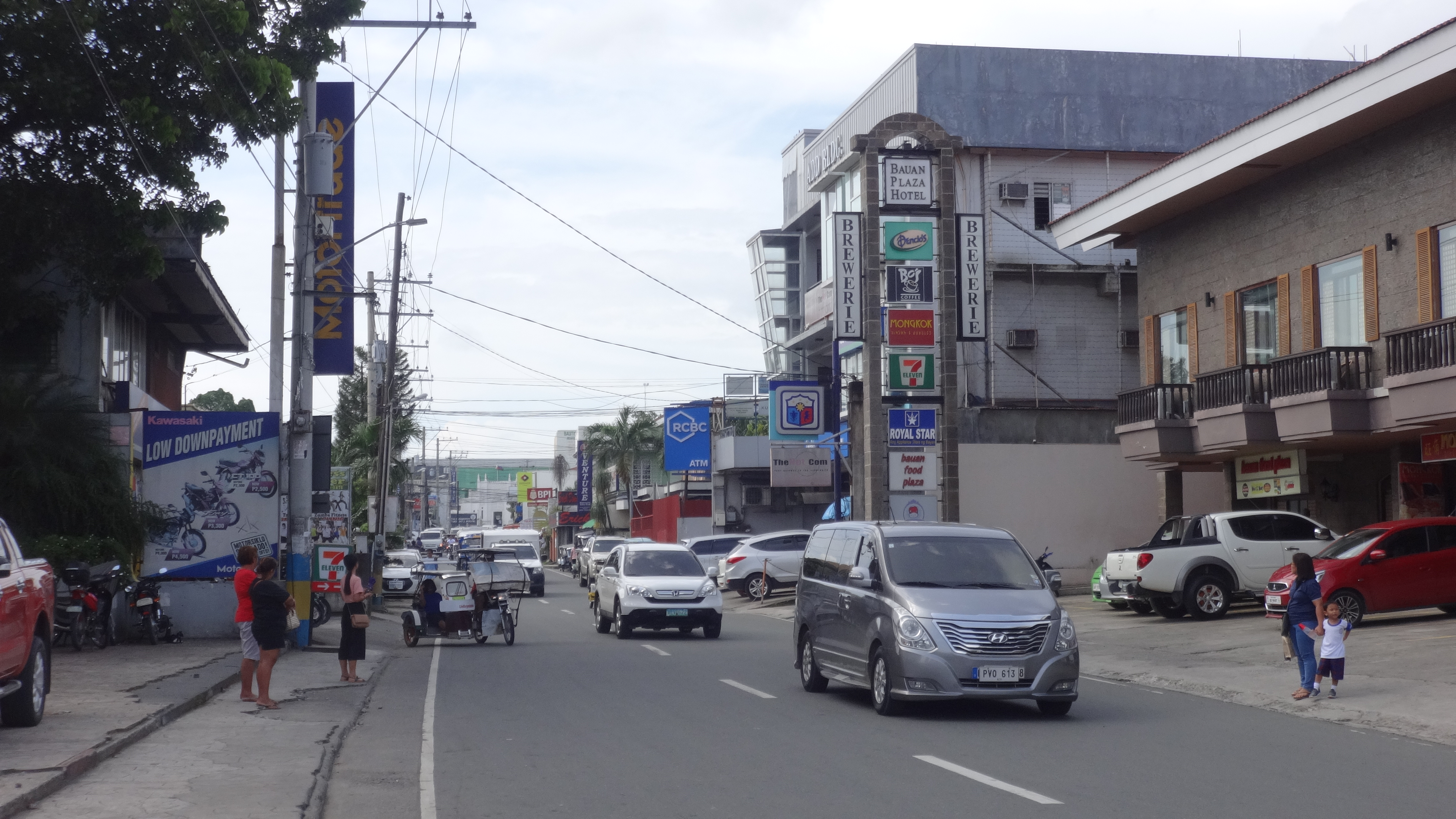
J.P. Rizal St. looking towards north

Municipal Hall of Bauan

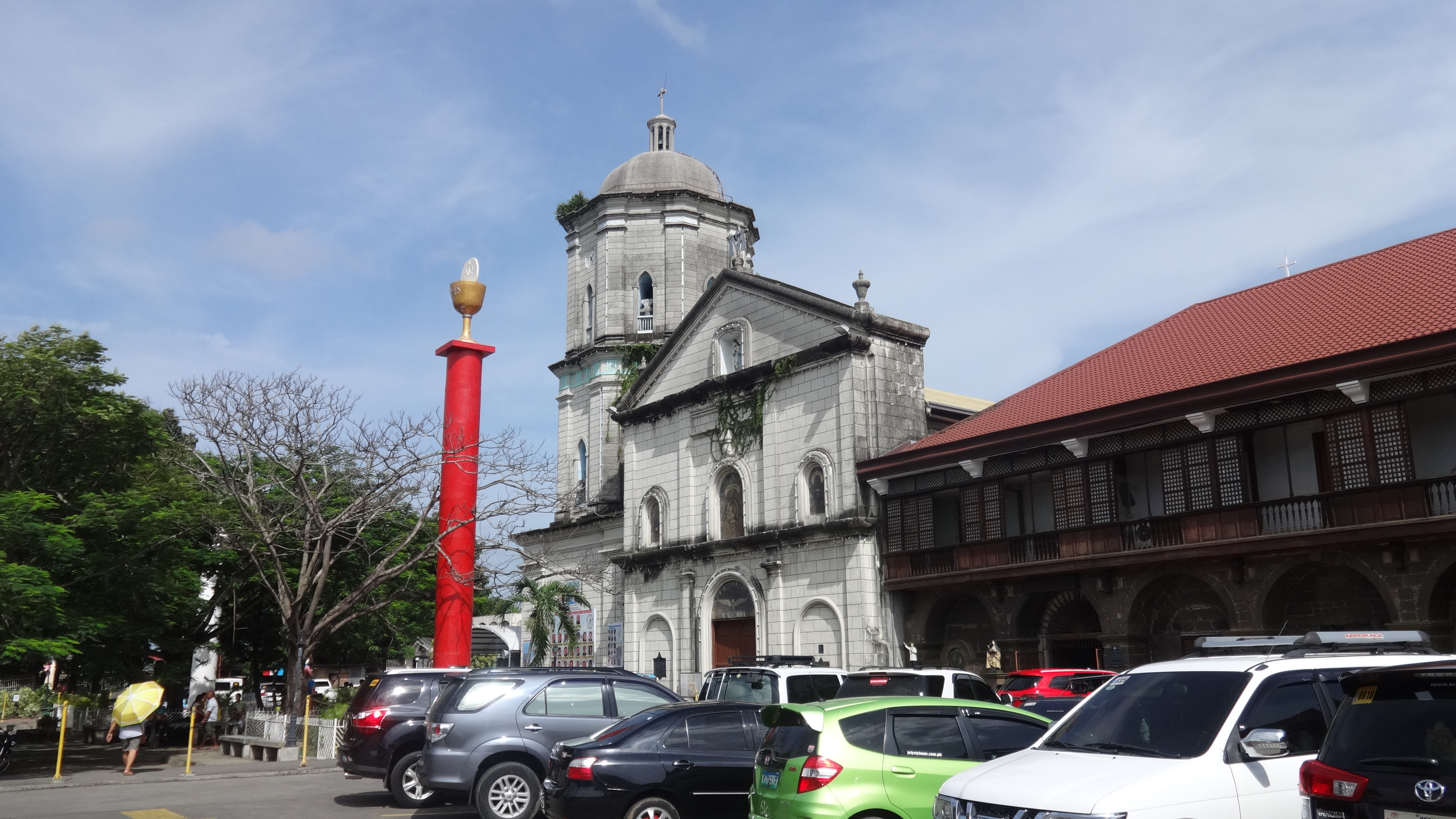
Immaculada Concepcion Parish Church

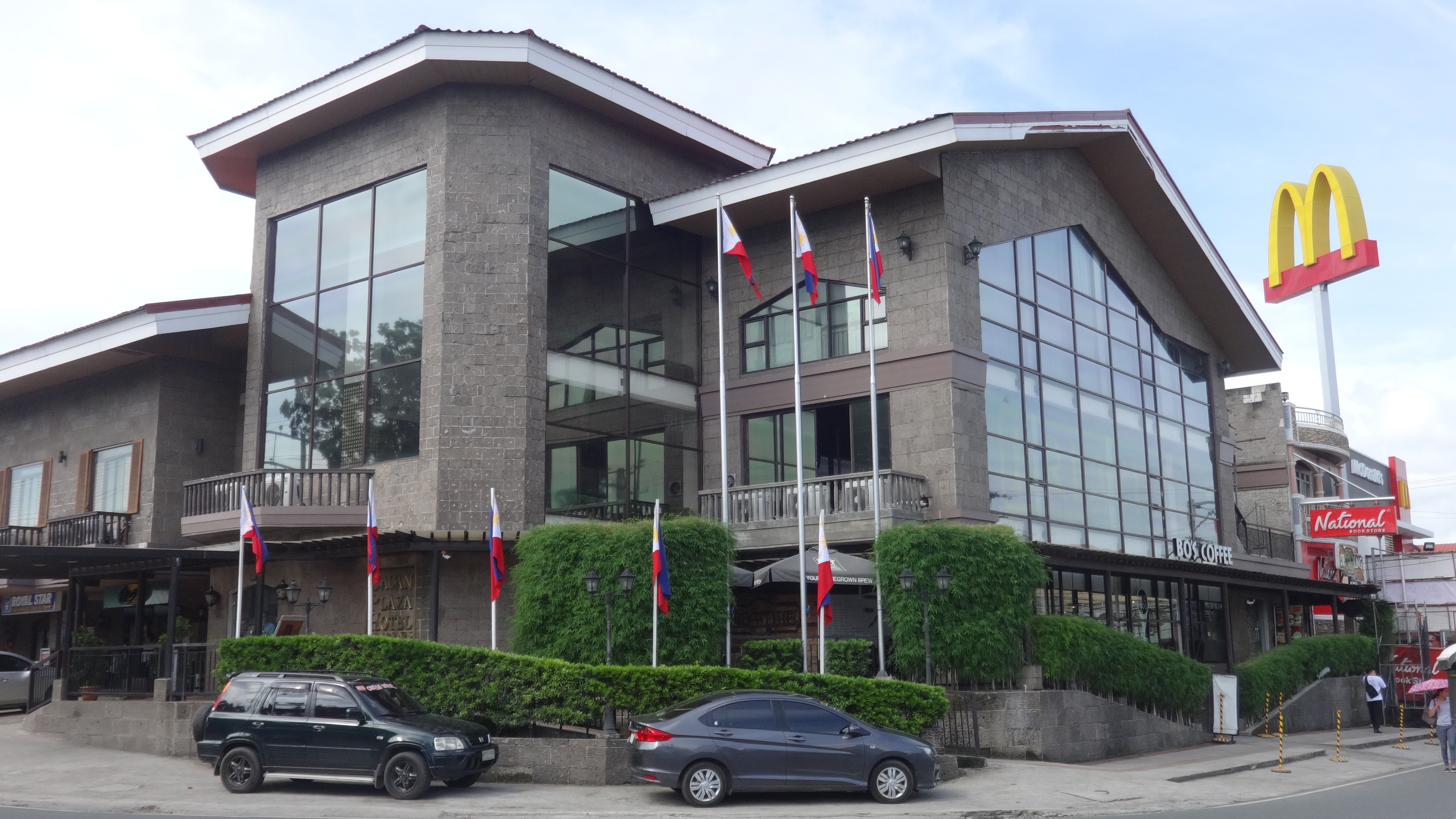
Bauan Plaza Hotel

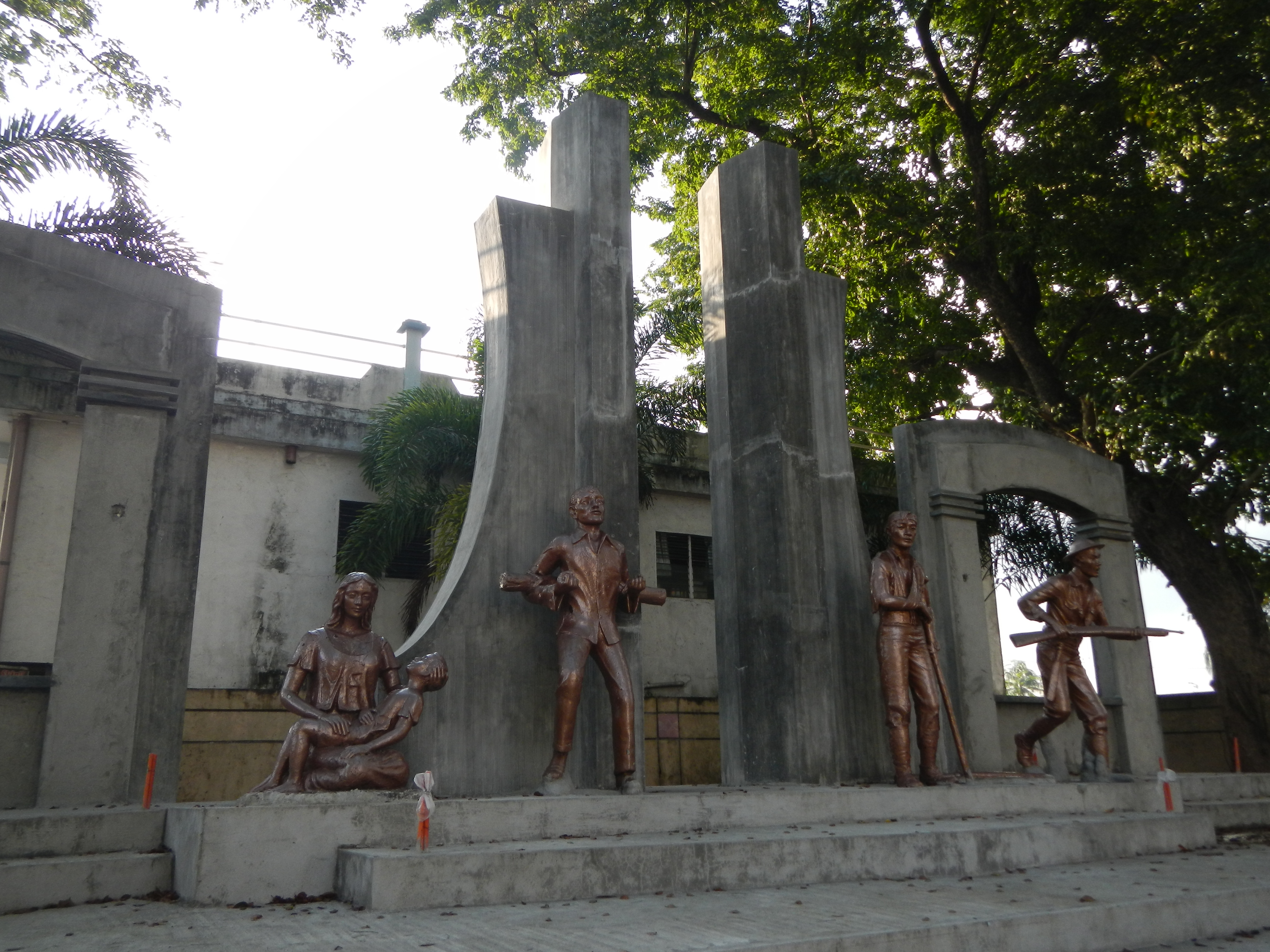
Plaza Orense Monument

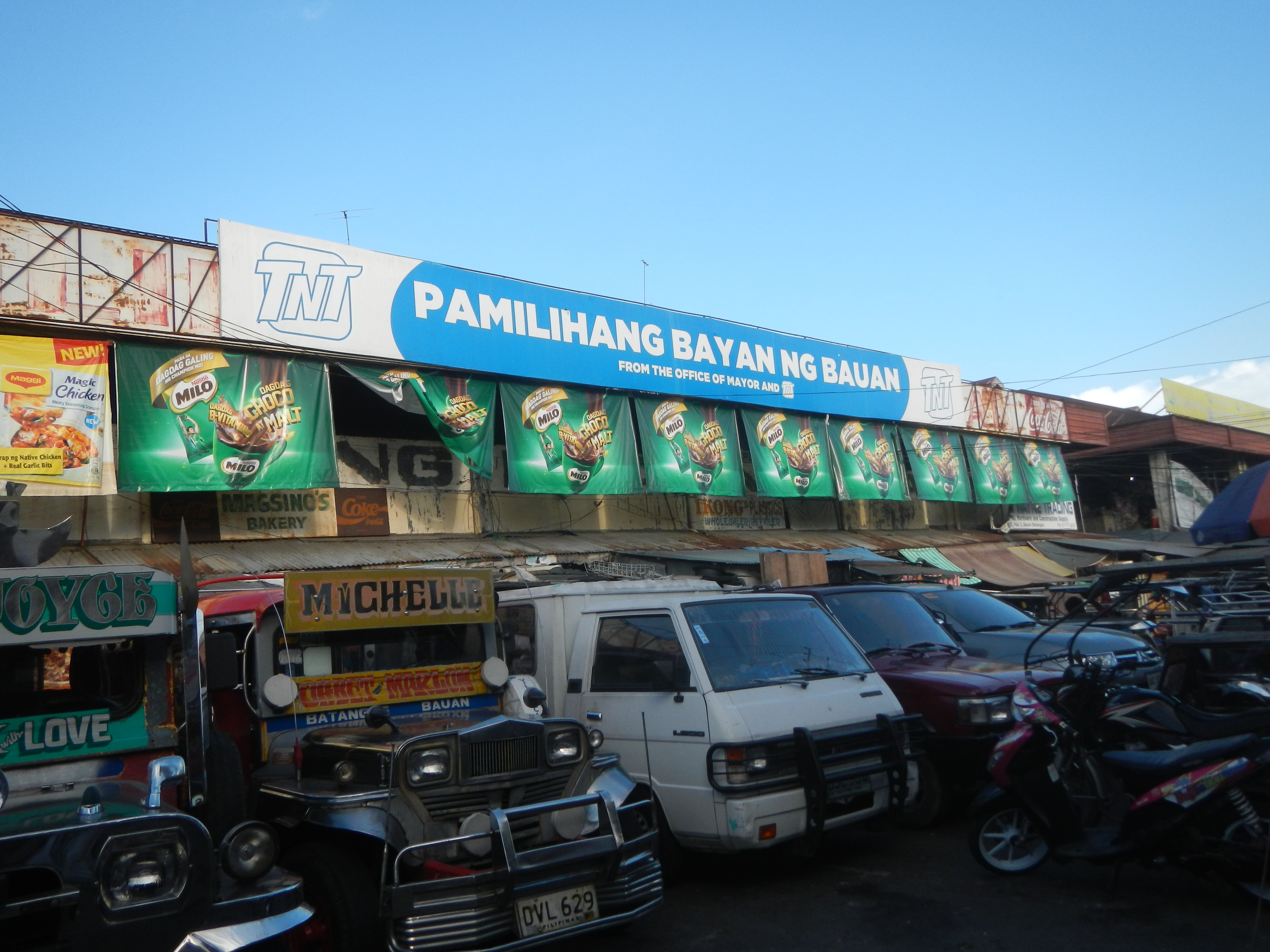
Bauan Market
