= Maricaban =

Maricaban may refer to the following places in the Philippines:

- Maricaban Island, the main island that composes most of the municipality of Tingloy in the province of Batangas
  - Marikaban, barangay in the municipality of Tingloy in the province of Batangas
  - Maricaban Strait, which separates Maricaban Island (Tingloy) from the mainland of Luzon
- Maricaban Island, islet in the municipality of Quezon in the province of Palawan
- Maricaban, barangay in the municipality of Santa Fe in the province of Cebu
- Maricaban Bay, bay on the north shore of Busuanga Island in the province of Palawan
