= Luistro =

Luistro is a surname. Notable people with the surname include:

- Armin Luistro (born 1961), Filipino secretary
- Gerville Luistro (born 1975), Filipino lawyer and politician
