= Batangas's 2nd congressional district =

House of Representatives of the Philippines legislative district

- Constituency for the House of Representatives of the Philippines
- Map Boundary of Batangas's 2nd congressional district
- Location of Batangas within the Philippines
- Province: Batangas
- Region: Calabarzon
- Population: 306,809 (2020)
- Electorate: 196,497 (2022)
- Major settlements: 6 LGUs: Municipalities; Bauan; Lobo; Mabini; San Luis; San Pascual; Tingloy
- Area: 399.14 km^{2} (154.11 sq mi)

Current constituency
- Created: 1907
- Representative: Gerville Luistro
- Political party: Lakas
- Congressional bloc: Majority

Batangas's 2nd congressional district is one of the six congressional districts of the Philippines in the province of Batangas. It has been represented in the House of Representatives of the Philippines since 1916 and earlier in the Philippine Assembly from 1907 to 1916. The district consists of the southern Batangas municipalities of Bauan, Lobo, Mabini, San Luis, San Pascual and Tingloy. It is currently represented in the 20th Congress by Gerville Luistro of Lakas-CMD.

Prior to its second dissolution in 1972, the second district encompassed the provincial capital city, Batangas City, and the southern Batangas municipalities of Alitagtag, Bauan, Cuenca, Ibaan, Lobo, Mabini, San Juan, San Pascual, Taysan, and Tingloy. Lobo and San Juan, previously from the third district, became part of the second district beginning in 1928, joining other municipalities (including the pre-cityhood Batangas) that were part of the district since its creation in 1907. Following the restoration of the Congress in 1987, it was reconfigured to encompass Batangas City and southern Batangas municipalities of Bauan, Lobo, Mabini, San Luis (previously from the first district), San Pascual and Tingloy. In 2015, Batangas City was separated from the district to gain its separate representation as the fifth district beginning in 2016.

== Representation history ==
#	Image	Member	Term of office		Legislature	Party	Electoral history	Constituent LGUs
#	Image	Member	Start	End	Legislature	Party	Electoral history	Constituent LGUs
=== Batangas's 2nd district for the Philippine Assembly ===
District created January 9, 1907.
1		Eusebio Orense	October 16, 1907	October 16, 1909	1st	Nacionalista	Elected in 1907.	1907–1909; Batangas, Bauan, Cuenca, Ibaan, San Luis
2		Florencio R. Caedo	October 16, 1909	October 16, 1912	2nd	Progresista	Elected in 1909.	1909–1916; Alitagtag, Batangas, Bauan, Cuenca, Ibaan, San Luis
3		Marcelo Caringal	October 16, 1912	October 16, 1916	3rd	Nacionalista	Elected in 1912.	1909–1916; Alitagtag, Batangas, Bauan, Cuenca, Ibaan, San Luis
=== Batangas's 2nd district for the House of Representatives of the Philippine Islands ===
4		Pablo Borbón	October 16, 1916	June 3, 1919	4th	Nacionalista	Elected in 1916.	1916–1919; Alitagtag, Batangas, Bauan, Cuenca, Ibaan, San Luis
5		Vicente Agregado	June 3, 1919	June 6, 1922	5th	Nacionalista	Elected in 1919.	1919–1928; Alitagtag, Batangas, Bauan, Cuenca, Ibaan, Mabini, San Luis
6		Rafael Villanueva	June 6, 1922	June 2, 1925	6th	Nacionalista; Unipersonalista	Elected in 1922.	1919–1928; Alitagtag, Batangas, Bauan, Cuenca, Ibaan, Mabini, San Luis
7		Andrés Buendía	June 2, 1925	June 5, 1928	7th	Nacionalista; Consolidado	Elected in 1925.	1919–1928; Alitagtag, Batangas, Bauan, Cuenca, Ibaan, Mabini, San Luis
8		Gavino S. Abaya	June 5, 1928	June 2, 1931	8th	Nacionalista; Consolidado	Elected in 1928.	1928–1935; Alitagtag, Batangas, Bauan, Cuenca, Ibaan, Lobo, Mabini, San Juan, Taysan
9		Meynardo M. Farol	June 2, 1931	June 5, 1934	9th	Nacionalista; Consolidado	Elected in 1931.	1928–1935; Alitagtag, Batangas, Bauan, Cuenca, Ibaan, Lobo, Mabini, San Juan, Taysan
10		Luís Francisco	June 5, 1934	September 16, 1935	10th	Nacionalista; Democrático	Elected in 1934.	1928–1935; Alitagtag, Batangas, Bauan, Cuenca, Ibaan, Lobo, Mabini, San Juan, Taysan
#	Image	Member	Term of office		National Assembly	Party	Electoral history	Constituent LGUs
#	Image	Member	Start	End	National Assembly	Party	Electoral history	Constituent LGUs
=== Batangas's 2nd district for the National Assembly (Commonwealth of the Philippines) ===
(1)		Eusebio Orense	September 16, 1935	December 30, 1941	1st	Nacionalista; Democrático	Elected in 1935.	1935–1941; Alitagtag, Batangas, Bauan, Cuenca, Ibaan, Lobo, Mabini, San Juan, Taysan
(1)		Eusebio Orense	September 16, 1935	December 30, 1941	2nd	Nacionalista	Re-elected in 1938.	1935–1941; Alitagtag, Batangas, Bauan, Cuenca, Ibaan, Lobo, Mabini, San Juan, Taysan
District dissolved into the two-seat Batangas's at-large district for the National Assembly (Second Philippine Republic).
#	Image	Member	Term of office		Common wealth Congress	Party	Electoral history	Constituent LGUs
#	Image	Member	Start	End	Common wealth Congress	Party	Electoral history	Constituent LGUs
=== Batangas's 2nd district for the House of Representatives of the Commonwealth of the Philippines ===
District re-created May 24, 1945.
(1)		Eusebio Orense	–	–	1st	Nacionalista	Re-elected in 1941. Died before start of term.	1945–1946; Alitagtag, Batangas, Bauan, Cuenca, Ibaan, Lobo, Mabini, San Juan, Taysan
#	Image	Member	Term of office		Congress	Party	Electoral history	Constituent LGUs
#	Image	Member	Start	End	Congress	Party	Electoral history	Constituent LGUs
=== Batangas's 2nd district for the House of Representatives of the Philippines ===
11		Pedro P. Muñoz	May 25, 1946	December 30, 1949	1st	Nacionalista	Elected in 1946.	1946–1957; Alitagtag, Batangas, Bauan, Cuenca, Ibaan, Lobo, Mabini, San Juan, Taysan
12		Numeriano U. Babao	December 30, 1949	December 30, 1961	2nd	Nacionalista	Elected in 1949.	1946–1957; Alitagtag, Batangas, Bauan, Cuenca, Ibaan, Lobo, Mabini, San Juan, Taysan
12		Numeriano U. Babao	December 30, 1949	December 30, 1961	3rd	Nacionalista	Re-elected in 1953.	1946–1957; Alitagtag, Batangas, Bauan, Cuenca, Ibaan, Lobo, Mabini, San Juan, Taysan
12		Numeriano U. Babao	December 30, 1949	December 30, 1961	4th	Nacionalista	Re-elected in 1957.	1957–1969; Alitagtag, Batangas, Bauan, Cuenca, Ibaan, Lobo, Mabini, San Juan, Taysan, Tingloy
13		Apolonio V. Marasigan	December 30, 1961	December 30, 1965	5th	Nacionalista	Elected in 1961.	1957–1969; Alitagtag, Batangas, Bauan, Cuenca, Ibaan, Lobo, Mabini, San Juan, Taysan, Tingloy
14		Olegario B. Cantos	December 30, 1965	December 30, 1969	6th	Liberal	Elected in 1965.	1957–1969; Alitagtag, Batangas, Bauan, Cuenca, Ibaan, Lobo, Mabini, San Juan, Taysan, Tingloy
15		Expedito Leviste	December 30, 1969	September 23, 1972	7th	Nacionalista	Elected in 1969. Removed from office after imposition of martial law.	1969–1972; Alitagtag, Batangas City, Bauan, Cuenca, Ibaan, Lobo, Mabini, San Juan, San Pascual, Taysan, Tingloy
District dissolved into the twenty-seat Region IV-A's at-large district for the Interim Batasang Pambansa, followed by the four-seat Batangas's at-large district for the Regular Batasang Pambansa.
District re-created February 2, 1987.
16		Hernando Perez	June 30, 1987	June 30, 1998	8th	LDP	Elected in 1987.	1987–2016; Batangas City, Bauan, Lobo, Mabini, San Luis, San Pascual, Tingloy
16		Hernando Perez	June 30, 1987	June 30, 1998	9th	LDP	Re-elected in 1992.	1987–2016; Batangas City, Bauan, Lobo, Mabini, San Luis, San Pascual, Tingloy
16		Hernando Perez	June 30, 1987	June 30, 1998	10th	Lakas	Re-elected in 1995.	1987–2016; Batangas City, Bauan, Lobo, Mabini, San Luis, San Pascual, Tingloy
17		Edgar L. Mendoza	June 30, 1998	June 30, 2001	11th	Lakas	Elected in 1998.	1987–2016; Batangas City, Bauan, Lobo, Mabini, San Luis, San Pascual, Tingloy
18		Francisco S. Perez II	June 30, 2001	June 30, 2004	12th	Lakas	Elected in 2001.	1987–2016; Batangas City, Bauan, Lobo, Mabini, San Luis, San Pascual, Tingloy
19		Hermilando Mandanas	June 30, 2004	June 30, 2013	13th	Liberal	Elected in 2004.	1987–2016; Batangas City, Bauan, Lobo, Mabini, San Luis, San Pascual, Tingloy
19		Hermilando Mandanas	June 30, 2004	June 30, 2013	14th	Liberal	Re-elected in 2007.	1987–2016; Batangas City, Bauan, Lobo, Mabini, San Luis, San Pascual, Tingloy
19		Hermilando Mandanas	June 30, 2004	June 30, 2013	15th	Liberal	Re-elected in 2010.	1987–2016; Batangas City, Bauan, Lobo, Mabini, San Luis, San Pascual, Tingloy
20		Raneo Abu	June 30, 2013	June 30, 2022	16th	Nacionalista	Elected in 2013.	1987–2016; Batangas City, Bauan, Lobo, Mabini, San Luis, San Pascual, Tingloy
20		Raneo Abu	June 30, 2013	June 30, 2022	17th	Nacionalista	Re-elected in 2016.	2016–present Bauan, Lobo, Mabini, San Luis, San Pascual, Tingloy
20		Raneo Abu	June 30, 2013	June 30, 2022	18th	Nacionalista	Re-elected in 2019.	2016–present Bauan, Lobo, Mabini, San Luis, San Pascual, Tingloy
21		Gerville R. Luistro	June 30, 2022	Incumbent	19th	NPC	Elected in 2022.	2016–present Bauan, Lobo, Mabini, San Luis, San Pascual, Tingloy
21		Gerville R. Luistro	June 30, 2022	Incumbent	19th	Lakas	Elected in 2022.	2016–present Bauan, Lobo, Mabini, San Luis, San Pascual, Tingloy
21		Gerville R. Luistro	June 30, 2022	Incumbent	20th	Lakas	Re-elected in 2025.	2016–present Bauan, Lobo, Mabini, San Luis, San Pascual, Tingloy

== Election results ==
=== 2025 ===
2025 Philippine House of Representatives elections
Party	Candidate	Votes	%
Lakas	Gerville Luistro	109,478	62.18%
Nacionalista	Raneo Abu	66,583	37.82%
Total votes		176,061	100.00%
Lakas hold			

=== 2022 ===
2022 Philippine House of Representatives elections
Party	Candidate	Votes	%
NPC	Gerville Luistro	71,832	43.21%
Nacionalista	Maria Reina Abu	68,208	41.03%
PDP–Laban	Nicasio Conti	26,193	15.76%
Total votes		166,233	100.00%
NPC gain from Nacionalista			

=== 2019 ===
2019 Philippine House of Representatives elections
Party	Candidate	Votes	%
Nacionalista	Raneo Abu	117,205	88.91
PDP–Laban	Nicasio Conti	14,610	11.08
Total votes		131,815	100.00
Nacionalista hold			

=== 2016 ===
2016 Philippine House of Representatives elections
Party	Candidate	Votes	%
Nacionalista	Raneo Abu	78,369	54.39
NUP	Nicasio Conti	52,733	36.60
Invalid or blank votes		12,974	9.01
Total votes		144,076	100.00
Nacionalista hold			

=== 2013 ===
2013 Philippine House of Representatives elections
Party	Candidate	Votes	%
Nacionalista	Raneo Abu	94,531	39.86
UNA	Danilo Berberabe	93,426	39.39
Liberal	Christopher De Leon	34,218	14.43
Margin of victory		1,105	0.47%
Invalid or blank votes		15,003	6.33
Total votes		237,178	100.00
Nacionalista gain from Liberal			

=== 2010 ===
2010 Philippine House of Representatives elections
Party	Candidate	Votes	%
Liberal	Hermilando Mandanas	155,516	63.32
Lakas–Kampi	Godofredo Berberabe	90,074	36.78
Valid ballots		245,590	92.76
Invalid or blank votes		11,147	4.34
Total votes		256,737	100.00
Liberal hold			

=== 2007 ===
2007 Philippine House of Representatives elections
Party	Candidate	Votes	%
Liberal	Hermilando Mandanas	149,362	77.51%
Lakas	Orestes Cabigao	22,481	11.67%
KAMPI	Edgar Mendoza	20,737	10.76%
Independent	Luis Gutierrez	131	0.07%
Total votes		192,711	100.00%
Liberal hold			

== See also ==
- Legislative districts of Batangas
