= Mabini, Batangas =

Municipality in Batangas, Philippines

Mabini
- Municipality
- Municipality of Mabini
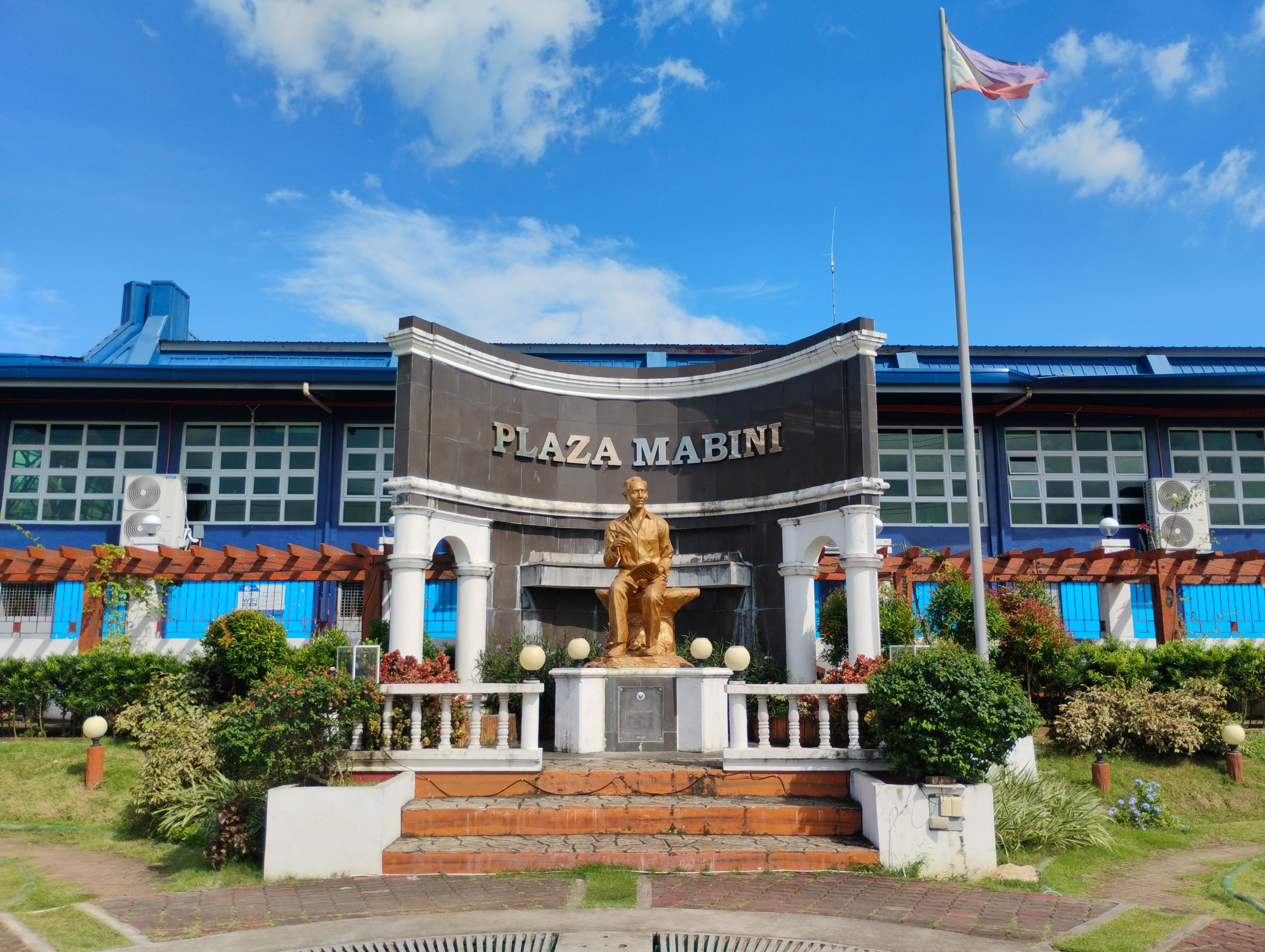
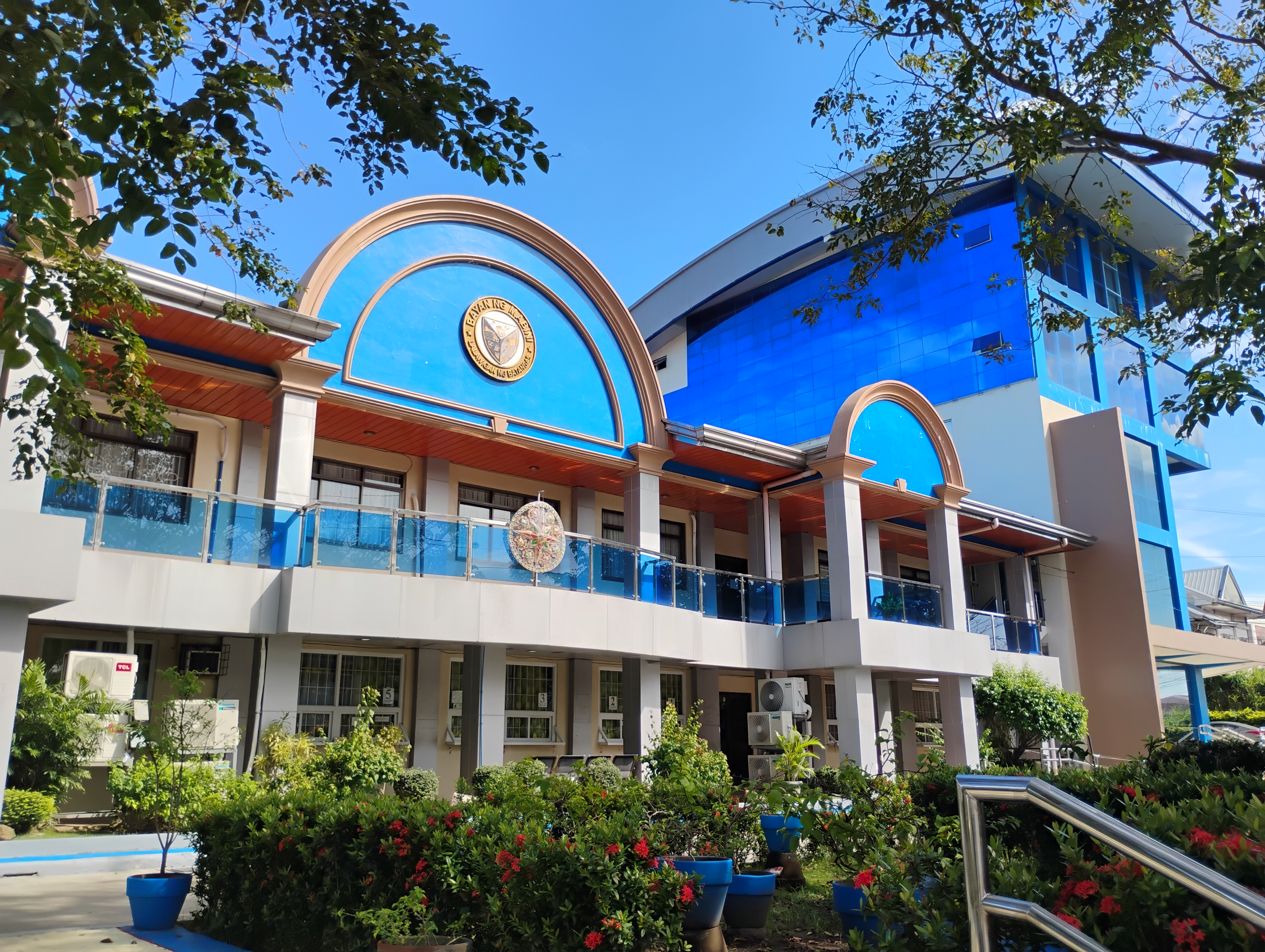
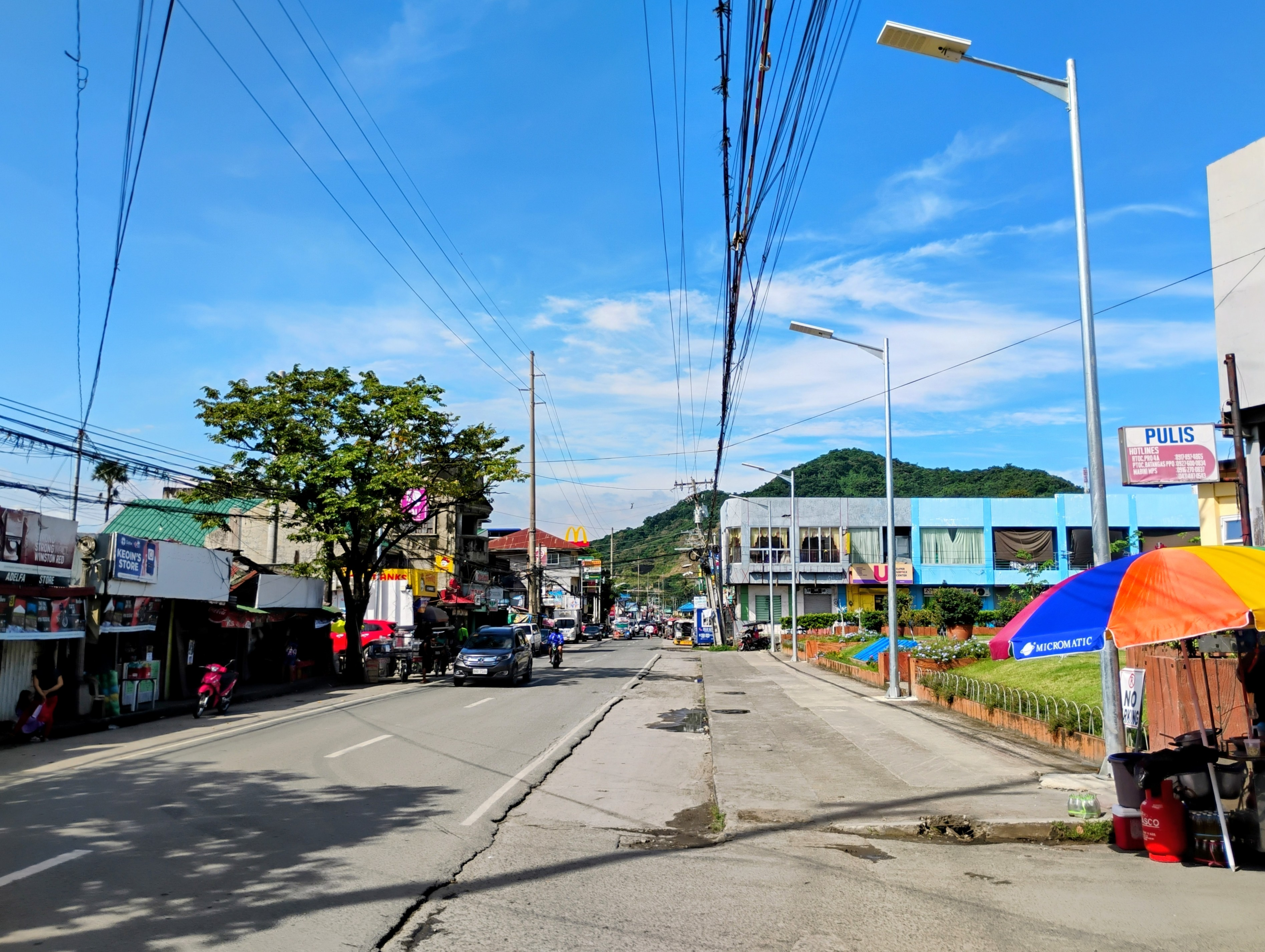
- Plaza Mabini Mabini Municipal Hall Mabini Town Proper

- Seal
- Nickname: Diving Capital of the Philippines
- Map of Batangas with Mabini highlighted
- Interactive map of Mabini
- Location within the Philippines
- Coordinates: 13°44′54″N 120°56′31″E
- Country: Philippines
- Region: Calabarzon
- Province: Batangas
- District: 2nd district
- Founded: January 1, 1918
- Named for: Apolinario Mabini
- Barangays: 34 (see Barangays)

Government
  - Type: Sangguniang Bayan
  - Mayor: Noel B. Luistro
  - Vice Mayor: Jose Nelson A. Hernandez
  - Representative: Gerville R. Luistro
  - Municipal Council: Members: Marysweet R. Magnaye; Catalino E. Arago; Victorino D. Bueno Jr.; Sonny M. de Leon; Pablo M. Villanueva Jr.; Alex Kenny A. Fabila; Marcelo A. Castillo; Teodulo D. Bueno
  - Electorate: 35,913 voters (2025)

Area
  - Total: 44.47 km^{2} (17.17 sq mi)
- Elevation: 53 m (174 ft)
- Highest elevation: 490 m (1,610 ft)
- Lowest elevation: 0 m (0 ft)

Population (2024 census)
  - Total: 49,876
  - Density: 1,122/km^{2} (2,905/sq mi)
  - Households: 11,725

Economy
  - Income class: 1st municipal income class
  - Poverty incidence: 8.51% (2023)
  - Revenue: ₱ 343.9 million (2024)
  - Assets: ₱ 1,011 million (2024)
  - Expenditure: ₱ 133.4 million (2024)
  - Liabilities: ₱ 127.4 million (2024)

Service provider
  - Electricity: Batangas 2 Electric Cooperative (BATELEC 2)
- Time zone: UTC+8 (PST)
- ZIP code: 4202
- PSGC: 0401016000
- IDD : area code: +63 (0)43
- Native languages: Tagalog

Mabini, officially the Municipality of Mabini (Tagalog: Bayan ng Mabini), is a municipality in the province of Batangas, Philippines. According to the 2024 census, it has a population of 49,876 people.

It is known for its world class diving and snorkeling sites.

== Etymology ==
The town is named after Apolinario Mabini, a Filipino revolutionary hero.

== History ==
=== Legendary origins ===
According to legend, the first Malay settlers to inhabit the vast fertile land bordering the two bodies of water now known as Batangas Bay and Balayan Bay first found anchor along the shores of the land protruding down southwestward, known as the Calumpan Peninsula.

The Malay settlers found the land fertile and agriculturally appropriate and the sea rich in marine resources, and they established their settlement in this once vast unknown land.

As more Malay settlers arrived from distant lands, more settlements were founded until even the upland regions of the peninsula were settled. The inhabitants had their own form of village government. They were ruled by a headman, a datu, or a sultan, in case of big settlements. Malay civilization began to take roots.

Rapid increase of population meant that it did not take long before several nearby regions were inhabited to comprise the whole province of Kumintang, better known later as Batangas.

=== Recorded history ===
During the Spanish colonial rule, the Calumpan Peninsula was made a part of the pueblo of Bauan, in the province of Kumintang. The same peninsula territory of Bauan was subdivided into barrios: Mainaga, Pulong-Niogan, Pulong-Balibaguhan, Anilao, Solo, Pulong-Anahao, Bagalangit, Nag-Iba, Malimatoc, Saguing and Talaga. For more than three hundred years, while the archipelago was under Spanish control, the peninsula remained a part of the “pueblo” of Bauan until the early part of the American occupation. The people of this peninsula, like other people of other regions, suffered untold hardships under the Spanish rule.

The Philippine Revolution of 1896 ended Spanish rule in the country, and in the Calumpan Peninsula the revolutionaries were led by Don Francisco Castillo, known as Apian Kiko.

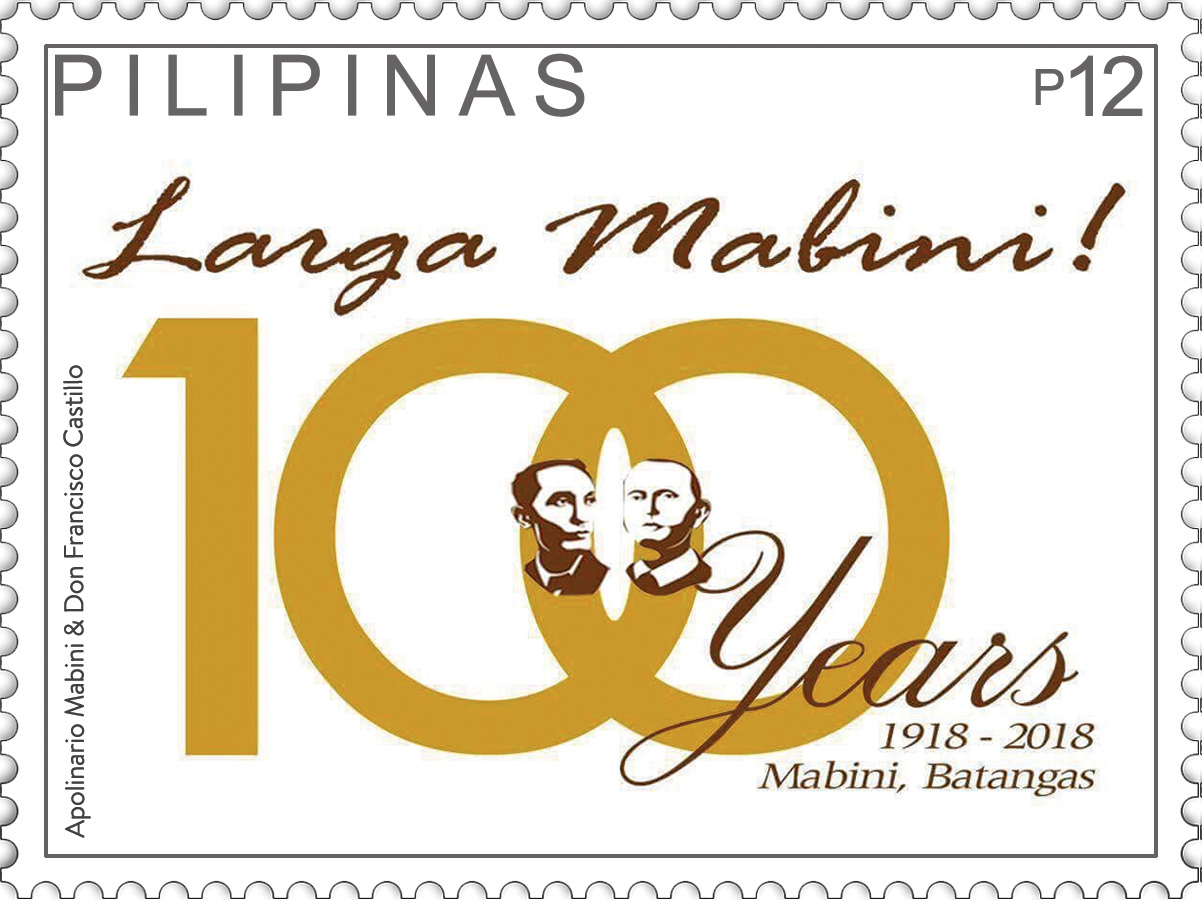
2018 stamp of the Philippines dedicated to the 100th anniversary of Mabini

Mabini, derived from the Philippine hero Apolinario Mabini, was founded when inhabitants of the region wanted a new municipality independent of the town of Bauan.

Eleven barrios of the Calumpan Peninsula and the whole of the Maricaban Island was declared this new, independent municipality.

The new municipality of Mabini was inaugurated on January 1, 1918, with Captain Francisco Castillo, known as the founder of the town, as the first appointed Municipal President.

Mabini suffered moderate damages after an earthquake swarm struck the municipality in April of 2017. It caused blackouts throughout the province and injuries to people. Mabini received an Intensity VII for both the magnitude 5.6 and 6.0 in April 8, 2017.

== Geography ==
According to the Philippine Statistics Authority, the municipality has a land area of 44.47 square kilometres (17.17 sq mi) constituting 1.43% of the 3,119.75-square-kilometre (1,204.54 sq mi) total area of Batangas.

Mabini is 18 kilometres (11 mi) from Batangas City and 123 kilometres (76 mi) from Manila.

=== Barangays ===
Mabini is politically subdivided into 34 barangays, as indicated in the matrix below. Each barangay consists of puroks and some have sitios.

PSGC	Barangay	Population			±% p.a.	
		2024		2010		
041016001	Anilao Proper	1.3%	650	611	▴	0.43%
041016002	Anilao East	3.3%	1,626	1,566	▴	0.26%
041016003	Bagalangit	4.9%	2,458	2,613	▾	−0.42%
041016004	Bulacan	2.7%	1,351	1,281	▴	0.37%
041016005	Calamias	2.3%	1,123	1,023	▴	0.65%
041016006	Estrella	1.4%	716	631	▴	0.88%
041016007	Gasang	4.9%	2,455	2,349	▴	0.31%
041016008	Laurel	2.4%	1,220	1,183	▴	0.21%
041016009	Ligaya	1.8%	889	1,205	▾	−2.09%
041016010	Mainaga	3.9%	1,951	1,735	▴	0.82%
041016011	Mainit	2.2%	1,076	1,050	▴	0.17%
041016012	Majuben	1.5%	725	640	▴	0.87%
041016014	Malimatoc I	1.9%	955	938	▴	0.13%
041016015	Malimatoc II	2.0%	999	1,141	▾	−0.92%
041016016	Nag‑Iba	1.8%	886	904	▾	−0.14%
041016017	Pilahan	1.5%	765	643	▴	1.22%
041016018	Poblacion	3.8%	1,911	1,472	▴	1.83%
041016019	Pulang Lupa	1.9%	969	1,220	▾	−1.59%
041016020	Pulong Anahao	2.5%	1,227	1,200	▴	0.15%
041016021	Pulong Balibaguhan	1.9%	940	887	▴	0.40%
041016022	Pulong Niogan	3.5%	1,755	1,268	▴	2.29%
041016023	Saguing	2.6%	1,302	1,313	▾	−0.06%
041016024	Sampaguita	3.3%	1,621	1,550	▴	0.31%
041016025	San Francisco	4.1%	2,052	1,762	▴	1.07%
041016026	San Jose	1.8%	876	865	▴	0.09%
041016027	San Juan	4.3%	2,124	1,975	▴	0.51%
041016028	San Teodoro	3.8%	1,913	1,783	▴	0.49%
041016029	Santa Ana	1.2%	585	712	▾	−1.36%
041016030	Santa Mesa	2.3%	1,126	1,193	▾	−0.40%
041016031	Santo Niño	1.4%	678	531	▴	1.72%
041016032	Santo Tomas	2.4%	1,210	1,136	▴	0.44%
041016033	Solo	5.5%	2,725	2,756	▾	−0.08%
041016034	Talaga Proper	3.3%	1,636	1,571	▴	0.28%
041016035	Talaga East	3.4%	1,716	1,684	▴	0.13%
	Total		49,876	44,391	▴	0.81%

Barangay San Juan was formerly the sitios of Nag-ilong and Lugay in the barrio of Mainaga, constituted into a separate and independent barangay through Republic Act No. 212, approved June 1, 1948.

=== Climate ===
Climate data for Mabini, Batangas
Month	Jan	Feb	Mar	Apr	May	Jun	Jul	Aug	Sep	Oct	Nov	Dec	Year
Mean daily maximum °C (°F)	28 (82)	30 (86)	31 (88)	33 (91)	32 (90)	30 (86)	29 (84)	29 (84)	29 (84)	29 (84)	29 (84)	29 (84)	30 (86)
Mean daily minimum °C (°F)	20 (68)	20 (68)	20 (68)	22 (72)	24 (75)	24 (75)	24 (75)	24 (75)	24 (75)	23 (73)	22 (72)	21 (70)	22 (72)
Average precipitation mm (inches)	11 (0.4)	13 (0.5)	14 (0.6)	32 (1.3)	101 (4.0)	142 (5.6)	208 (8.2)	187 (7.4)	175 (6.9)	131 (5.2)	68 (2.7)	39 (1.5)	1,121 (44.3)
Average rainy days	5.2	5.0	7.4	11.5	19.8	23.5	27.0	25.9	25.2	23.2	15.5	8.3	197.5
Source: Meteoblue

== Demographics ==
Population census of Mabini
Year	Pop.	±% p.a.
1918	11,925	—
1939	10,259	−0.71%
1948	11,850	+1.61%
1960	15,548	+2.29%
1970	19,522	+2.30%
1975	21,694	+2.14%
1980	23,637	+1.73%
1990	30,474	+2.57%
1995	33,499	+1.79%
2000	37,474	+2.43%
2007	40,629	+1.12%
2010	44,391	+3.28%
2015	46,211	+0.77%
2020	50,858	+2.04%
2024	49,876	−0.47%
Source: Philippine Statistics Authority

In the 2024 census, Mabini had a population of 49,876 people. The population density was 1,100 inhabitants per square kilometre (2,800/sq mi).

== Economy ==
Poverty incidence of Mabini

Source: Philippine Statistics Authority

== Transportation ==
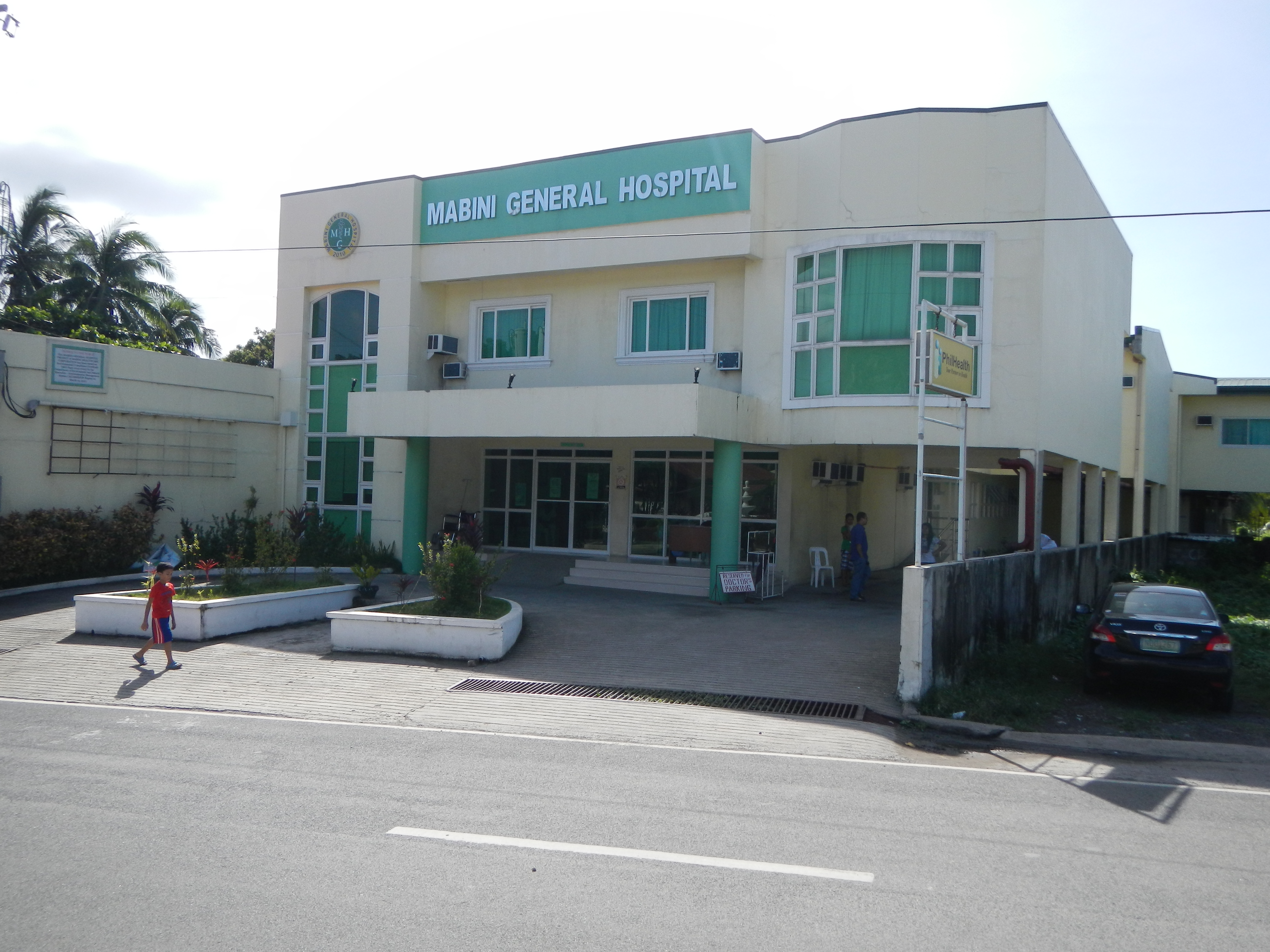
Mabini General Hospital

Jeepneys and tricycles are the main means of transportation around the town. Currently, there are two piers that serve the area: Anilao Pier and Talaga Pier, mainly catering for motor bancas going to and from the nearby island-town of Tingloy.

== Healthcare ==
- Mabini Community Hospital
- Zigzag Hospital
- Mabini Health Center

== Education ==
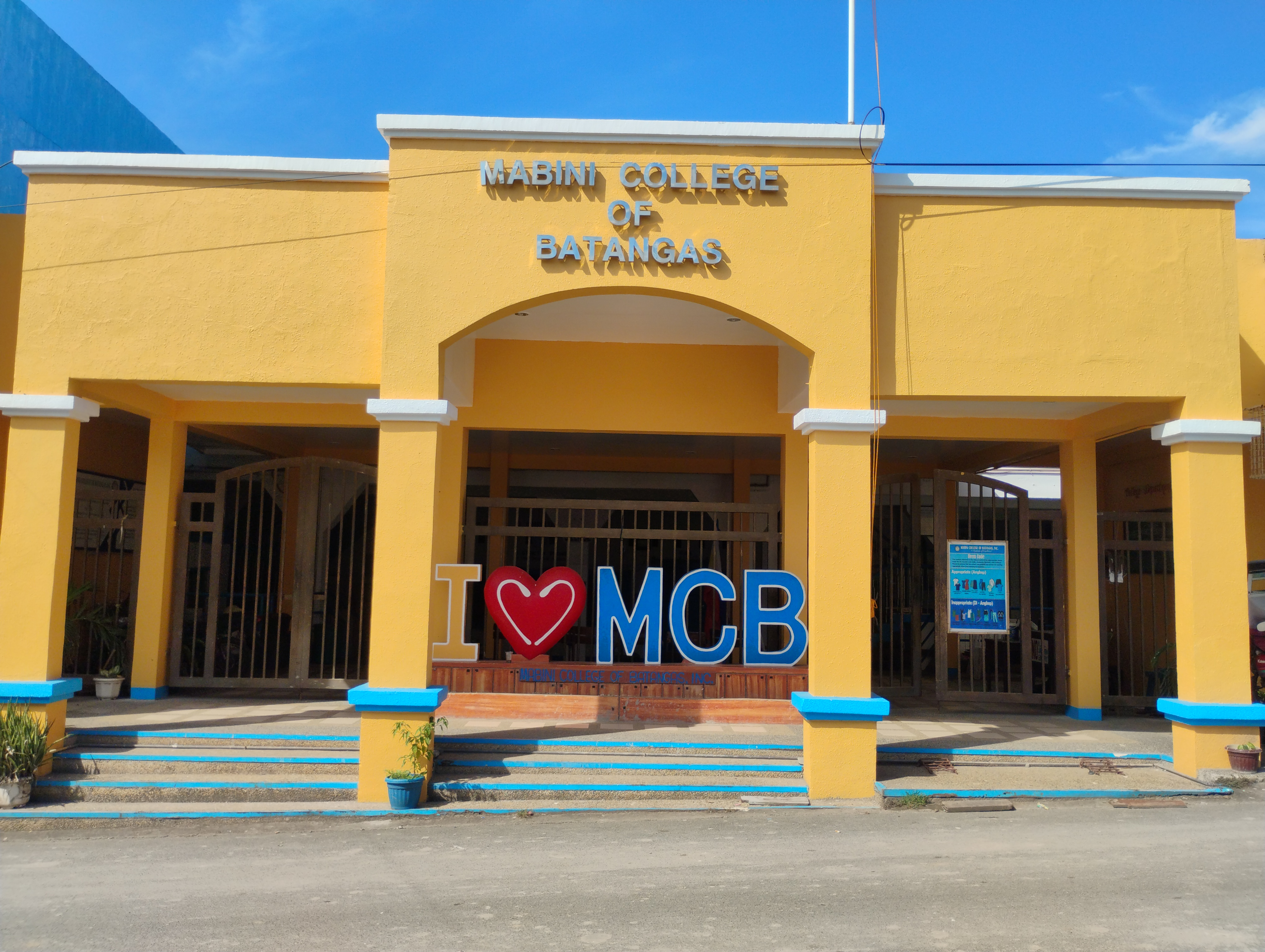
Mabini College of Batangas

The Mabini Schools District Office governs all educational institutions within the municipality. It oversees the management and operations of all private and public, from primary to secondary schools.

=== Primary and elementary schools ===
- Anilao Elementary School
- Bagalangit Elementary School
- Gasang Elementary School
- Jesus Flock Academy-Anilao
- Lady Fatima Montessori School
- Laurel Elementary School
- Ligaya Primary School
- Mabini Central School
- Mainaga-San Francisco Integrated School
- Mainit Elementary School
- Malimatoc Elementary School
- Nag-iba ELementary School
- P. Anahao Elementary School
- Panay Elementary School
- San Juan-Santo Niño Elementary School
- San Jose Elementary School
- San Teodoro Elementary School
- Santa Fe Integrated School
- Saint Francis Academy
- Solo Elementary School
- Sta. Mesa Elementary School
- St. Elizabeth School
- St. Lucresia's School
- Talaga Elementary School

=== Secondary schools ===
- Anselmo A. Sandoval Memorial National High School
- Apolinario Mabini National High School
- Mabini College of Batangas (High School)
- Mabini National High School
- Saint Francis Academy
- Santa Fe Integrated School

=== Higher educational institutions ===
- Mabini College of Batangas
- Batangas State University - Mabini Campus

== Tourism ==
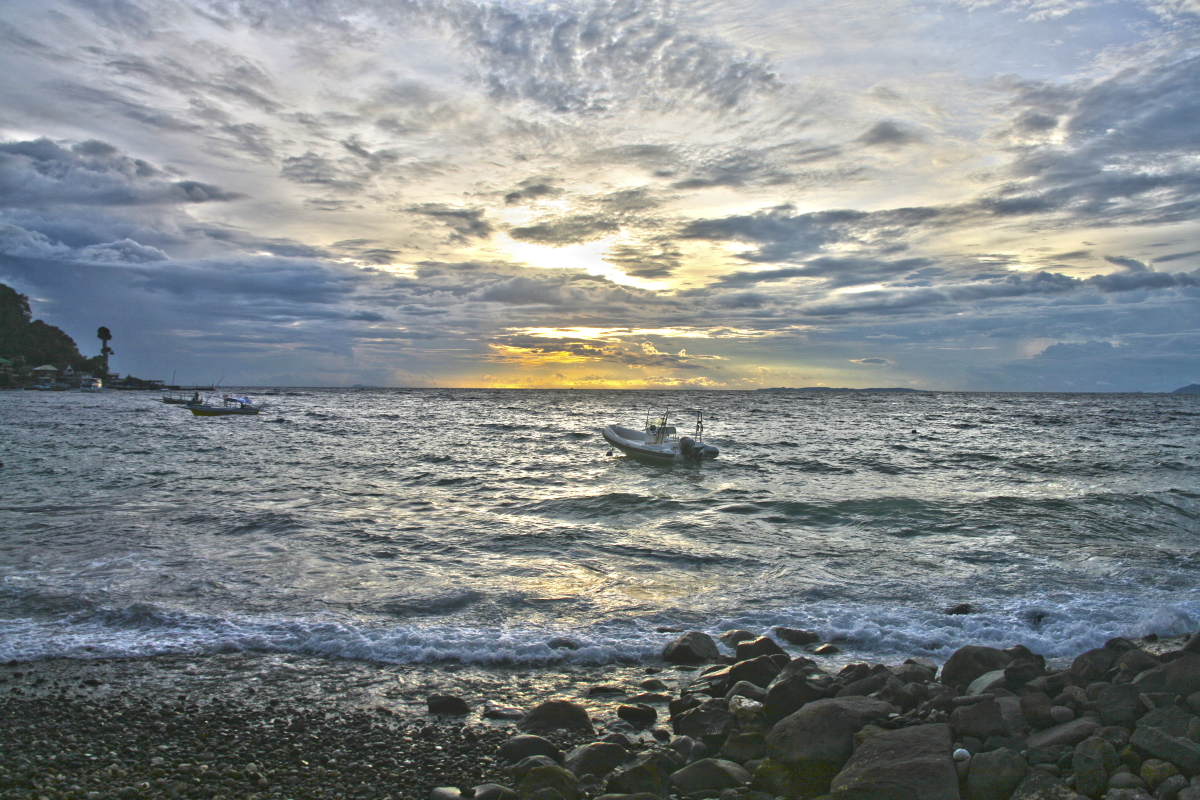
Sunset in Anilao

- Anilao – popular with budget divers and snorkelers. There are several diving centers where trips can be arranged to diving spots in Balayan Bay near Cape Bagalangit and near Sombrero and Maricaban Islands. Snorkeling is available off Maricaban's Cemetery Beach, Red Palm Beach, and around Sepok Point. Although the beach at Anilao is not recommended for swimming due to its rocky nature (as opposed to sand), thatched bamboo rafts can be rented with tables and benches at some resorts.
- Mount Gulugod-Baboy – the hills traversing Calumpang Peninsula. It has three peaks: Gulugod Baboy, Pinagbanderahan, and Tore, accessible through several passages: Anilao, Panay, Bagalangit, Ligaya, Laurel and Malimatoc I. It is 525 metres (1,722 ft) above sea level. At its peak, one can see, from east to west: Janao Bay, Maricaban Strait which bears Sombrero and Maricaban Islands, a distant, faint blue Mindoro, Verde Island (SW) and Batangas Bay. Batangas City and its port is visible on the west, following a farther Mount Daguldul. To the north is Mount Macolod, and even Mount Batulao and the Tagaytay highlands. It is popular among hikers during Holy Week.

== Gallery ==
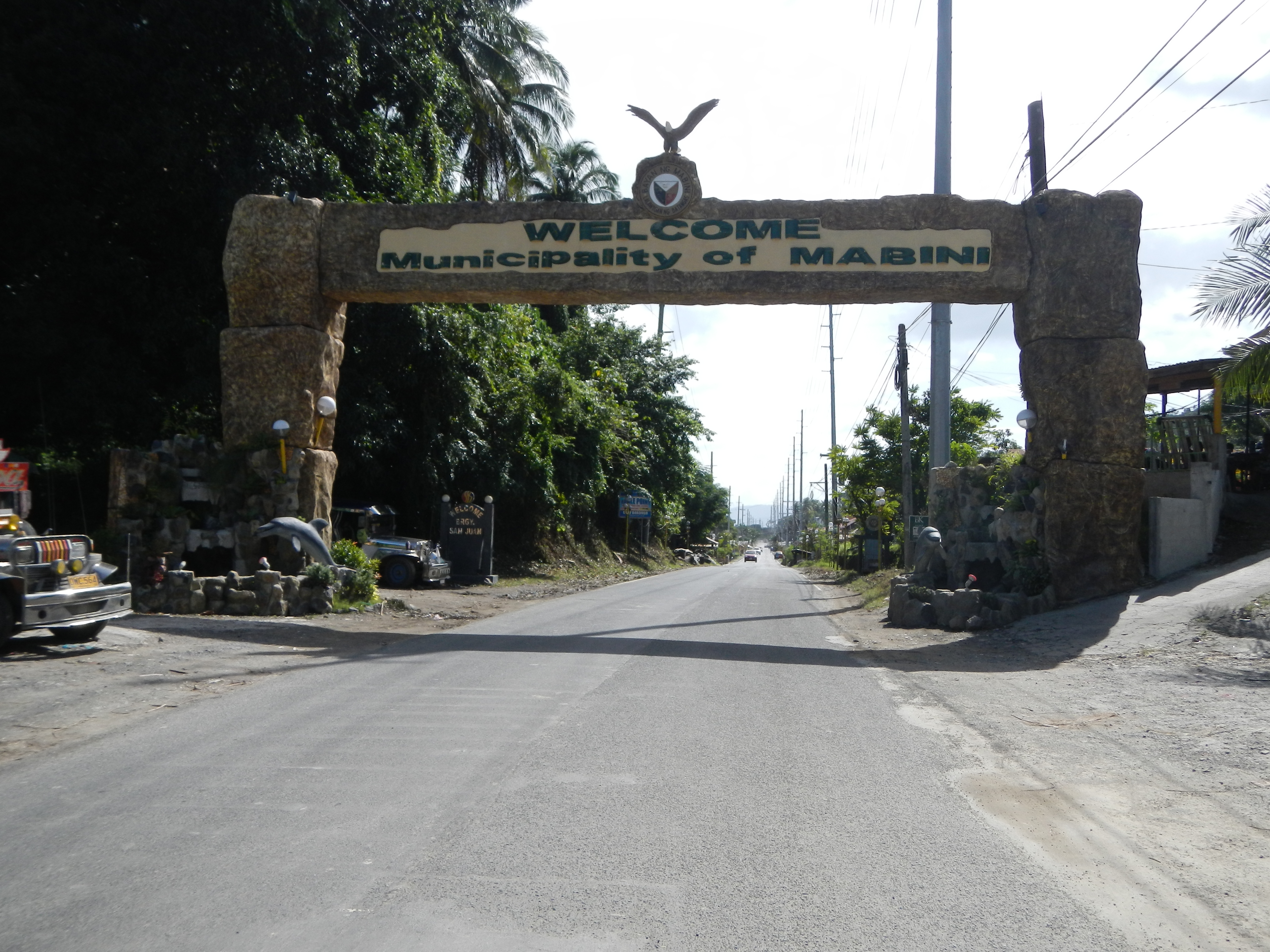
Welcome arch at Bauan

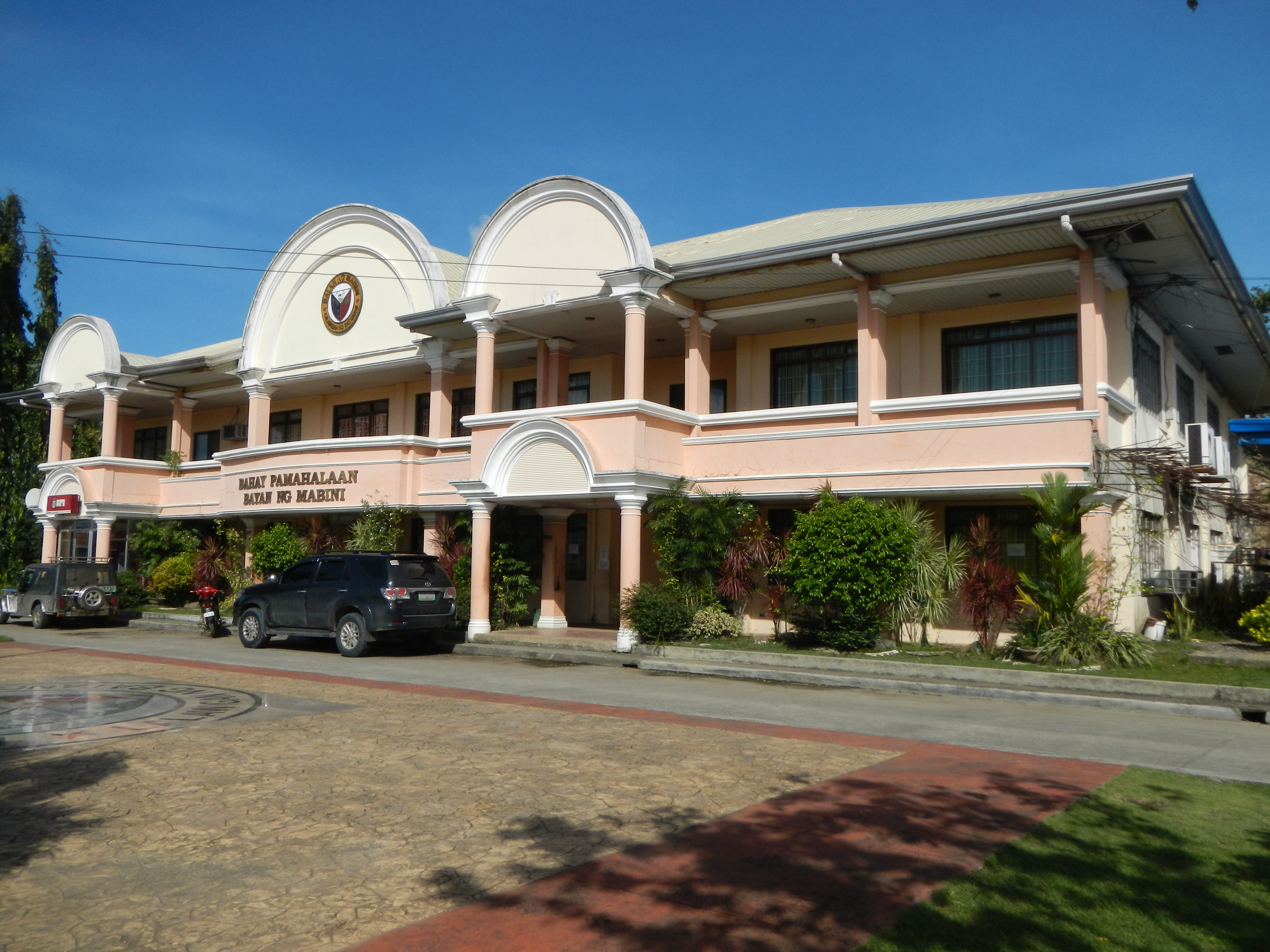
Municipal Hall

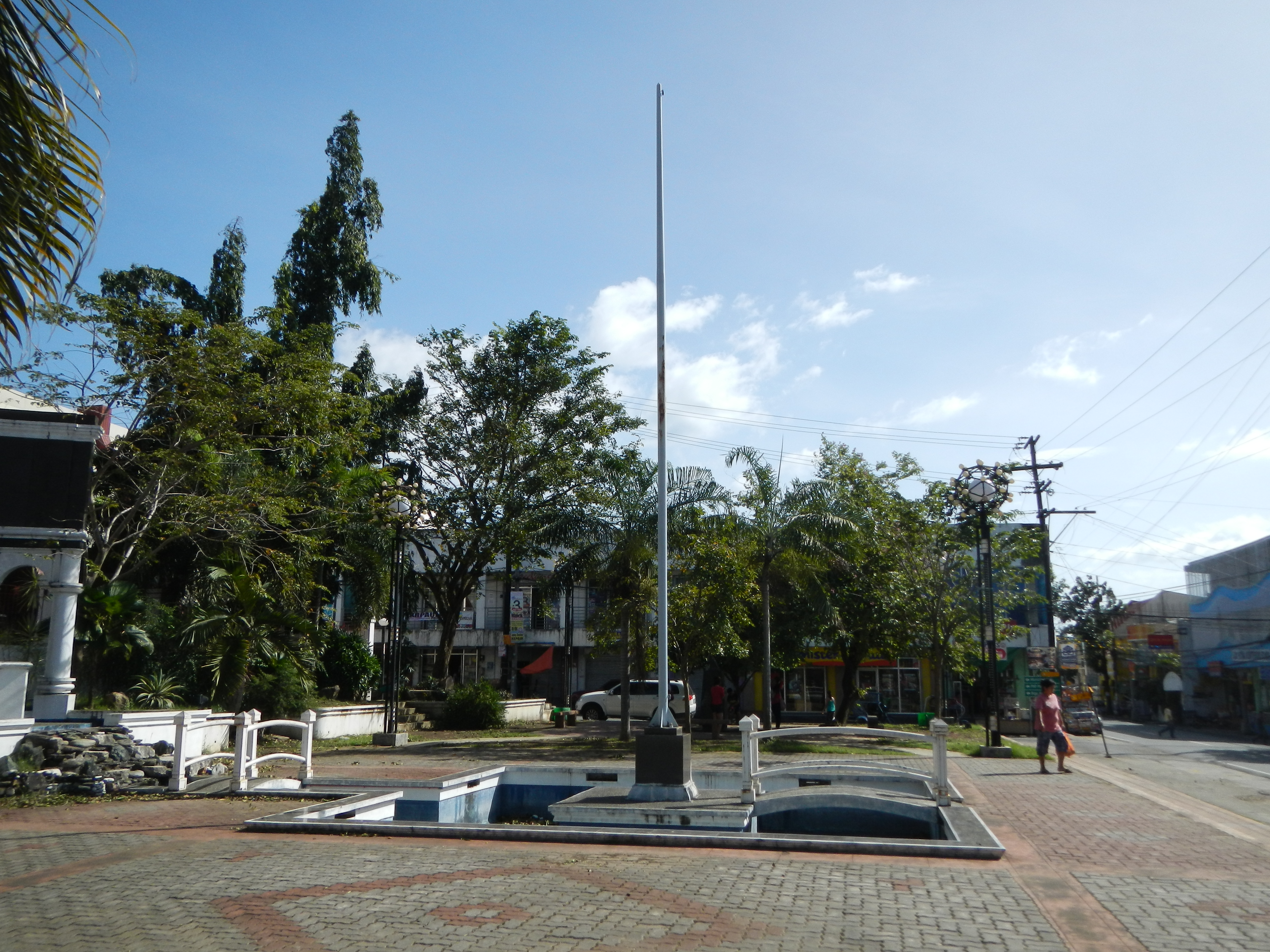
Plaza Mabini

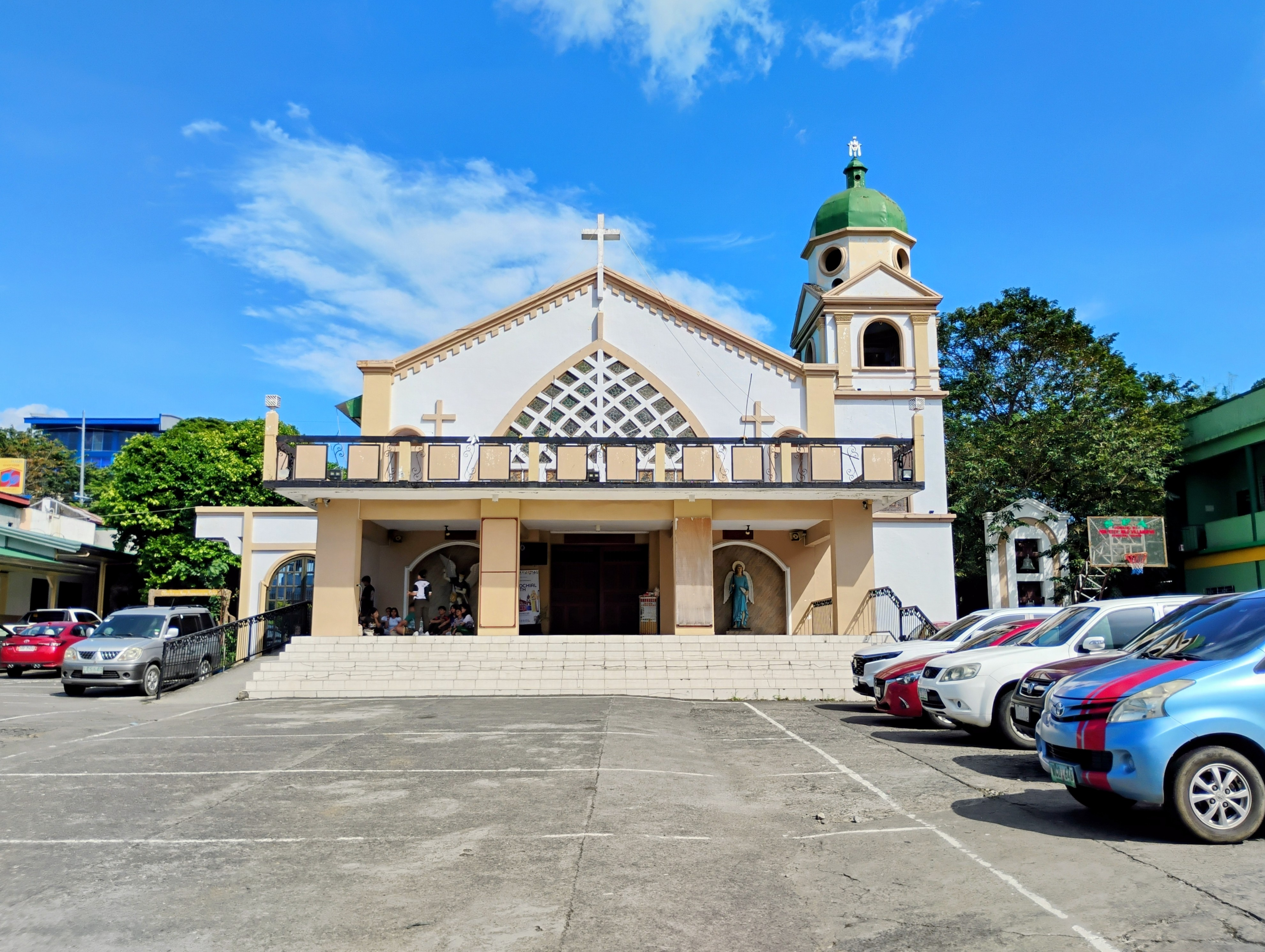
Saint Francis of Paola Parish Church
