= Tingloy =

Municipality in Batangas, Philippines

- Municipality
- Municipality of Tingloy
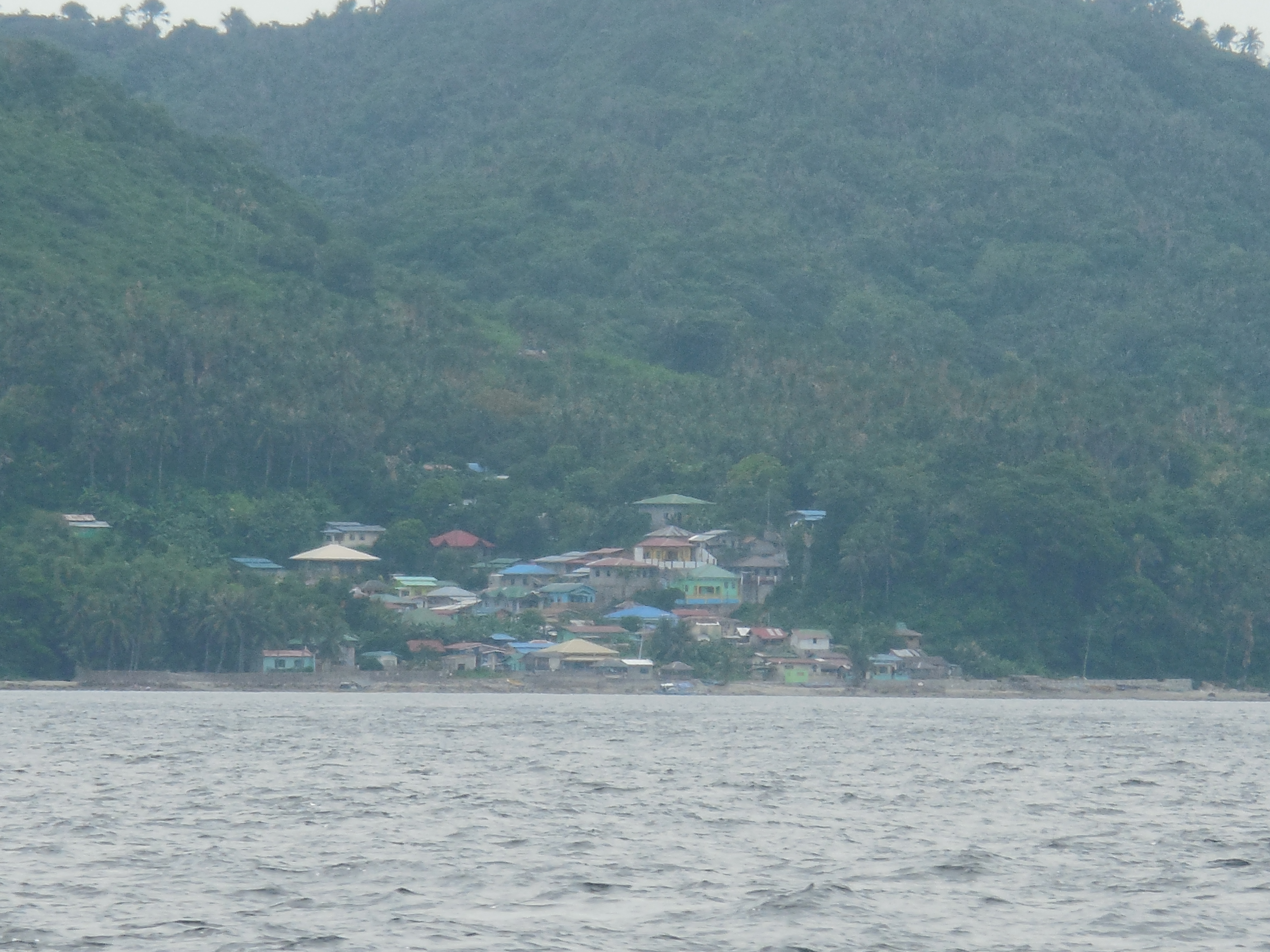
- A fishing village in Tingloy

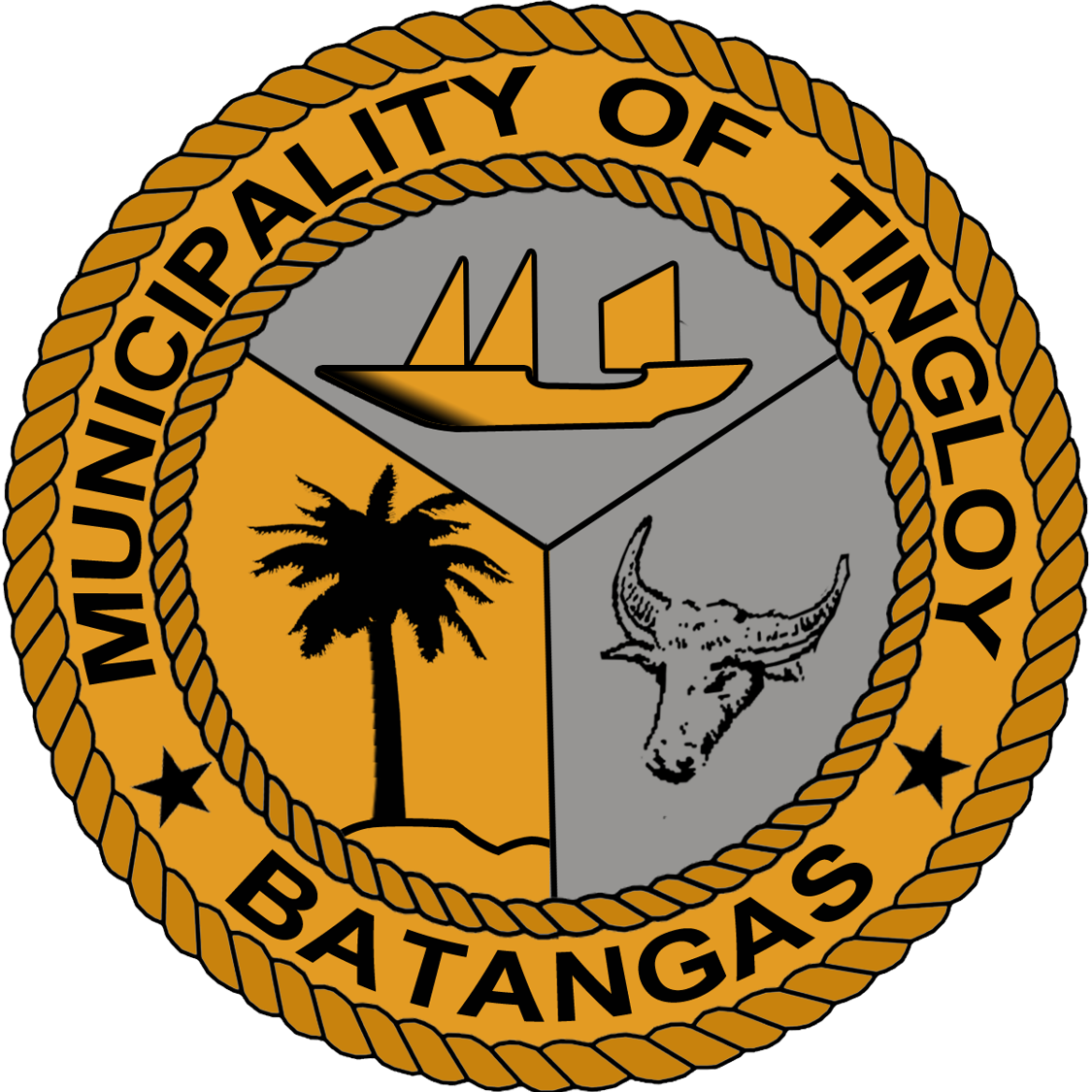
- Seal

- Map of Batangas with Tingloy highlighted
- Interactive map of Tingloy
- Location within the Philippines
- Coordinates: 13°39′N 120°52′E
- Country: Philippines
- Region: Calabarzon
- Province: Batangas
- District: 2nd district
- Founded: June 17, 1955
- Barangays: 15 (see Barangays)

Government
  - Type: Sangguniang Bayan
  - Mayor: Lauro F. Alvarez
  - Vice Mayor: Dawn Erika E. Alvarez
  - Representative: Gerville R. Luistro
  - Municipal Council: Members: Romeo M. Macarandang; Raymundo H. Atienza; Marinel R. de Chavez; Andres D. Manalo; Danilo R. Datingaling; Ryan R. Navarro; Victoria M. Nubla; Camelo D. de Ade
  - Electorate: 11,385 voters (2025)

Area
  - Total: 33.07 km^{2} (12.77 sq mi)
- Elevation: 16 m (52 ft)
- Highest elevation: 487 m (1,598 ft)
- Lowest elevation: 0 m (0 ft)

Population (2024 census)
  - Total: 15,866
  - Density: 479.8/km^{2} (1,243/sq mi)
  - Households: 5,103

Economy
  - Income class: 4th municipal income class
  - Poverty incidence: 13.91% (2023)
  - Revenue: ₱ 119.6 million (2024)
  - Assets: ₱ 380.7 million (2024)
  - Expenditure: ₱ 39.78 million (2024)
  - Liabilities: ₱ 121.9 million (2024)

Service provider
  - Electricity: Batangas 2 Electric Cooperative (BATELEC 2)
- Time zone: UTC+8 (PST)
- ZIP code: 4203
- PSGC: 0401033000
- IDD : area code: +63 (0)43
- Native languages: Tagalog

Tingloy, officially the Municipality of Tingloy (Tagalog: Bayan ng Tingloy), is a municipality in the province of Batangas, Philippines. According to the 2024 census, it has a population of 15,866 people, making it the least populated municipality in the province.

== Etymology ==
The name "Tingloy" was, according to legend, derived from a plant of almost the same name, "tinghoy", which is largely found in abundance on the island up to now.

== History ==
The first people to inhabit the island almost a century ago came from Taal and Bauan, presumably to escape the brutalities perpetrated by the Spanish "conquistadors". They came in family groups and finding the place a haven, settled down in definite areas later forming the various barrios now comprising the created political subdivision. It is said that the former barrio of Tingloy was founded by Jose Martinez, a Taaleño.

At several times the island was placed under the jurisdiction of different towns. The island was originally part of the town of San Luis. In 1917, it was placed under the jurisdiction of Bauan, only to be separated from it a year later when the municipality of Mabini was formed. In 1921, it was again placed under the jurisdiction of Bauan.

During the Spanish regime, people were educated at home learning to read the "Cartillas" and the "Caton" "Christiana". During American occupation schools were established. Ireneo Martinez together with Flaviano Gamben, initiated a movement for a model schoolhouse for the former barrio of Tingloy. This movement became a success when a model schoolhouse was constructed in the present poblacion of the Municipality of Tingloy sometime in 1921.

During the second regular session of the 3rd Congress of the Philippines, the barrios of Tingloy, Maricaban, Papaya, Pisa, Gamao, and Talahib were separated from Bauan and constituted into the newly created municipality of Tingloy. President Ramon Magsaysay, on June 17, 1955, appointed the first municipal officials headed by Ramon De Claro as mayor.

== Geography ==
According to the Philippine Statistics Authority, the municipality has a land area of 33.07 square kilometres (12.77 sq mi) constituting 1.06% of the 3,119.75-square-kilometre- (1,204.54 sq mi) total area of Batangas.

Just off the southwest coast of the Batangas mainland, about two nautical miles (3.7 kilometres) south, lies the radish-shaped island of Maricaban. It has a land area of about 14 square miles (36 square kilometres) of rugged hills and sloping mountains with occasional lowland plains and valleys. The municipality comprises the entire Maricaban Island, Caban Island, and other minor islets, all just south of the Calumpang Peninsula. Visitors to its beaches and diving facilities are a source of income.

=== Barangays ===
Tingloy is politically subdivided into 15 barangays, as shown in the matrix below. Each barangay consists of puroks and some have sitios.

PSGC	Barangay	Population			±% p.a.	
		2024		2010		
041033001	Corona	5.4%	861	870	▾	−0.07%
041033003	Gamao	6.7%	1,062	1,039	▴	0.15%
041033004	Makawayan	6.2%	977	982	▾	−0.04%
041033005	Marikaban	7.7%	1,221	1,112	▴	0.65%
041033006	Papaya	11.0%	1,747	1,732	▴	0.06%
041033007	Pisa	7.4%	1,181	965	▴	1.41%
041033008	Barangay 13 (Poblacion 1)	5.5%	876	794	▴	0.68%
041033009	Barangay 14 (Poblacion 2)	5.6%	886	812	▴	0.61%
041033010	Barangay 15 (Poblacion 3)	5.5%	867	722	▴	1.28%
041033011	San Isidro	10.6%	1,686	1,459	▴	1.01%
041033012	San Jose	9.0%	1,428	1,197	▴	1.23%
041033013	San Juan	12.1%	1,916	1,821	▴	0.35%
041033014	San Pedro	3.0%	477	527	▾	−0.69%
041033015	Santo Tomas	10.5%	1,673	1,677	▾	−0.02%
041033016	Talahib	6.7%	1,061	1,161	▾	−0.62%
	Total		15,866	16,870	▾	−0.42%

=== Climate ===
Climate data for Tingloy, Batangas
Month	Jan	Feb	Mar	Apr	May	Jun	Jul	Aug	Sep	Oct	Nov	Dec	Year
Mean daily maximum °C (°F)	28 (82)	29 (84)	30 (86)	31 (88)	31 (88)	30 (86)	29 (84)	29 (84)	29 (84)	29 (84)	29 (84)	28 (82)	29 (85)
Mean daily minimum °C (°F)	22 (72)	21 (70)	22 (72)	23 (73)	25 (77)	25 (77)	25 (77)	25 (77)	25 (77)	24 (75)	23 (73)	22 (72)	24 (74)
Average precipitation mm (inches)	48 (1.9)	32 (1.3)	41 (1.6)	54 (2.1)	257 (10.1)	410 (16.1)	466 (18.3)	422 (16.6)	429 (16.9)	300 (11.8)	137 (5.4)	92 (3.6)	2,688 (105.7)
Average rainy days	10.8	8.0	9.8	11.7	23.1	27.5	29.2	28.7	28.7	25.5	18.2	12.8	234
Source: Meteoblue

== Demographics ==
Population census of Tingloy
Year	Pop.	±% p.a.
1960	7,656	—
1970	10,636	+3.34%
1975	11,963	+2.39%
1980	13,381	+2.26%
1990	15,430	+1.44%
1995	14,897	−0.66%
2000	17,028	+2.91%
2007	18,548	+1.19%
2010	16,870	−3.39%
2015	17,919	+1.16%
2020	19,215	+1.48%
2024	15,866	−4.49%
Source: Philippine Statistics Authority

In the 2024 census, Tingloy had a population of 15,866 people. The population density was 480 inhabitants per square kilometre (1,200/sq mi).

== Economy ==
Poverty incidence of Tingloy (%)

Source: Philippine Statistics Authority

== Attractions ==
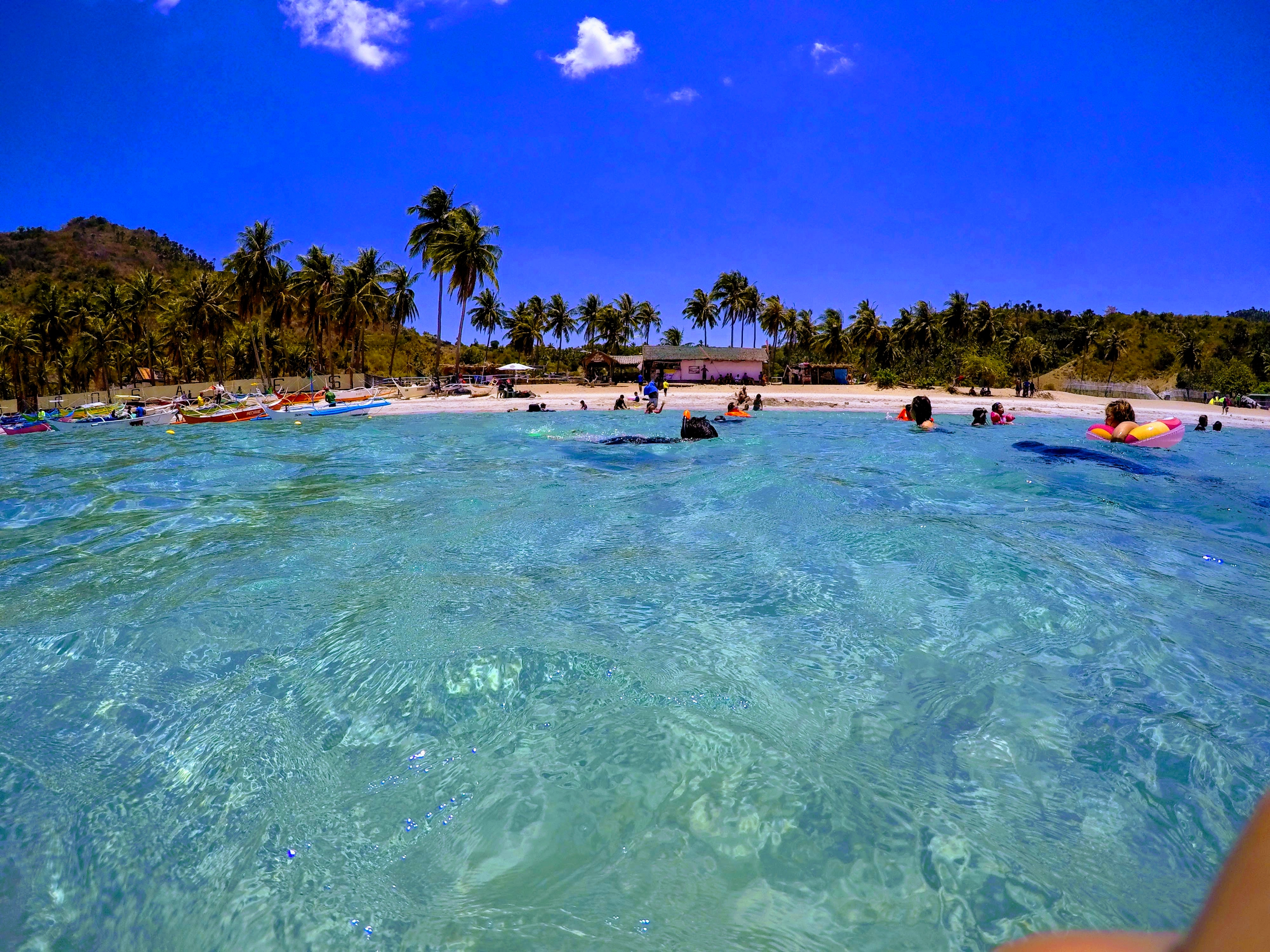
Masasa Beach

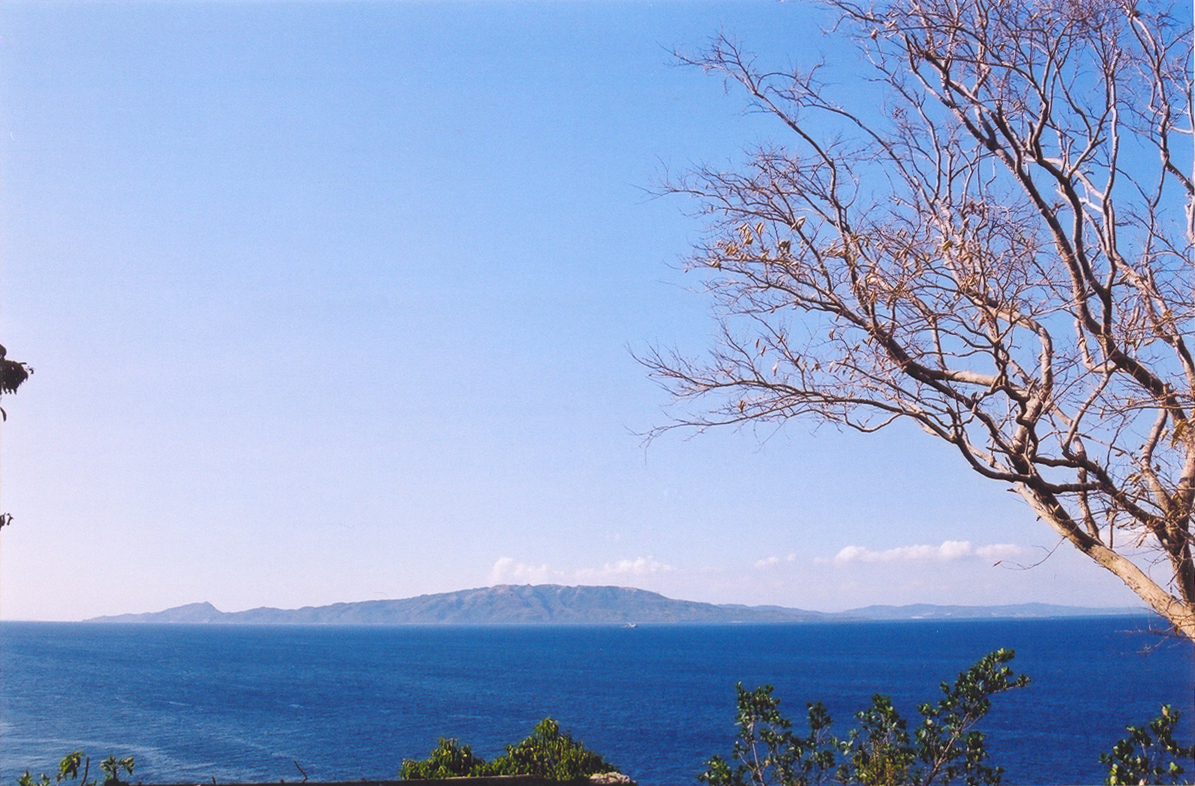
A view from Sabang on the island of Mindoro in the Philippines towards Maricaban Island.

- Masasa Beach (Barangay San Juan) is one of the most visited beaches of the place, and is known for its white sand and beautiful sunset. It is located on the other side of the island which is accessible by walking or tricycle.
- Mag-Asawang Bato is one of the two peaks of the island, and this is the most visited peak by mountaineers and nature enthusiasts, where a 360° view of the whole island can be seen.
- Isla Sombrero (Sombrero Island) is a small uninhabited island located at the eastern tip of Maricaban. It is accessible through a medium-sized motor-boat or banka, and is one of the most visited beach attractions in the island.
- Batalang-Bato (Pulang Buli) is a fish sanctuary between Barangay Santo Tomas and Barangay Talahib. For research diving and snorkeling, permission is needed from the BBMC and the barangay councils of Santo Tomas and Talahib.
- Caban Island is also considered one of the tourist spots because of its white sand and scattered beaches surrounding the island.One of these are Mapating Beach, Layag Layag Point, Caban Island Beach, Fortales Beach and Bahay Kambing.
- Diving is one of the major activities in the town because of its different diving spots.

== Education ==
The Tingloy Schools District Office governs all educational institutions within the municipality. It oversees the management and operations of all private and public, from primary to secondary schools.

=== Primary and elementary schools ===
- Bago Primary School
- Banalo Elementary School
- Corona Elementary School
- Gamaw Elementary School
- Makawayan Elementary School
- Marikaban Elementary School
- Papaya Elementary School
- Pisa Elementary School
- San Jose Elementary School
- San Juan Elementary School
- San Pedro Elementary School
- Sto. Tomas Elementary School
- Talahib Elementary School
- Tingloy Central School

=== Secondary schools ===
- Papaya National High School
- Tingloy National High School
- Tingloy Senior High School
- Lyceum of Tingloy de San Roque Inc.
