= Gerville Luistro =

Filipino politician and lawyer (born 1975)

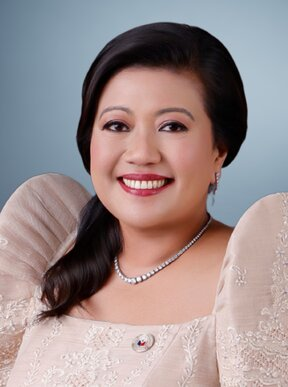
- Official portrait, 2026

Member of the Philippine House of Representatives from Batangas's 2nd congressional district
- Incumbent
- Assumed office June 30, 2022
- Preceded by: Raneo Abu

Chairperson of the House Committee on Justice
- Incumbent
- Assumed office July 30, 2025
- Preceded by: Juliet Marie Ferrer

Personal details
- Born: Gerville Abanilla Reyes; October 3, 1975 (age 51) Mabini, Batangas, Philippines
- Party: Lakas (2022–present)
- Other political affiliations: NPC (2021–2022)
- Spouse: Noel Luistro
- Education: University of Batangas (JD)
- Occupation: Politician
- Profession: Lawyer

Gerville Abanilla "Jinky Bitrics" Reyes-Luistro (born October 3, 1975) is a Filipino lawyer and politician who has served as the representative of Batangas's second district since 2022.

A graduate of the University of Batangas, Luistro held a number of roles at the Department of Justice before becoming the municipal administrator of Mabini, Batangas. In the 2022 elections, she was elected for her first term in Congress and was later re-elected in 2025.

During her tenure, she drew national attention for her role as the chairperson of the Philippine House Committee on Justice in the first and second impeachment proceedings against Vice President Sara Duterte.

== Early life and career ==
Luistro was born on October 3, 1975, in Mabini, Batangas, Philippines. Luistro completed her undergraduate studies in liberal arts-commerce at the University of Batangas (UB) and she pursued a law degree at the same institution. She passed the Bar Examinations in 2002.

While studying law at UB, Luistro was a full-time professor at Lyceum of Batangas and was executive assistant to Hernando Perez, then justice secretary and UB president. After passing the Bar exam, Luistro worked as a confidential agent for the Bureau of Immigration and served as a consultant for the Department of Justice’s Witness Protection Program. She eventually became a State Counsel, where she was tasked with handling various legal cases for the government.

Luistro's role in handling high-profile cases led to her appointment as head of the investigation team of the Special Presidential Task Force during the Arroyo administration. She oversaw investigations into the tax credit scam.

Luistro was appointed as the municipal administrator of Mabini, Batangas, by its then-mayor Rowell Sandoval. She continued holding the position during the mayoralty of her husband Noel Luistro.

== House of Representatives (2022–present) ==
=== Elections ===
In 2022, Luistro ran for representative of the Batangas's second district under the Nationalist People's Coalition and won. She defeated the daughter of outgoing representative Raneo Abu, Reina Abu of Nacionalista Party and Nicasio "Nick" Conti of the PDP-Laban. She switched party from Nationalist People's Coalition to Lakas–CMD before the start of the 19th Congress.

She ran again for congresswoman in the May 2025 election and defeated Raneo Abu.

=== Tenure ===
Luistro was a member of the Quad Committee which organized a House inquiry on the war on drugs of former President Rodrigo Duterte and the alleged link of dismissed Bamban mayor Alice Guo to alleged illicit activities of Philippine offshore gaming operators in 2024. Following the successful impeachment of Vice President Sara Duterte in February 2025, Luistro was named as part of the prosecution team for the aborted Senate impeachment trial.

As the House committee on justice chairperson, Luistro oversaw the proceedings for the 2026 impeachment attempts against Vice President Sara Duterte. She will serve as House Prosecutor in the impeachment trial on May 18, 2026.

== Personal life ==
Gerville Luistro is married to Noel Luistro, the former mayor of Mabini.

== Electoral history ==
Electoral history of Gerville Luistro
Year	Office	Party	Votes received				Result
Year	Office	Party	Total	%	P.	Swing	Result
2022	Representative (Batangas–2nd)	NPC	71,832	43.21%	1st	—N/a	Won
2025	Representative (Batangas–2nd)	Lakas	109,478	62.18%	1st	+18.97	Won

House of Representatives of the Philippines
Preceded by Raneo Abu	Member of the House of Representatives from Batangas's 2nd district 2022-present	Incumbent
