= 2013 Philippine House of Representatives elections in Calabarzon =

Elections were held in Calabarzon for seats in the House of Representatives of the Philippines on May 13, 2013.

The candidate with the most votes won that district's seat for the 16th Congress of the Philippines.

== Summary ==
Party	Popular vote	%	Swing	Seats won	Change
Liberal				10	
NPC				5	
Lakas				3	
NUP				3	
Nacionalista				1	
UNA				1	
Aksyon				0	
LM				0	
PDP–Laban				0	
PMP				0	
Independent				0	
Valid votes				23	
Invalid votes					
Turnout					
Registered voters					

== Antipolo ==
=== 1st District ===
Roberto Puno is the incumbent.

2013 Philippine House of Representatives election at Antipolo's 1st district
Party	Candidate	Votes	%
NUP	Roberto Puno	73,944	67.34
Independent	Francisco Sumulong, Jr.	18,058	16.44
Independent	Dioscoro Esteban, Jr.	2,822	2.57
Independent	Florante Quizon	1,379	1.26
Independent	Raldy Abano	741	0.67
Margin of victory		55,886	50.90%
Invalid or blank votes		12,856	11.71
Total votes		109,800	100.00
NUP hold			

=== 2nd District ===
Romeo Acop is the incumbent.

2013 Philippine House of Representatives election at Antipolo's 2nd district
Party	Candidate	Votes	%
Liberal	Romeo Acop	64,798	56.35
PDP–Laban	Lorenzo Sumulong III	38,773	33.72
Independent	Silverio Bulanon	1,024	0.89
Margin of victory		26,025	22.63%
Invalid or blank votes		10,397	9.04
Total votes		114,992	100.00
Liberal hold			

== Batangas ==
=== 1st District ===
Tomas Apacible is the incumbent. His primary opponent is former Representative Eileen Ermita-Buhain

2013 Philippine House of Representatives election at Batangas' 1st district
Party	Candidate	Votes	%
Lakas	Eileen Ermita-Buhain	103,571	45.61
Liberal	Tomas Apacible	98,252	43.27
Independent	Luisito Ruiz	2,640	1.16
Independent	Reynaldo Albajera	1,444	0.64
Margin of victory		5,319	2.34%
Invalid or blank votes		21,178	9.33
Total votes		227,085	100.00
Lakas gain from Liberal			

=== 2nd District ===
Incumbent Hermilando Mandanas, who had earlier resigned from the Liberal Party is term limited. The Liberals nominated actor and incumbent board member Christopher de Leon, with the United Nationalist Alliance nominating former Board Member Godofredo Berberabe. Berberabe died on March 4, 2013. The Running of Godofredo Berberabe is continued by his brother, Danilo Berberabe.

2013 Philippine House of Representatives election at Batangas' 2nd district
Party	Candidate	Votes	%
Nacionalista	Raneo Abu	94,531	39.86
UNA	Danilo Berberabe	93,426	39.39
Liberal	Christopher De Leon	34,218	14.43
Margin of victory		1,105	0.47%
Invalid or blank votes		15,003	6.33
Total votes		237,178	100.00
Nacionalista gain from Liberal			

=== 3rd District ===
Nelson Collantes is the incumbent. His opponents are former Representative Victoria Hernandez-Reyes, Tanauan Mayor Sonia Torres-Aquino and Nicomedes Hernandez

2013 Philippine House of Representatives election at Batangas' 3rd district
Party	Candidate	Votes	%
Liberal	Nelson Collantes	104,276	45.02
Independent	Sonia Aquino	80,459	34.74
Nacionalista	Victoria Hernandez-Reyes	23,473	10.13
PMP	Nicomedes Hernandez	6,912	2.98
Margin of victory		23,817	10.28%
Invalid or blank votes		231,636	100.00
Total votes		231,636	100.00
Liberal hold			

=== 4th District ===
Mark L. Mendoza is the incumbent. His opponent is Bernadette Sabili, wife of incumbent Lipa Mayor Meynardo Sabili.

2013 Philippine House of Representatives election at Batangas' 4th district
Party	Candidate	Votes	%
NPC	Mark L. Mendoza	161,131	57.58
Independent	Bernadette Sabili	103,446	36.97
Margin of victory		57,685	20.61%
Invalid or blank votes		15,247	5.45
Total votes		279,824	100.00
NPC hold			

== Cavite ==
=== 1st District ===
Incumbent Joseph Emilio Abaya resigned on October 18, 2012, in order to be the Secretary of Transportation and Communications. The seat is presently vacant up to election day. His brother, Francis Gerald is his party's nominee. Former Kawit mayor Fedrerico Poblete is his opponent, with movie director and activist Joel Lamangan withdrawing at the race.

2013 Philippine House of Representatives election at Cavite's 1st district
Party	Candidate	Votes	%
Liberal	Francis Gerald Abaya	94,283	67.96
Nacionalista	Federico Poblete	28,692	20.68
Margin of victory		65,591	47.28%
Invalid or blank votes		15,758	11.36
Total votes		138,733	100.00
Liberal hold			

=== 2nd District (Bacoor) ===
Lani Mercado is the incumbent.

2013 Philippine House of Representatives election at Cavite's 2nd district
Party	Candidate	Votes	%
Lakas	Lani Mercado		
Liberal	Jessie Castillo		
Independent	Gerbie Ber Ado		
Margin of victory			
Invalid or blank votes			
Total votes			
Lakas hold			

=== 3rd District (Imus) ===
Incumbent Erineo Maliksi is running for the governorship; his party nominated former board member Alex Advincula.

2013 Philippine House of Representatives election at Cavite's 3rd district
Party	Candidate	Votes	%
Liberal	Alex Advincula	57,141	59.81
Lakas	Albert Villasecca	28,759	30.10
Independent	Eleazar Salon	743	0.78
Margin of victory		28,382	29.71%
Invalid or blank votes		8,887	9.30
Total votes		95,530	100.00
Liberal hold			

=== 4th District (Dasmariñas) ===
Incumbent Elpidio Barzaga of the National Unity Party is also nominated by the Liberal Party.

2013 Philippine House of Representatives election at Cavite's 4th district
Party	Candidate	Votes	%
NUP	Elpidio Barzaga	133,570	80.86
Lakas	Miguel Ilano	18,844	11.41
Margin of victory		114,726	69.45%
Invalid or blank votes		12,776	7.73
Total votes		165,190	100.00
NUP hold			

=== 5th District ===
Roy Loyola is the incumbent.

2013 Philippine House of Representatives election at Cavite's 5th district
Party	Candidate	Votes	%
Liberal	Roy Loyola	118,036	79.80
Invalid or blank votes		29,887	20.20
Total votes		147,923	100.00
Liberal hold			

=== 6th District ===
Antonio Ferrer is running for mayor of General Trias. His brother, incumbent General Trias Mayor Luis "Jon Jon" Ferrer IV is his party's nominee. His opponent is former Vice Governor Dencito Campaña.

2013 Philippine House of Representatives election at Cavite's 6th district
Party	Candidate	Votes	%
NUP	Luis Ferrer IV	112,919	61.62
Liberal	Dencito Campaña	53,760	29.33
Margin of victory		59,159	32.28%
Invalid or blank votes		16,585	9.05
Total votes		183,264	100.00
NUP hold			

=== 7th District ===
Incumbent Jesus Crispin Remulla is term limited; his brother former Representative Gilbert Remulla is his party's nominee. His primary opponent is Abraham Tolentino, incumbent Mayor of Tagaytay and brother of Metropolitan Manila Development Authority Chairman Francis Tolentino

2013 Philippine House of Representatives election at Cavite's 7th district
Party	Candidate	Votes	%
Liberal	Abraham Tolentino	91,836	50.26
Nacionalista	Gilbert Remulla	76,961	42.12
Independent	Norman Versoza	1,662	0.91
Independent	Pedro Lopez	507	0.28
Margin of victory		14,875	8.14%
Invalid or blank votes		11,755	6.43
Total votes		182,721	100.00
Liberal gain from Nacionalista			

== Laguna ==
=== 1st District ===
Danilo Ramon Fernandez is the incumbent.

2013 Philippine House of Representatives election at Laguna's 1st district
Party	Candidate	Votes	%
Liberal	Danilo Ramon Fernandez	131,384	63.30
PDP–Laban	Gat-Ala Alatiit, Jr.	43,441	20.93
Margin of victory		87,943	42.37%
Invalid or blank votes		32,717	15.76
Total votes		207,542	100.00
Liberal hold			

=== 2nd District ===
2013 Laguna's 2nd congressional district election
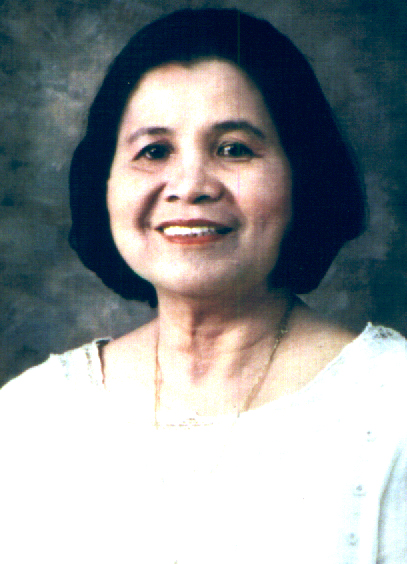
Candidate	Joaquin Chipeco, Jr.	Teresita Lazaro
Party	Liberal	PDP–Laban
Popular vote	168,010	105,253
Percentage	55.73%	34.91%
Philippine Representative before election
Justin Marc Chipeco
Nacionalista
Elected Philippine Representative
Joaquin Chipeco, Jr.
Liberal

Incumbent Timmy Chipeco is term limited; his father, Calamba mayor Jun Chipeco, Jr., is his party's nominee. His opponent is former governor Teresita Lazaro

2013 Philippine House of Representatives election at Laguna's 2nd district
Party	Candidate	Votes	%
Liberal	Joaquin Chipeco, Jr.	168,010	55.73
PDP–Laban	Teresita Lazaro	105,253	34.91
Margin of victory		62,757	20.82%
Invalid or blank votes		28,227	9.36
Total votes		301,490	100.00
Liberal hold			

=== 3rd District ===
Maria Evita Arago is the incumbent. She will oppose former ABS-CBN News anchor/reporter Sol Aragones.

2013 Philippine House of Representatives election at Laguna's 3rd district
Party	Candidate	Votes	%
UNA	Sol Aragones-Sampelo	92,273	47.13
Liberal	Maria Evita Arago	81,764	41.76
PDP–Laban	Celia Lopez	8,386	4.28
Margin of victory		10,509	5.37%
Invalid or blank votes		13,349	6.82
Total votes		195,772	100.00
UNA gain from Liberal			

=== 4th District ===
Incumbent Edgar San Luis is running for the governorship. His Liberal Party, named Benjamin Agarao Jr. as their nominee in this district.

2013 Philippine House of Representatives election at Laguna's 4th district
Party	Candidate	Votes	%
Liberal	Benjamin Agarao Jr.	91,737	41.76
Nacionalista	Antonio Carolino	79,695	36.28
PDP–Laban	Benedicto Palacol, Jr.	26,803	12.20
Margin of victory		11,772	5.36
Invalid or blank votes		21,443	9.76
Total votes		219,678	100.00
Liberal hold			

== Quezon ==
=== 1st District ===
Wilfredo Mark Enverga is the incumbent.

2013 Philippine House of Representatives election at Quezon's 1st district
Party	Candidate	Votes	%
NPC	Wilfredo Mark Enverga	108,714	71.96
Aksyon	Pauline Anne Villaseñor	23,828	15.77
Margin of victory		84,886	56.19%
Invalid or blank votes		18,537	12.27
Total votes		151,079	100.00
NPC hold			

=== 2nd District ===
Incumbent Irvin Alcala is running for the governorship; his uncle, Vice Governor Vicente Alcala, is his party's nominee. His opponents are former congresswoman Lynette Punzalan, Keigoutina Suarez, Lucena Mayor Barbara Ruby Talaga and Marivic Rivera

2013 Philippine House of Representatives election at Quezon's 2nd district
Party	Candidate	Votes	%
Liberal	Vicente Alcala	94,113	50.55
UNA	Barbara Ruby Talaga	42,791	22.98
Independent	Lynette Punzalan	16,245	8.73
Lakas	Keigoutina Suarez	9,124	4.90
Independent	Marivic Rivera	475	0.26
Margin of victory		51,322	27.56%
Invalid or blank votes		23,438	12.59
Total votes		186,186	100.00
Liberal hold			

=== 3rd District ===
Incumbent Danilo Suarez is term limited. His wife Aleta, is his party's nominee. Former Quezon Governor Eduardo Rodriguez also ran as independent.

2013 Philippine House of Representatives election at Quezon's 3rd district
Party	Candidate	Votes	%
Lakas	Aleta Suarez	64,805	54.99
Liberal	Shiela de Leon	35,836	30.41
Independent	Eduardo Rodriguez	956	0.81
Margin of victory		28,969	24.58%
Invalid or blank votes		16,254	13.79
Total votes		117,851	100.00
Lakas hold			

=== 4th District ===
Incumbent Lorenzo Tañada III is term limited; his brother Wigberto is his party's nominee.

2013 Philippine House of Representatives election at Quezon's 4th district
Party	Candidate	Votes	%
NPC	Angelina Tan	53,403	44.07
Liberal	Wigberto Tañada, Jr.	53,041	43.77
LM	Alvin John Tañada	4,735	3.91
Margin of victory		362	0.30%
Invalid or blank votes		9,996	8.25
Total votes		121,175	100.00
NPC gain from Liberal			

== Rizal ==
=== 1st District ===
Incumbent Joel Roy Duavit is running unopposed.

2013 Philippine House of Representatives election at Rizal's 1st district
Party	Candidate	Votes	%
NPC	Joel Roy Duavit	192,841	75.08
Invalid or blank votes		63,991	24.92
Total votes		256,832	100.00
NPC hold			

=== 2nd District ===
Incumbent Isidro Santos Rodriguez, Jr. is running unopposed.

2013 Philippine House of Representatives election at Rizal's 2nd district
Party	Candidate	Votes	%
NPC	Isidro Rodriguez, Jr.	163,416	64.34
Invalid or blank votes		90,591	35.66
Total votes		254,007	100.00
NPC hold			
