= King Collantes =

Filipino lawyer and politician (born 1980)

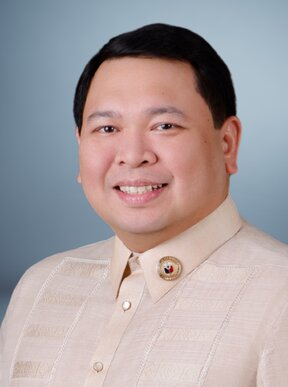
- Official portrait, 2023

Member of the House of Representatives of the Philippines from Batangas's 3rd district
- Incumbent
- Assumed office June 30, 2025
- Preceded by: Maria Theresa Collantes

Personal details
- Born: King George Leandro Antonio Valencia Collantes; October 11, 1980 (age 45) Tanauan, Batangas, Philippines
- Party: NPC
- Spouse: Andrea Armi Collantes
- Parents: Sonny Collantes (father); Maria Theresa Valencia (mother)
- Profession: Lawyer

King George Leandro Antonio Valencia Collantes (born October 11, 1980) is a Filipino lawyer and politician. He was elected as a congressman representing Batangas's 3rd congressional district under the Nationalist People's Coalition (NPC) in the 2025 elections.

== Early life and education ==
Collantes was born in Tanauan, Batangas on October 11, 1980, to politicians Sonny Collantes and Maria Theresa Collantes. He passed the Philippine Bar Examination in 2008.

== Career ==
Before entering elective politics, Collantes served as chief of staff to both his parents during their terms in Congress. He is also a member of the Integrated Bar of the Philippines.

=== Political career ===
In 2025, Collantes won a seat in the 20th House of Representatives of the Philippines, representing the 3rd district of Batangas. He succeeded his mother, Maria Theresa Collantes, who was term-limited.

== Controversies ==
In 2013, Collantes was involved in a widely reported incident after a video surfaced showing him punching a 66-year-old jeepney driver during a traffic altercation in Pasig. The transport group PISTON urged the Supreme Court and the Integrated Bar of the Philippines to disbar him for misconduct.

== Personal life ==
Collantes is married to Andrea Armi Collantes.

== See also ==
- Sonny Collantes
- Batangas
