= 2022 Tanauan local elections =

Philippine election

2022 Tanauan mayoral election
- May 9, 2022
	NPC	PDDS
Nominee	Sonny Collantes	Mark Anthony Halili
Party	NPC	PDDS
Running mate	Jhoanna Corona-Villamor	Herminigildo Trinidad, Jr.
Popular vote	61,391	55,266
Mayor before election
Mary Angeline Halili
PDDS
Elected mayor
Sonny Collantes
NPC

Tanauan City held its local elections on Monday, May 9, 2022, as a part of the 2022 Philippine general election. The voters elected candidates for the elective local posts in the city: the mayor, vice mayor, and the 10 members of its city council.

== Mayoral election ==
Incumbent Mary Angeline Halili is not running, initially preferring to return to private life. However, she filed her candidacy for congresswoman as a substitute candidate of Irich John Bolinas. Her oldest brother, businessman Mark Anthony Halili was running in her place. His opponent was former 3rd district representative Sonny Collantes.

Tanauan City mayoralty elections
Party	Candidate	Votes	%
NPC	Sonny Collantes	61,391	
PDDS	Mark Anthony Halili	55,266	
Margin of victory			
Valid ballots			
Invalid or blank votes			
Total votes			

== Vice mayoral election ==
Incumbent Atty. Herminigildo Trinidad Jr. is running for reelection. He will be challenged by incumbent provincial board member and former city mayor Atty. Jhoanna Corona-Villamor, who was initially planning to run for reelection in the provincial board but her father, former board member and former mayor Alfredo Corona, Collantes' original running mate, asked her to switch places for this election. The younger Corona assumed office as Mayor in 2018 after the assassination of Mayor Antonio Halili on July 2.

Tanauan City vice mayoralty elections
Party	Candidate	Votes	%
PDDS	Herminigildo Trinidad, Jr.	65,459	
NPC	Jhoanna Corona-Villamor	48,217	
Margin of victory			
Valid ballots			
Invalid or blank votes			
Total votes			

== City Council election ==
Incumbents are expressed in italics.

Party	Votes	%	Seats
Pederalismo ng Dugong Dakilang Samahan	445,920	47.85	6
Nationalist People's Coalition	304,291	32.65	3
Liberal Party	66,035	7.09	1
Nacionalista Party	43,471	4.67	–
Independent	72,126	7.74	–
Ex officio seats			2
Total	931,843	100.00	12

=== By ticket ===
==== Team Collantes-Corona ====
NPC/ Team Collantes-Corona
#	Name	Party	Result
For Mayor
1.	Sonny Collantes	NPC	Won
For Vice Mayor
1.	Jhoanna Corona-Villamor	NPC	Lost
For Councilors
2.	Sam Bengzon	Liberal	Won
4.	Benedicto Corona	NPC	Won
7.	Jun Gocuanco	NPC	Lost
9.	Macky Leus Gonzales	NPC	Lost
10.	Kristel Guelos	NPC	Won
12.	Carlos Laurel	Nacionalista	Lost
15.	Eric Manglo	NPC	Won
19.	Ed Quilao	NPC	Lost
20.	Rexander Quimio	NPC	Lost
23.	Ambet Sanggalang	NPC	Lost

==== Team Halili-Trinidad ====
PDDS/Team Halili-Trinidad
#	Name	Party	Result
For Mayor
2.	Mark Anthony Halili	PDDS	Lost
For Vice Mayor
2.	Herminigildo Trinidad Jr.	PDDS	Won
For Councilors
3.	Angel Burgos	PDDS	Won
5.	Herman De Sagun	PDDS	Won
8.	Glen Win Gonzales	PDDS	Won
11.	Oliver Oscar Infante	PDDS	Lost
13.	John Kennedy Macalindong	PDDS	Lost
14.	Jay-Ar Manaig	PDDS	Lost
16.	Czylene Marqueses	PDDS	Won
18.	Shirley Platon	PDDS	Lost
24.	Marissa Tabing	PDDS	Won
26.	Eugene Yson	PDDS	Won

=== Councilors ===
2022 Tanauan City Council Elections
Party	Candidate	Votes	%
Liberal	Sam Bengzon	66,035	
PDDS	Eugene Yson	53,795	
PDDS	Glen Win Gonzales	50,645	
PDDS	Marissa Tabing	50,467	
PDDS	Herman De Sagun	50,031	
PDDS	Czylene Marqueses	49,841	
NPC	Benedicto Corona	47,746	
PDDS	Angel Burgos	46,052	
NPC	Kristel Guelos	45,931	
NPC	Marcelo Eric Manglo	45,746	
Nacionalista	Luis Carlos Mariano Laurel II	43,471	
PDDS	Shirley Platon	41,035	
NPC	Jun Gocuanco	38,688	
PDDS	John Kennedy Macalindong	36,572	
NPC	Rexander Quimo	34,938	
PDDS	Oliver Oscar Infante	34,196	
PDDS	Jay-Ar Manaig	33,286	
NPC	Macky Leus Gonzales	32,682	
NPC	Ed Quilao	32,233	
Independent	Joven Amurao	26,443	
NPC	Ambet Sanggalang	26,327	
Independent	Rosemarie Ramilo	16,930	
Independent	Marcos Valdez	13,649	
Independent	Balbino Pariño	6,695	
Independent	Alejandro Ramos II	6,140	
Independent	Angelito Go	2,269	
Total votes		931,843	100.00

Party or alliance		Votes	%	Seats
Pederalismo ng Dugong Dakilang Samahan		445,920	47.85	6
Nationalist People's Coalition/Team Collantes-Corona	NPC	304,291	32.65	3
Nationalist People's Coalition/Team Collantes-Corona	Liberal	66,035	7.09	1
Nationalist People's Coalition/Team Collantes-Corona	Nacionalista	43,471	4.67	0
Nationalist People's Coalition/Team Collantes-Corona	Total	413,797	44.41	4
Independent		72,126	7.74	0
Total		931,843	100.00	10
