= Old Tanauan Church Ruins =

Church ruins in Batangas, Philippines

The ruins of Old Tanauan (Ruinas de Tanauan) located at the lake shore of Talisay in Batangas Province are remains of a church structure dating to the Spanish Colonial Period of the Philippines. It is the site of the first stone church of Tanauan, before the whole town relocated to its present location in 1754. Currently the ruins are within the property of Club Balai Isabel Resort.

== History ==
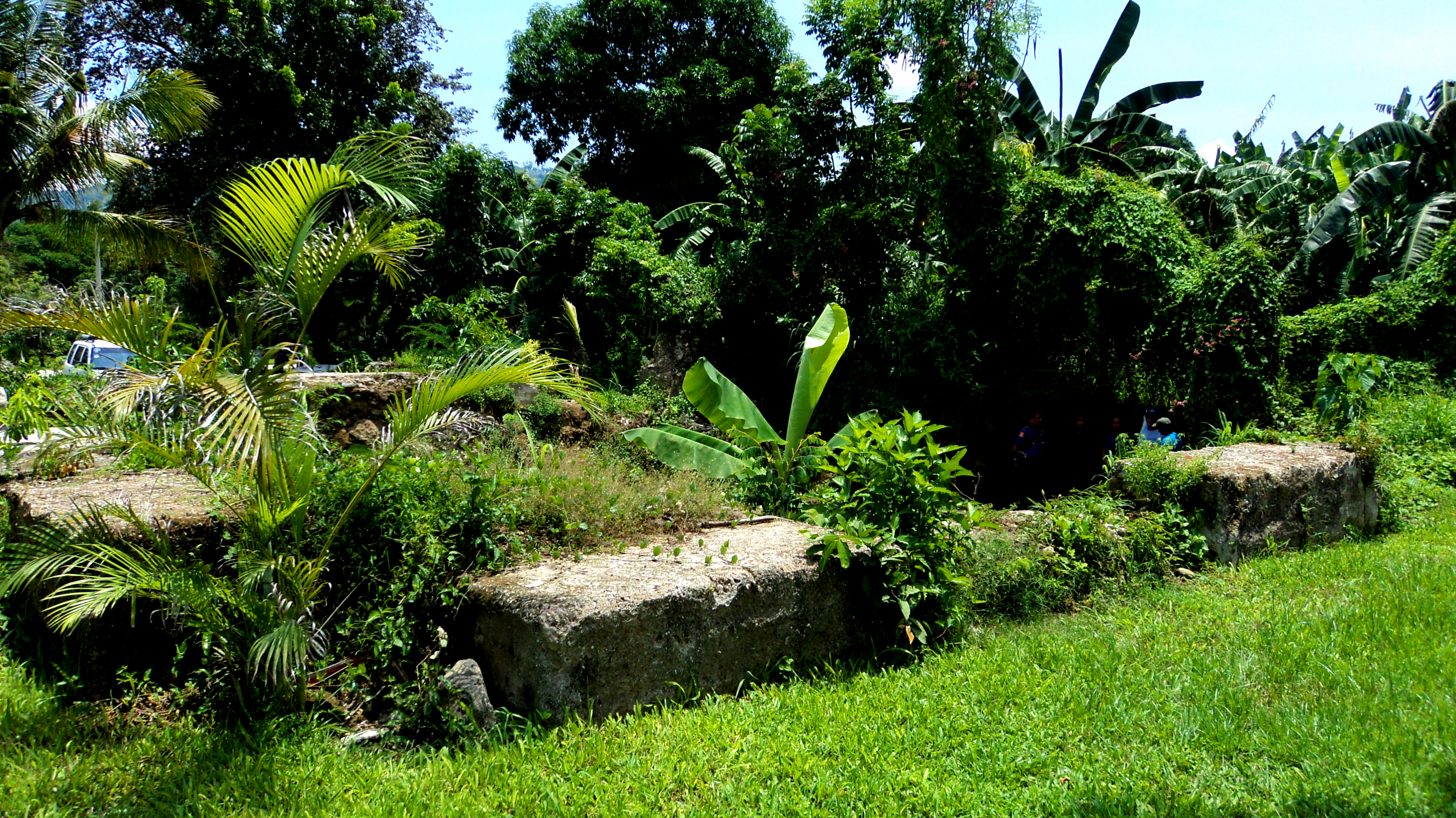
Ruins of the Old Tanauan Church

Tanauan was among the earliest lake shore towns established by the Augustinian missionaries (together with Taal, Lipa, Bauan and Sala) in Batangas around the late 16th century. Founded in 1584, the town was established at the northern shore of the Taal Lake (originally called Bonbon) near the foot of Tagaytay Ridge, which was described by a Spanish priest Fray Juan de Medina OSA as a "truly frightful hill for more than one legua" as one descends from Manila. Together with its founding was the building of the church and convent out of wooden materials. The wooden church was then replaced by a stone structure around 1732 as indicated in a Spanish historical document, which states the exemption of Tanauan from paying annual contributions to the monastery of San Agustin in Manila as the money was being used for the construction of their church. However, the stone church was short lived due to the violent eruption of the Taal Volcano in 1754, which devastated the towns around the lake; including Tanauan. Volcanic debris created blockage at the mouth of the Pansipit River south of Lake Taal, causing the water level of the lake to rise and submerge the northern and eastern lake shore towns. The rising flood waters, together with the series of earthquakes that were felt prior to the eruption, led the inhabitants of Tanauan to relocate to its present location, abandoning their old town.

== Structural features ==
The visible part of the church ruins are mostly the walls wherein two types of materials were used in its construction. Most of the remaining walls were composed of massive concrete masonry blocks made of lime, sand and mostly shells of sunset clams, a marine bivalve. Clay tiles were used in filling the gaps or lining between these wall blocks. Other parts of the ruins still have the remains of an upper wall level constructed in different set of materials composed of lime, sand, volcanic rocks and fragments of earthenware and stoneware ceramics. These materials were also found in interior wall features attached to the massive masonry blocks. Remains of stucco or paletada were still seen on the interior wall surface of the structure, which served as the plaster coating of the walls. Small buttress-like structures can also be found connected outside the walls of the ruins, which were made of smaller carved adobe blocks. Mortar (lime and sand) was used to cement these blocks together.

== Archaeological investigation of the ruins ==
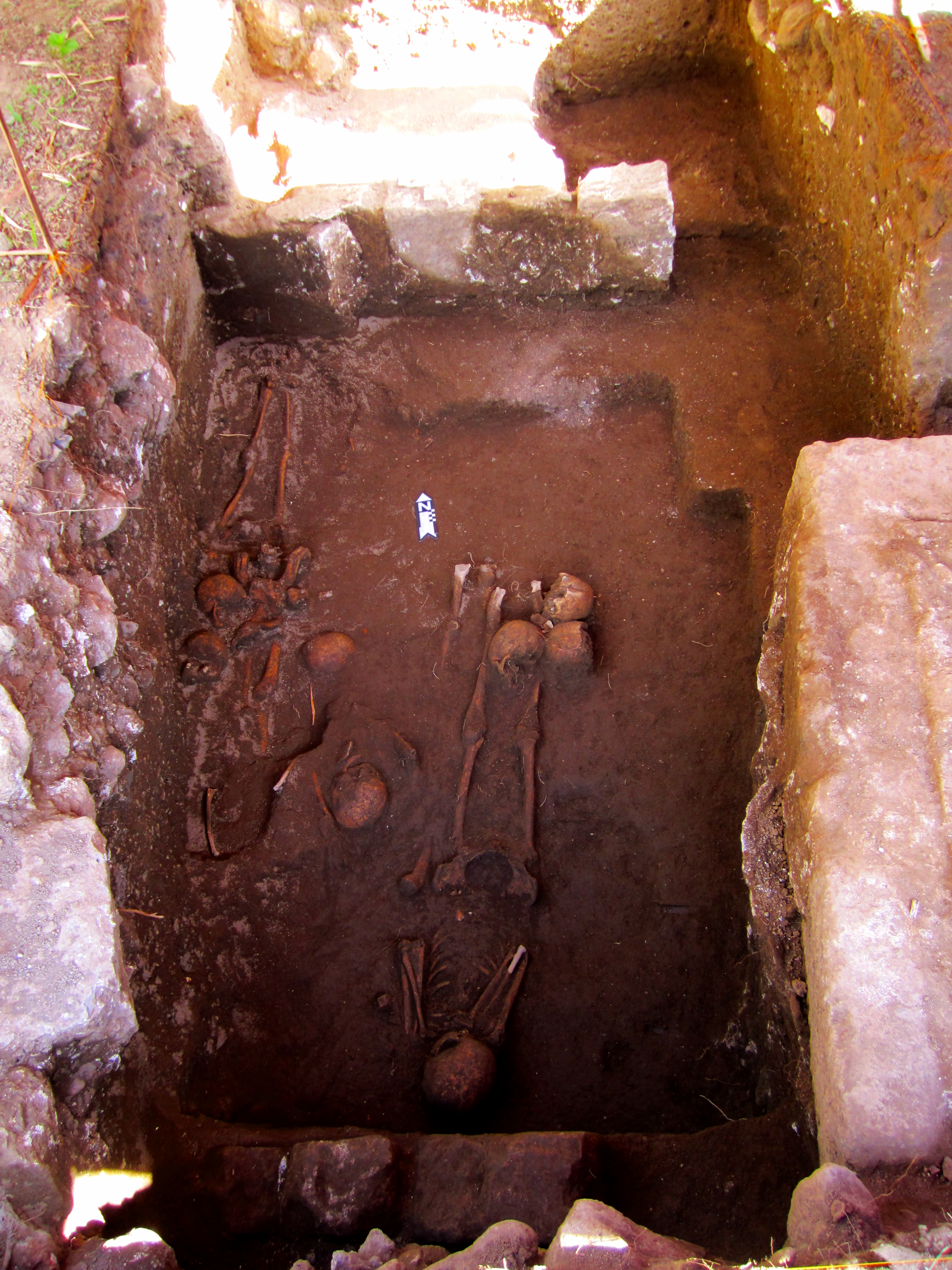
Burials exposed from the archaeological excavations within the Old Tanauan ruins

In 2010, human remains were accidentally unearthed during the landscaping activities of the Club Balai Isabel Resort, which was brought to the attention of the National Museum of the Philippines. The initial assessment of the archaeologists from the National Museum on the site prompted them to conduct an archaeological investigation. In 2011 systematic excavations were conducted within the ruins around the area where the human bones have been found and beside one of the walls. The excavations revealed evidences of major wall collapses on the upper stratigraphic levels of archaeological trenches, which occurred around 19th to early 20th century. On the lower layers of the trenches, articulated human burials and scatters of fragmented human bones have been recovered, suggesting the reuse of the church ruins as a cemetery, sometime after the 1754 eruption. Adobe structures and the stony foundation of the walls were also exposed during the excavation, revealing more of the masonry of the church ruins.
