= Tanauan Church (Batangas) =

Roman Catholic church in Batangas, Philippines

- Saint John the Evangelist Parish Church
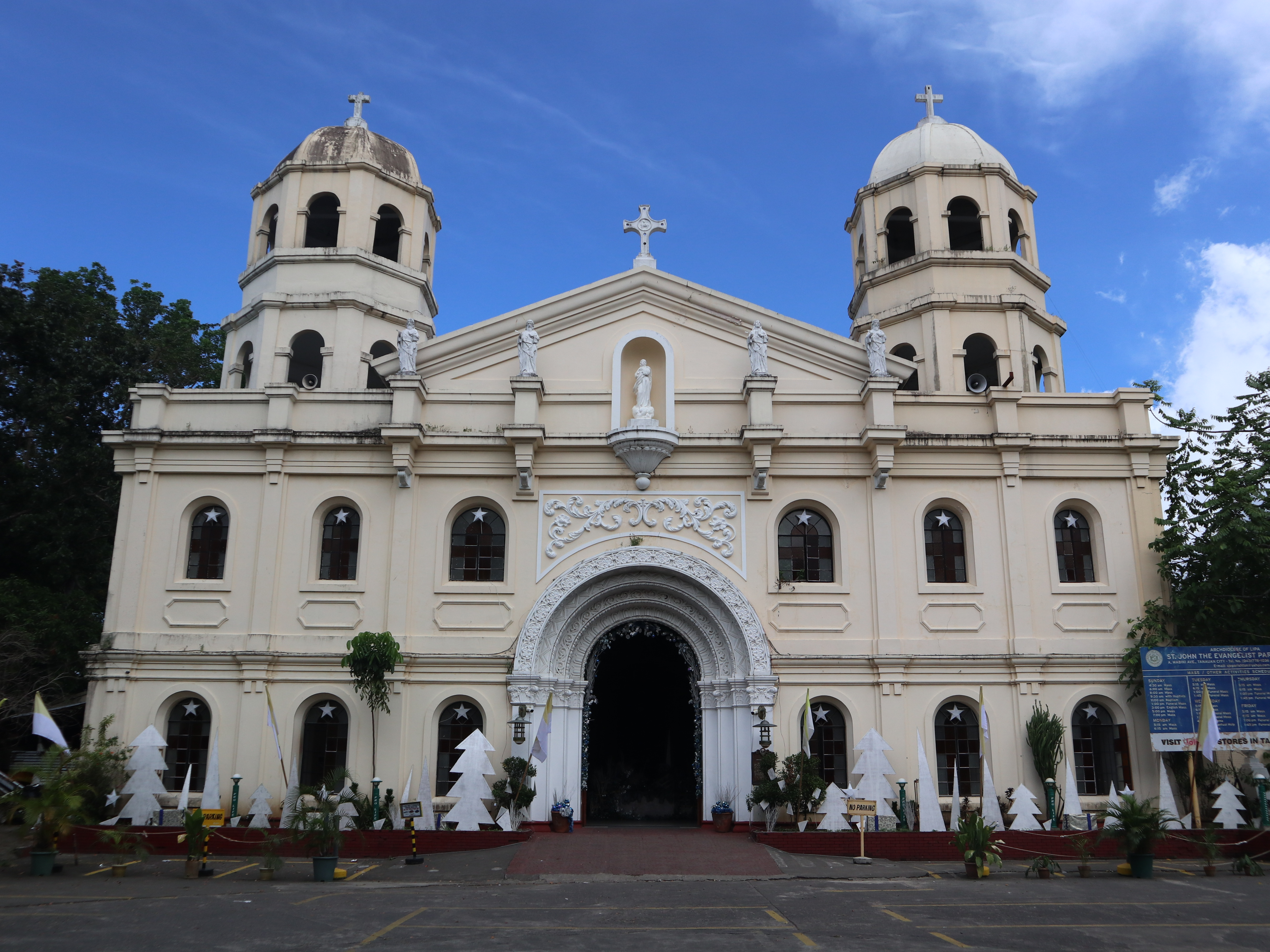
- Church facade in 2021

- Location in the Luzon Location in the Philippines
- 14°05′09″N 121°09′13″E
- Location: Tanauan, Batangas
- Country: Philippines
- Denomination: Roman Catholic

History
- Status: Parish church
- Dedication: John the Evangelist

Architecture
- Functional status: Active
- Heritage designation: Historical marker (National Historical Institute)
- Designated: 1991
- Architectural type: Church building
- Style: Romanesque and Renaissance
- Completed: 1881; 145 years ago

Administration
- Archdiocese: Lipa

Saint John the Evangelist Parish Church, commonly known as Tanauan Church, is a Roman Catholic church located in Tanauan, Batangas, Philippines. It is under the jurisdiction of the Archdiocese of Lipa.

Built in 1881, the church's facade was heavily influenced by Romanesque and Renaissance architectures. Its bell towers are topped by Baroque-styled domes. In addition, the church's compound has 14 life-sized Stations of the Cross.

The church was renovated in 1948 after being damaged in the World War II. The National Historical Institute, now the National Historical Commission of the Philippines, installed a historical marker on the church in 1991.

== Gallery ==
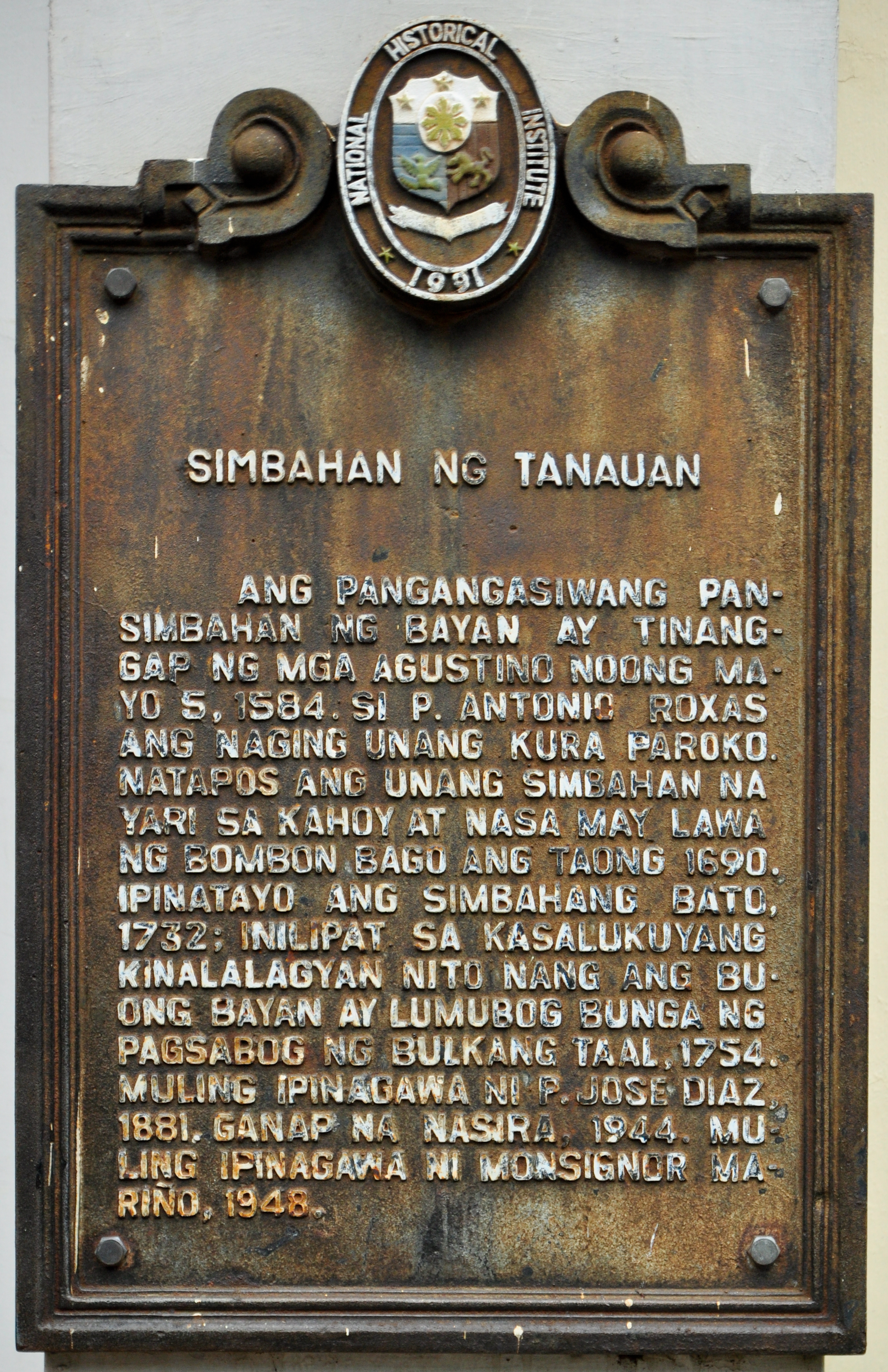
Church NHI marker installed in 1991

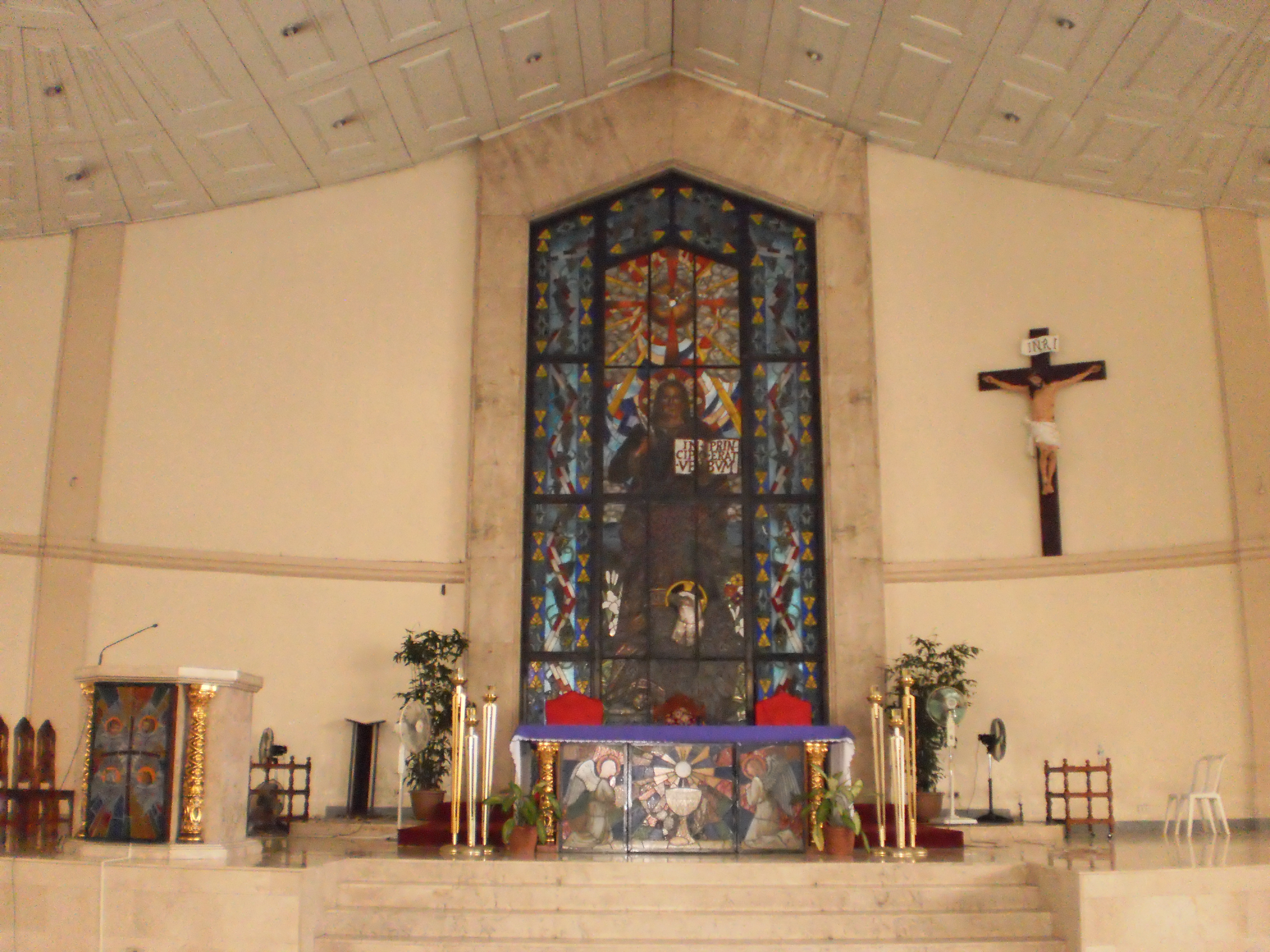
Church altar

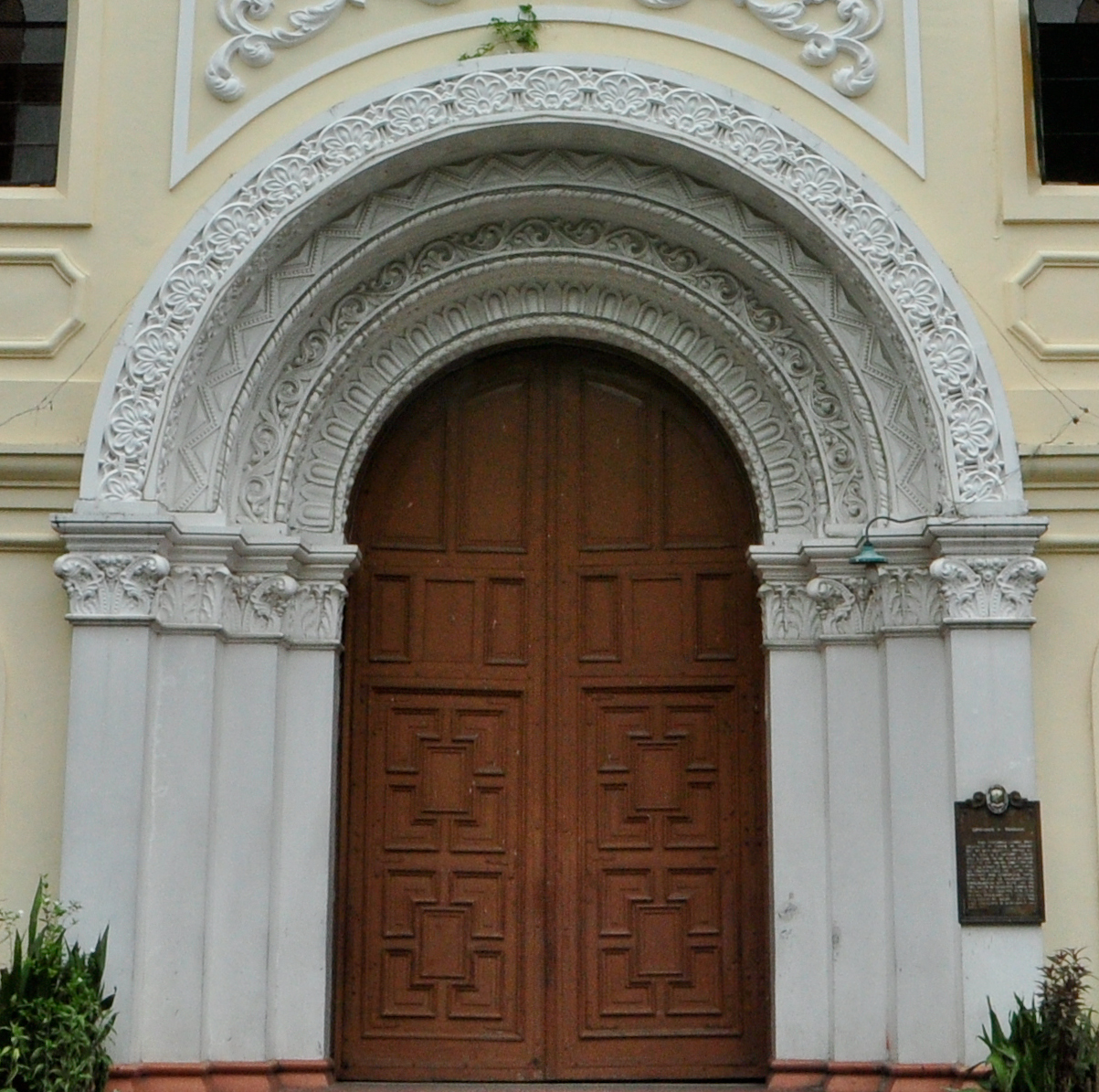
Church main door

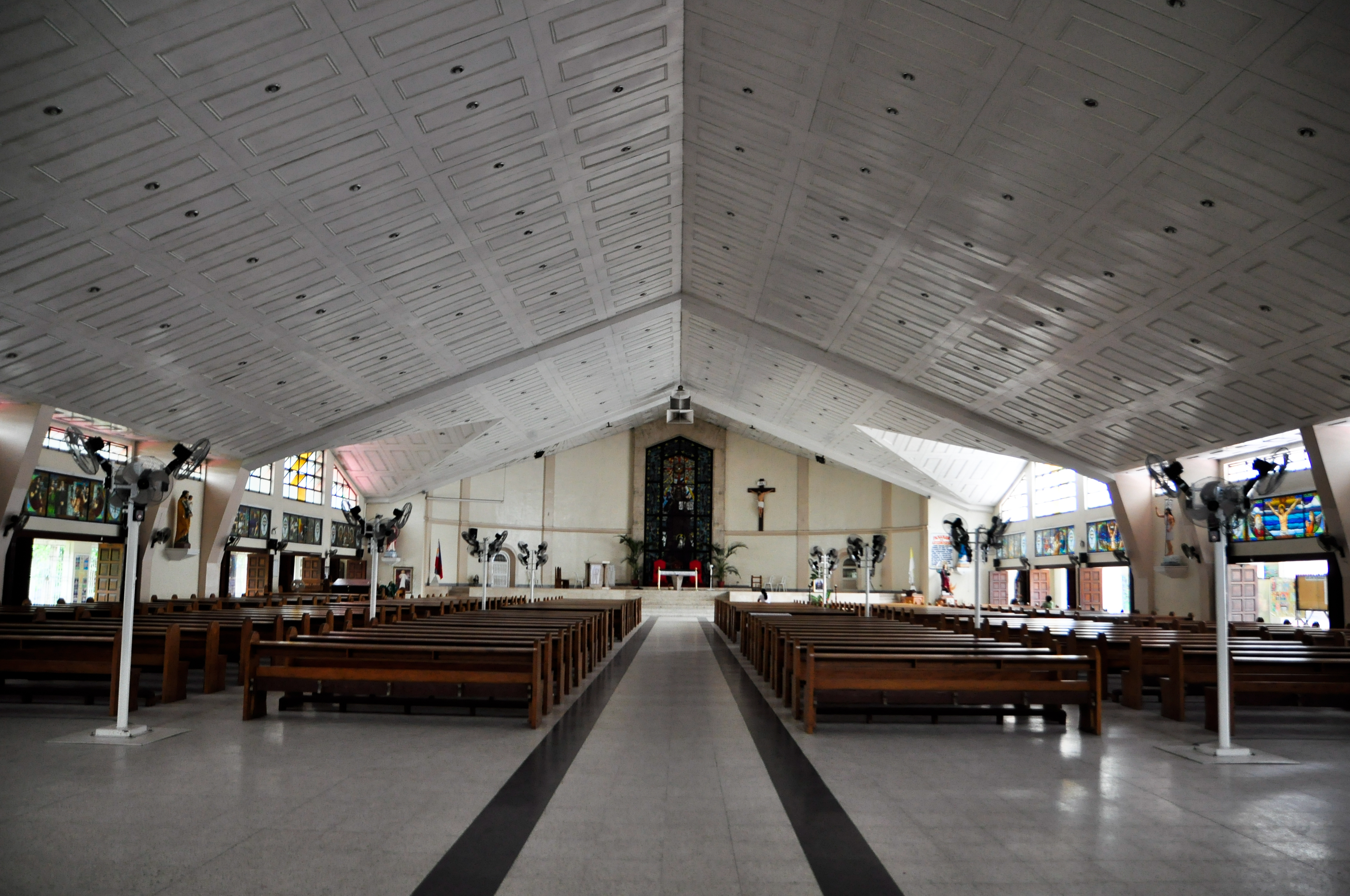
Church interior in 2012
