= Victoria Hernandez-Reyes =

Filipino politician

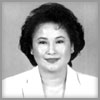

Member of the Philippine House of Representatives from Batangas' 3rd district
- In office June 30, 2001 – June 30, 2010
- Preceded by: Jose Laurel IV
- Succeeded by: Nelson P. Collantes

Member of Batangas Provincial Board from the 3rd District
- In office June 30, 1998 – June 30, 2001

Personal details
- Born: Victoria Fajardo Hernandez; September 3, 1954 Tanauan, Batangas, Philippines
- Died: September 30, 2016 (aged 62) Tanauan, Batangas , Philippines
- Cause of death: Stroke
- Party: Nacionalista (2009–2016)
- Other political affiliations: Lakas-CMD (1998–2009)
- Spouse: Rodrigo Reyes

Victoria Fajardo Hernandez-Reyes (September 10, 1954 – September 30, 2016) was a Filipina politician from Tanauan, Batangas. A former member of the Lakas–CMD, she had been elected to three terms as a member of the House of Representatives of the Philippines, representing the 3rd District of Batangas from 2001 to 2010. She first served as a member of the Batangas Provincial Board from the same district from 1998 to 2001.

She also ran for a comeback to the Congress in 2013 but lost to incumbent Sonny Collantes.

House of Representatives of the Philippines
Preceded by Jose Laurel IV	Representative, 3rd District of Batangas; 2001–2010	Succeeded by Sonny Collantes
