= Maria Theresa Collantes =

Filipino politician (born 1954)

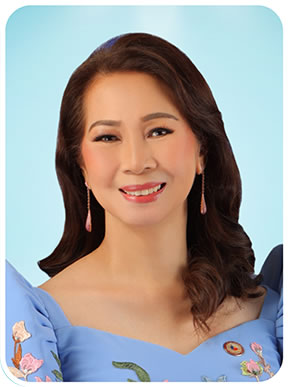
- Official portrait, 2022

Member of the Philippine House of Representatives from Batangas' 3rd District
- In office June 30, 2016 – June 30, 2025
- Preceded by: Sonny Collantes
- Succeeded by: King Collantes

Personal details
- Born: Maria Theresa Valencia; April 2, 1954 (age 72) Batangas, Philippines
- Party: Nationalist People's Coalition (2021–present)
- Other political affiliations: Liberal; PDP–Laban
- Spouse: Sonny Collantes (m. 1975)
- Children: King Collantes
- Occupation: Politician

Maria Theresa "Maitet" Valencia Collantes (born April 2, 1954) is a Filipina politician who served as the representative of Batangas's 3rd congressional district in the Philippine House of Representatives from 2016 to 2025. She is a member of the Nationalist People's Coalition (NPC).

== Political career ==
Collantes first assumed office in 2016, succeeding her husband, former representative and now Tanauan City Mayor Sonny Collantes. In 2022, she was re-elected for a third term. Her son, King Collantes, is the representative-elect for the district as of the 2025 elections.

She has introduced various bills such as:

- The creation of the Taal Lake Development Authority through House Bill No. 8003,
- The naming of the Taal Lake Circumferential Road as Assemblyman Manuel Collantes Road under House Bill No. 1886.

She has also worked on various welfare and community initiatives, such as:

- Promoting the DOLE TUPAD program for displaced workers,
- Leading barangay clean-up drives with TUPAD workers in coordination with DOLE.

In the 2022 Philippine House of Representatives elections, Collantes won her third term under NPC with 224,371 votes (60.94%).

== Personal life ==
Maitet is married to Nelson "Sonny" Collantes, a former congressman and current mayor of Tanauan City. Their son, Atty. King George Leandro Antonio Collantes, has been involved in political activities and is the NPC's nominee for the 3rd District seat in the upcoming 2025 elections which the latter won to succeed him.

As Collantes reaches the end of her third term, she remains a significant figure in Batangas politics, with her family's continued involvement suggesting a lasting legacy in the region.
