= Batangas's 3rd congressional district =

House of Representatives of the Philippines legislative district

- Constituency for the House of Representatives of the Philippines
- Map Boundary of Batangas's 3rd congressional district
- Location of Batangas within the Philippines
- Province: Batangas
- Region: Calabarzon
- Population: 768,561 (2020)
- Electorate: 478,027 (2022)
- Major settlements: 12 LGUs: Cities; Santo Tomas; Tanauan; Municipalities; Agoncillo; Alitagtag; Balete; Cuenca; Laurel; Malvar; Mataasnakahoy; San Nicolas; Santa Teresita; Talisay
- Area: 545.73 km^{2} (210.71 sq mi)

Current constituency
- Created: 1907
- Representative: King Collantes
- Political party: NPC
- Congressional bloc: Majority

Batangas's 3rd congressional district is one of the six congressional districts of the Philippines in the province of Batangas. It has been represented in the House of Representatives of the Philippines since 1916 and earlier in the Philippine Assembly from 1907 to 1916. The district consists of the northern Batangas cities of Santo Tomas and Tanauan, as well as adjacent municipalities surrounding the Taal Lake: Agoncillo, Alitagtag, Balete, Cuenca, Laurel, Malvar, Mataasnakahoy, San Nicolas, Santa Teresita and Talisay, a configuration that has been in place since 1987. It is currently represented in the 20th Congress by King Collantes of the Nationalist People's Coalition (NPC).

Prior to its second dissolution in 1972, the third district encompassed the city of Lipa and the eastern Batangas municipalities of Balete, Laurel, Malvar, Mataasnakahoy, Padre Garcia, Rosario, San Jose, Santo Tomas, Talisay, and Tanauan. The southeastern municipalities of Lobo and San Juan were also part of the district from its creation until 1928 when a minor reorganization, enacted into law a year earlier, transferred them to the second district. Simultaneously, Tanauan became part of this district.

== Representation history ==
#	Image	Member	Term of office		Legislature	Party	Electoral history	Constituent LGUs
#	Image	Member	Start	End	Legislature	Party	Electoral history	Constituent LGUs
=== Batangas's 3rd district for the Philippine Assembly ===
District created January 9, 1907.
1		Gregorio Catigbac	October 16, 1907	October 16, 1909	1st	Nacionalista	Elected in 1907.	1907–1916; Lipa, Lobo, Rosario, San Jose, San Juan de Bocboc, Santo Tomas
2		Teodoro Kalaw	October 16, 1909	October 16, 1912	2nd	Nacionalista	Elected in 1909.	1907–1916; Lipa, Lobo, Rosario, San Jose, San Juan de Bocboc, Santo Tomas
3		Fidel A. Reyes	October 16, 1912	October 16, 1916	3rd	Nacionalista	Elected in 1912.	1907–1916; Lipa, Lobo, Rosario, San Jose, San Juan de Bocboc, Santo Tomas
=== Batangas's 3rd district for the House of Representatives of the Philippine Islands ===
4		Benito Reyes Katigbak	October 16, 1916	June 3, 1919	4th	Nacionalista	Elected in 1916.	1916–1919; Bolbok, Lipa, Lobo, Rosario, San Jose, Santo Tomas
5		Claro M. Recto	June 3, 1919	June 5, 1928	5th	Demócrata	Elected in 1919.	1919–1922; Bolbok, Lipa, Lobo, Malvar, Rosario, San Jose, Santo Tomas, Taysan
5		Claro M. Recto	June 3, 1919	June 5, 1928	6th	Demócrata	Re-elected in 1922.	1922–1928; Lipa, Lobo, Malvar, Rosario, San Jose, San Juan, Santo Tomas, Taysan
5		Claro M. Recto	June 3, 1919	June 5, 1928	7th	Demócrata	Re-elected in 1925.	1922–1928; Lipa, Lobo, Malvar, Rosario, San Jose, San Juan, Santo Tomas, Taysan
6		José D. Dimayuga	June 5, 1928	June 5, 1934	8th	Nacionalista; Consolidado	Elected in 1928.	1928–1934; Lipa, Malvar, Rosario, San Jose, Santo Tomas, Talisay, Tanauan
6		José D. Dimayuga	June 5, 1928	June 5, 1934	9th	Nacionalista; Consolidado	Re-elected in 1931.	1928–1934; Lipa, Malvar, Rosario, San Jose, Santo Tomas, Talisay, Tanauan
7		Emilio U. Mayo	June 5, 1934	September 16, 1935	10th	Nacionalista; Democrático	Elected in 1934.	1934–1935; Lipa, Malvar, Mataasnakahoy, Rosario, San Jose, Santo Tomas, Talisay, Tanauan
#	Image	Member	Term of office		National Assembly	Party	Electoral history	Constituent LGUs
#	Image	Member	Start	End	National Assembly	Party	Electoral history	Constituent LGUs
=== Batangas's 3rd district for the National Assembly (Commonwealth of the Philippines) ===
8		Máximo M. Kalaw	September 16, 1935	December 30, 1941	1st	Nacionalista; Demócrata Pro-Independencia	Elected in 1935.	1935–1941; Lipa, Malvar, Mataasnakahoy, Rosario, San Jose, Santo Tomas, Talisay, Tanauan
8		Máximo M. Kalaw	September 16, 1935	December 30, 1941	2nd	Nacionalista	Re-elected in 1938.	1935–1941; Lipa, Malvar, Mataasnakahoy, Rosario, San Jose, Santo Tomas, Talisay, Tanauan
District dissolved into the two-seat Batangas's at-large district for the National Assembly (Second Philippine Republic).
#	Image	Member	Term of office		Common wealth Congress	Party	Electoral history	Constituent LGUs
#	Image	Member	Start	End	Common wealth Congress	Party	Electoral history	Constituent LGUs
=== Batangas's 3rd district for the House of Representatives of the Commonwealth of the Philippines ===
District re-created May 24, 1945.
9		José Laurel Jr.	June 11, 1945	May 25, 1946	1st	Nacionalista	Elected in 1941.	1945–1946; Lipa, Malvar, Mataasnakahoy, Rosario, San Jose, Santo Tomas, Talisay, Tanauan
#	Image	Member	Term of office		Congress	Party	Electoral history	Constituent LGUs
#	Image	Member	Start	End	Congress	Party	Electoral history	Constituent LGUs
=== Batangas's 3rd district for the House of Representatives of the Philippines ===
(9)		José Laurel Jr.	May 25, 1946	December 30, 1957	1st	Nacionalista	Re-elected in 1946.	1946–1949; Lipa, Malvar, Mataasnakahoy, Rosario, San Jose, Santo Tomas, Talisay, Tanauan
(9)		José Laurel Jr.	May 25, 1946	December 30, 1957	2nd	Nacionalista	Re-elected in 1949.	1949–1969; Lipa, Malvar, Mataasnakahoy, Padre Garcia, Rosario, San Jose, Santo Tomas, Talisay, Tanauan
(9)		José Laurel Jr.	May 25, 1946	December 30, 1957	3rd	Nacionalista	Re-elected in 1953.	1949–1969; Lipa, Malvar, Mataasnakahoy, Padre Garcia, Rosario, San Jose, Santo Tomas, Talisay, Tanauan
10		Jose Laurel IV	December 30, 1957	December 30, 1961	4th	Nacionalista	Elected in 1957.	1949–1969; Lipa, Malvar, Mataasnakahoy, Padre Garcia, Rosario, San Jose, Santo Tomas, Talisay, Tanauan
(9)		José Laurel Jr.	December 30, 1961	September 23, 1972	5th	Nacionalista	Elected in 1961.	1949–1969; Lipa, Malvar, Mataasnakahoy, Padre Garcia, Rosario, San Jose, Santo Tomas, Talisay, Tanauan
(9)		José Laurel Jr.	December 30, 1961	September 23, 1972	6th	Nacionalista	Re-elected in 1965.	1949–1969; Lipa, Malvar, Mataasnakahoy, Padre Garcia, Rosario, San Jose, Santo Tomas, Talisay, Tanauan
(9)		José Laurel Jr.	December 30, 1961	September 23, 1972	7th	Nacionalista	Re-elected in 1969. Removed from office after imposition of martial law.	1969–1972; Balete, Laurel, Lipa, Malvar, Mataasnakahoy, Padre Garcia, Rosario, San Jose, Santo Tomas, Talisay, Tanauan
District dissolved into the twenty-seat Region IV-A's at-large district for the Interim Batasang Pambansa, followed by the four-seat Batangas's at-large district for the Regular Batasang Pambansa.
District re-created February 2, 1987.
11		Milagros Laurel-Trinidad	June 30, 1987	June 30, 1998	8th	Nacionalista	Elected in 1987.	1987–present Agoncillo, Alitagtag, Balete, Cuenca, Laurel, Malvar, Mataasnakahoy, San Nicolas, Santa Teresita, Santo Tomas, Talisay, Tanauan
11		Milagros Laurel-Trinidad	June 30, 1987	June 30, 1998	9th	Lakas	Re-elected in 1992.	1987–present Agoncillo, Alitagtag, Balete, Cuenca, Laurel, Malvar, Mataasnakahoy, San Nicolas, Santa Teresita, Santo Tomas, Talisay, Tanauan
11		Milagros Laurel-Trinidad	June 30, 1987	June 30, 1998	10th	NPC	Re-elected in 1995.	1987–present Agoncillo, Alitagtag, Balete, Cuenca, Laurel, Malvar, Mataasnakahoy, San Nicolas, Santa Teresita, Santo Tomas, Talisay, Tanauan
11		Milagros Laurel-Trinidad	June 30, 1987	June 30, 1998	10th	Lakas	Re-elected in 1995.	1987–present Agoncillo, Alitagtag, Balete, Cuenca, Laurel, Malvar, Mataasnakahoy, San Nicolas, Santa Teresita, Santo Tomas, Talisay, Tanauan
(10)		Jose Laurel IV	June 30, 1998	June 30, 2001	11th	Nacionalista	Elected in 1998.	1987–present Agoncillo, Alitagtag, Balete, Cuenca, Laurel, Malvar, Mataasnakahoy, San Nicolas, Santa Teresita, Santo Tomas, Talisay, Tanauan
12		Victoria Hernandez-Reyes	June 30, 2001	June 30, 2010	12th	Lakas	Elected in 2001.	1987–present Agoncillo, Alitagtag, Balete, Cuenca, Laurel, Malvar, Mataasnakahoy, San Nicolas, Santa Teresita, Santo Tomas, Talisay, Tanauan
12		Victoria Hernandez-Reyes	June 30, 2001	June 30, 2010	13th	Lakas	Re-elected in 2004.	1987–present Agoncillo, Alitagtag, Balete, Cuenca, Laurel, Malvar, Mataasnakahoy, San Nicolas, Santa Teresita, Santo Tomas, Talisay, Tanauan
12		Victoria Hernandez-Reyes	June 30, 2001	June 30, 2010	14th	Lakas	Re-elected in 2007.	1987–present Agoncillo, Alitagtag, Balete, Cuenca, Laurel, Malvar, Mataasnakahoy, San Nicolas, Santa Teresita, Santo Tomas, Talisay, Tanauan
13		Sonny Collantes	June 30, 2010	June 30, 2016	15th	PMP	Elected in 2010.	1987–present Agoncillo, Alitagtag, Balete, Cuenca, Laurel, Malvar, Mataasnakahoy, San Nicolas, Santa Teresita, Santo Tomas, Talisay, Tanauan
13		Sonny Collantes	June 30, 2010	June 30, 2016	15th	Liberal	Elected in 2010.	1987–present Agoncillo, Alitagtag, Balete, Cuenca, Laurel, Malvar, Mataasnakahoy, San Nicolas, Santa Teresita, Santo Tomas, Talisay, Tanauan
13		Sonny Collantes	June 30, 2010	June 30, 2016	16th	Liberal	Re-elected in 2013.	1987–present Agoncillo, Alitagtag, Balete, Cuenca, Laurel, Malvar, Mataasnakahoy, San Nicolas, Santa Teresita, Santo Tomas, Talisay, Tanauan
14		Maria Theresa Collantes	June 30, 2016	June 30, 2025	17th	Liberal	Elected in 2016.	1987–present Agoncillo, Alitagtag, Balete, Cuenca, Laurel, Malvar, Mataasnakahoy, San Nicolas, Santa Teresita, Santo Tomas, Talisay, Tanauan
14		Maria Theresa Collantes	June 30, 2016	June 30, 2025	18th	PDP-Laban	Re-elected in 2019.	1987–present Agoncillo, Alitagtag, Balete, Cuenca, Laurel, Malvar, Mataasnakahoy, San Nicolas, Santa Teresita, Santo Tomas, Talisay, Tanauan
14		Maria Theresa Collantes	June 30, 2016	June 30, 2025	19th	NPC	Re-elected in 2022.	1987–present Agoncillo, Alitagtag, Balete, Cuenca, Laurel, Malvar, Mataasnakahoy, San Nicolas, Santa Teresita, Santo Tomas, Talisay, Tanauan
15		King Collantes	June 30, 2025	Incumbent	20th	NPC	Elected in 2025.	1987–present Agoncillo, Alitagtag, Balete, Cuenca, Laurel, Malvar, Mataasnakahoy, San Nicolas, Santa Teresita, Santo Tomas, Talisay, Tanauan

== Election results ==
=== 2025 ===
Candidate	Party	Votes	%
King Collantes	Nationalist People's Coalition	244,340	61.39
Mark Leviste	Independent	143,751	36.12
Nestor Burgos	Independent	9,932	2.50
Total		398,023	100.00
Registered voters/turnout		515,378	–
Nationalist People's Coalition hold			
Source: Commission on Elections

=== 2022 ===
2022 Philippine House of Representatives elections
Party	Candidate	Votes	%
NPC	Ma. Theresa Collantes	224,371	60.94
PDDS	Mary Angeline Halili	106,785	29.00
Independent	Gerry Natanauan	31,074	8.44
Independent	Nestor Burgos	5,968	1.62
Total votes		368,198	100.00
NPC hold			

=== 2019 ===
2019 Philippine House of Representatives elections
Party	Candidate	Votes	%
PDP–Laban	Ma. Theresa Collantes	200,450	70.70
Independent	Ma. Chona Dimayuga	63,430	22.37
Independent	Jose Gabriel Reyes	11,541	4.07
LM	Nestor Burgos	8,095	2.85
Total votes		283,516	100.00
PDP–Laban hold			

=== 2016 ===
2016 Philippine House of Representatives elections
Party	Candidate	Votes	%
Liberal	Maria Theresa Collantes	186,440	58.04%
Invalid or blank votes		134,768	41.96%
Total votes		321,208	100%
Liberal hold			

=== 2013 ===
2013 Philippine House of Representatives elections
Party	Candidate	Votes	%
Liberal	Nelson Collantes	104,276	48.47
Lakas	Sonia Aquino	80,459	37.40
Nacionalista	Victoria Hernandez-Reyes	23,473	10.91
UNA	Nicomedes Hernandez	6,912	3.21
Valid ballots		215,120	92.87
Invalid or blank votes		16,516	7.13
Total votes		231,636	100.00
Liberal hold			

=== 2010 ===
2010 Philippine House of Representatives elections
Party	Candidate	Votes	%
PMP	Nelson Collantes	67,238	27.19
Liberal	Cristeta Reyes	60,375	24.42
NPC	Ma. Chona Dimayuga	52,387	21.19
Nacionalista	Luis Carlos Laurel	36,023	14.57
Lakas–Kampi	Rodrigo Reyes	22,457	9.08
LM	Nicomedes Hernandez	8,790	3.55
Valid ballots		247,270	92.76
Invalid or blank votes		19,288	7.24
Total votes		266,558	100.00%
PMP gain from Lakas–Kampi			

=== 2007 ===
2007 Philippine House of Representatives elections
Party	Candidate	Votes	%
Lakas	Victoria Hernandez-Reyes	107,869	56.24%
PMP	Nelson Collantes	83,917	43.76%
Total votes		191,786	100.00%
Lakas hold			

== See also ==
- Legislative districts of Batangas

House of Representatives of the Philippines
Preceded by Pangasinan's 2nd congressional district	Home district of the speaker January 25, 1954 – December 30, 1957	Succeeded by Leyte's 4th congressional district
Preceded by Capiz's 2nd congressional district	Home district of the speaker February 2, 1967 – April 1, 1971	Succeeded by Capiz's 2nd congressional district
