= Sonny Collantes =

Filipino politician

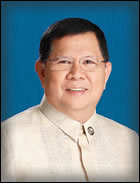

Mayor of Tanauan, Batangas
- Incumbent
- Assumed office June 30, 2022
- Vice Mayor: Herminigildo Trinidad Jr. (2022–2025); Wilfredo Ablao (2025–present)
- Preceded by: Mary Angeline Halili

Member of the Philippine House of Representatives from Batangas's 3rd district
- In office June 30, 2010 – June 30, 2016
- Preceded by: Victoria Hernandez-Reyes
- Succeeded by: Maria Theresa Collantes

Secretary of the Interior and Local Government
- Officer in Charge
- In office June 1, 1998 – June 30, 1998
- President: Fidel V. Ramos
- Preceded by: Epimaco Velasco
- Succeeded by: Joseph Estrada

Personal details
- Party: NPC (since 2021)
- Other political affiliations: Liberal (2011–2021); PMP (2005–2011); Independent (1998–2005)
- Spouse: Ma. Theresa Valencia Collantes (m. 1975)

Military service
- Allegiance: Philippines
- Branch/service: Philippine Air Force
- Rank: Brigadier general (reserve)

Nelson Perez Collantes, known as Sonny Collantes, is a Filipino politician and Air Force Reservist who has been the Mayor of Tanauan City, Batangas since 2022. He served as a member of the Philippine House of Representatives for the Third District of Batangas from 2010 to 2016, succeeding Victoria Hernandez-Reyes. He was one of the 24 Members of the 15th Congress who switched parties and joined the Liberal Party on June 25, 2010. He previously served as the OIC Secretary of the Interior and Local Government in June 1998, the final month of the Ramos administration. In 2018, the Commission on Appointments confirmed his promotion to the rank of Brigadier General (Reserve).

Political offices
Preceded by Epimaco Velasco	Secretary of the Interior and Local Government; 1998	Succeeded by Joseph Estrada
House of Representatives of the Philippines
Preceded by Victoria Hernandez-Reyes	Representative, 3rd District of Batangas; 2010–2016	Succeeded by Maria Theresa Collantes
