= Tanauan, Batangas =

Component city in Batangas, Philippines

Tanauan Tanawan
- Component city
- City of Tanauan
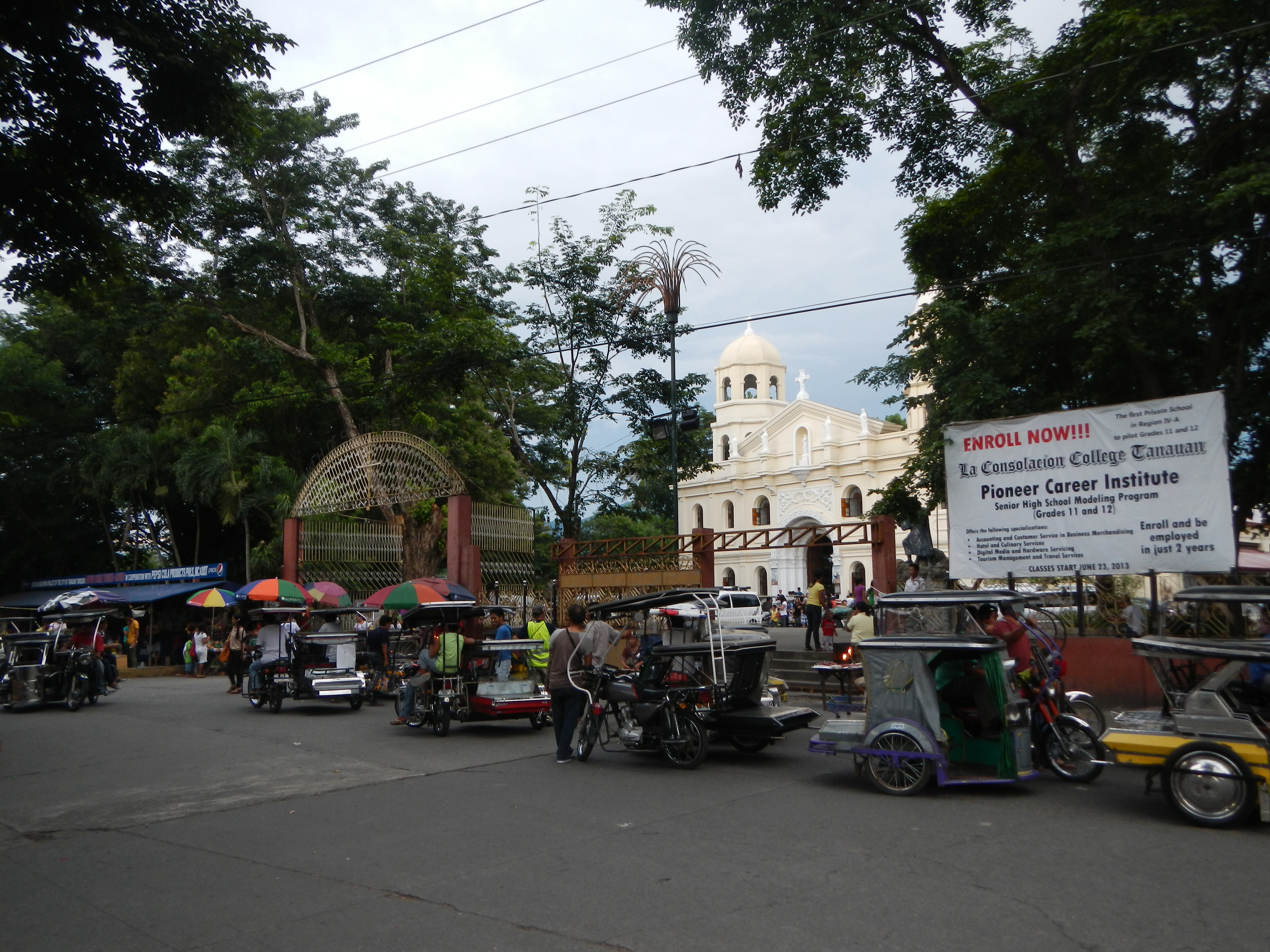
- F. Laurena Street in Tanauan

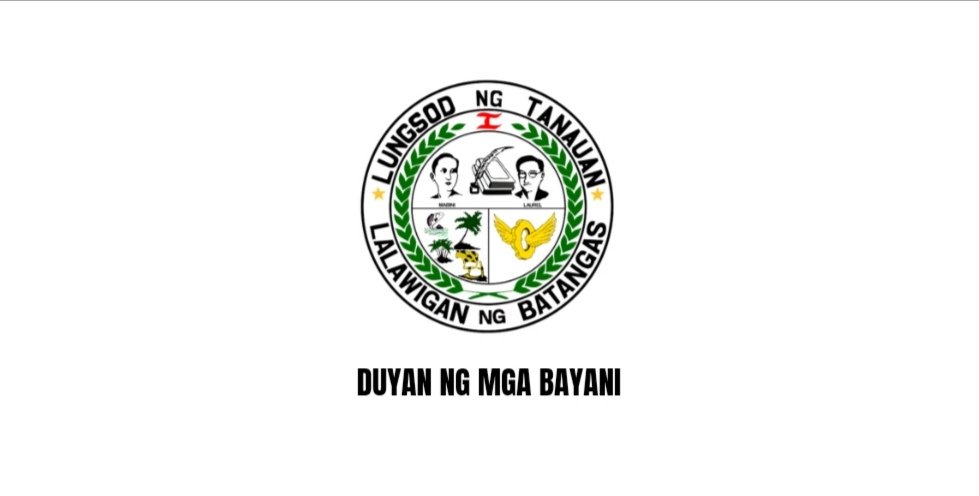
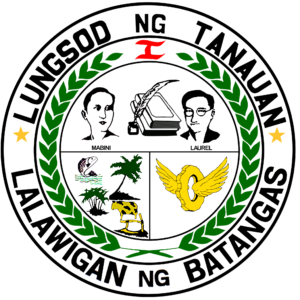
- Flag Seal
- Nicknames: Cradle of Noble Heroes; The City of Colors; Premiere City of CALABARZON
- Anthem: Himno ng Tanauan, Tanauan Bayan Ko English: Tanauan Hymn, Tanauan My Town
- Map of Batangas with Tanauan highlighted
- Interactive map of Tanauan
- Location within the Philippines, Captaincy General of the Philippines
- Coordinates: 14°05′N 121°09′E
- Country: Philippines
- Region: Calabarzon
- Province: Batangas
- District: 3rd district
- Founded: 1584; 442 years ago
- Cityhood: March 10, 2001
- Founder: Augustinians
- Barangays: 48 (see Barangays)

Government
  - Type: Sangguniang Panlungsod
  - Mayor: Nelson P. Collantes
  - Vice Mayor: Wilfredo P. Ablao
  - Representative: King George Leandro Antonio V. Collantes
  - City Council: Members: Tirso M. Oruga; Clarence P. Micosa; Potenciano P. Natanauan; Czylene P. Marqueses; Kristel N. Guelos; Marissa M. Tabing; Mario L. Gonzales; Rene P. Alcantara; Lilibeth P. Arcega; Marcelo Eric O. Manglo
  - Electorate: 151,400 voters (2025)

Area
  - Total: 107.16 km^{2} (41.37 sq mi)
- Elevation: 168 m (551 ft)
- Highest elevation: 1,094 m (3,589 ft)
- Lowest elevation: 5 m (16 ft)

Population (2024 census)
  - Total: 209,697
  - Density: 1,956.9/km^{2} (5,068.2/sq mi)
  - Households: 46,680
- Demonym(s): Tanaueño (masculine); Tanaueña (feminine)

Economy
  - Income class: 1st city income class
  - Poverty incidence: 5.97% (2023)
  - Revenue: ₱ 2,968 million (2024)
  - Assets: ₱ 8,697 million (2024)
  - Expenditure: ₱ 1,617 million (2024)
  - Liabilities: ₱ 919.4 million (2024)

Service provider
  - Electricity: Batangas 2 Electric Cooperative (BATELEC 2)
  - Water: MWPV South Luzon Water Corporation
- Time zone: UTC+8 (PST)
- ZIP code: 4232
- PSGC: 041031000
- IDD : area code: +63 (0)43
- Native languages: Tagalog
- Numbered highways: E2 (STAR Tollway); N4 (Jose P. Laurel Highway); N421 (Tanauan–Talisay Road)
- Feast date: December 27
- Patron saint: Saint John the Evangelist
- Website: www.tanauancity.gov.ph

Tanauan, officially the City of Tanauan (Filipino: Lungsod ng Tanauan), is a component city in the province of Batangas, Philippines. According to the 2024 census, it has a population of 209,697 people.

It is known as the birthplace of Apolinario Mabini, the 1st Prime Minister of the Philippines, and José P. Laurel, the 3rd President of the Philippines.

The town was incorporated as a city under Republic Act No. 9005, signed on February 2, 2001, and entered into force on March 10, 2001.

== Etymology ==
The name "Tanauan" may have come from:

- the Tagalog word tanaw, which means "to look through [the window]," as it was the site of a lookout tower that provides a view of the Pansipit River on the other side of Taal Lake and of the surrounding lands; or
- tanawa, a shrub that flourished in the area and on the shoreline of Taal Lake, according to the National Historical Commission of the Philippines.

Like most Batangueños, Tanauan residents also pronounce the city's name as Tan-awan, in Batangas Tagalog dialect, despite the spelling. It is also spelled as Tanawan.

== History ==
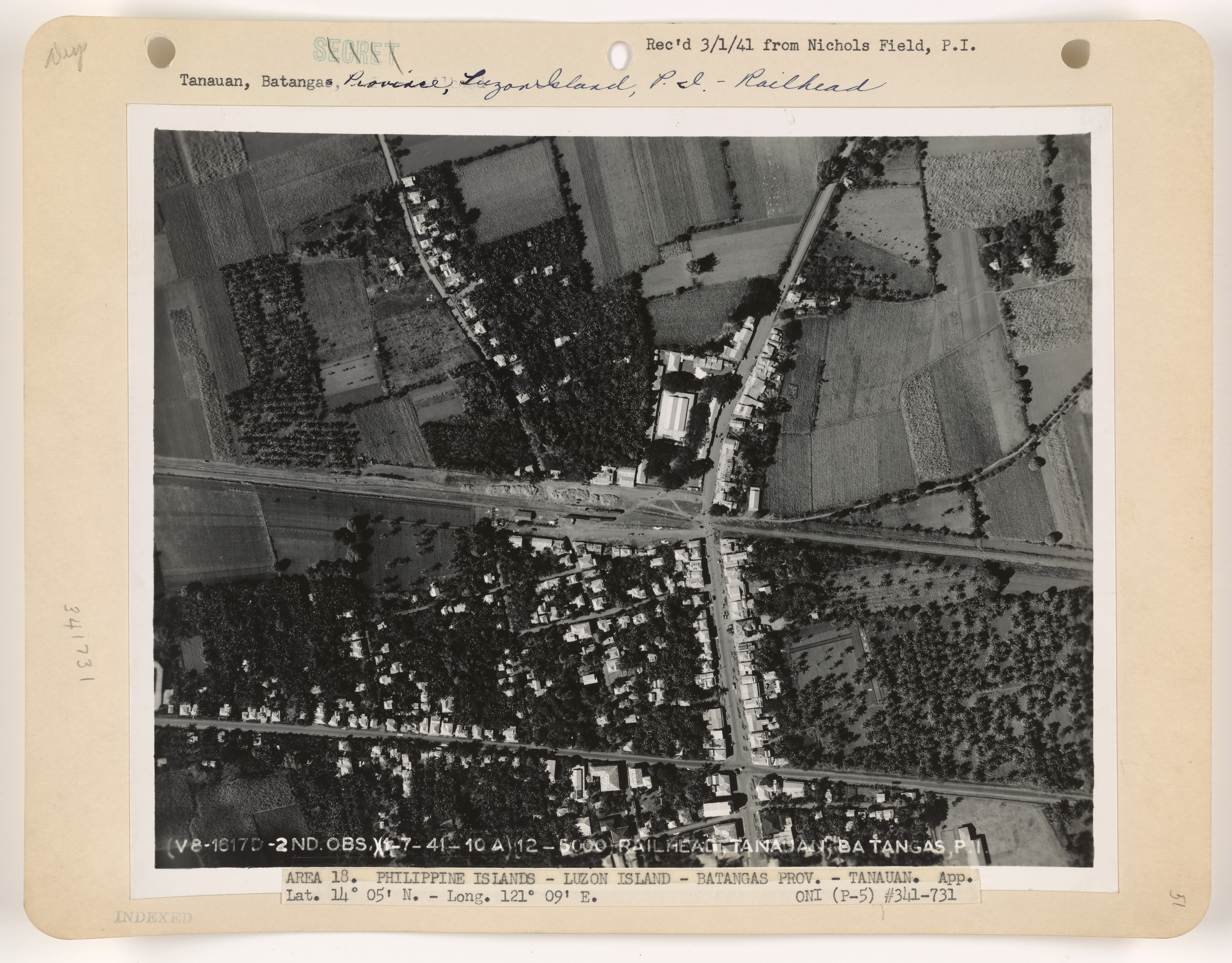
Aerial view of Tanauan, 1941

Tanauan was founded by the Augustinians in 1584 on the northwestern bay of Taal Lake (formerly Bombon Lake), called Tanauan Bay. Watchtowers were built alongside 16th and 17th century churches to forewarn of Moro raids. "Old Tanauan" (Tagalog: Lumang Tanauan) included such a watchtower and associated sapao (sunken ruins). The 1754 eruption of Taal Volcano forced the town inhabitants to initially move to Sala. Subsequently, both towns moved again later that year to Tanauan's current location, in which Sala is now a barrio.

Tanaueños have displayed characteristics of personal independence and nationalism since early history. The town is called the cradle of noble heroes due to its contribution to the revolutionary movement of its sons Apolinario Mabini, the Brains of the Revolution, and later by the statesman José P. Laurel. Also, three Tanaueños served as governors of Batangas, namely: José P. Laurel V, Modesto Castillo and Nicolas Gonzales.

From 1903 to 1906, during the American occupation, it was consolidated with the municipality of Talisay and became the seat of the municipal government. In 1904, the barrios of Balaquilong (Balakilong), Bayuyungan, Binirayan (Berinayan), Bugaan, and San Gabriel were ceded to Taal by virtue of Act No. 1244; these barrios would eventually be returned to Talisay and later form the present-day Laurel.

Recent events include the assassination of its former mayor, Cesar V. Platon, by NPA rebels on May 7, 2001, as he was running for the governorship of Batangas. This happened in Tuy a few days before the election. On July 2, 2018, then-mayor Antonio Halili, noted for public humiliation campaigns against criminals and drug pushers, was shot and killed during the flag raising ceremony at the city hall at age 72.

=== Cityhood ===
The Congress approved Batangas 3rd District Representative Jose Macario Laurel IV's bill and a Senate counterpart measure to convert the municipality of Tanauan into a city on December 19, 2000. Republic Act No. 9005, known as "The Charter of the City of Tanauan," was signed into law on February 2, 2001, by President Gloria Macapagal Arroyo.

On March 10, 2001, the charter was approved by a referendum in Tanauan that drew 8,890 or 16% of the 55,453 registered voters. The "yes" option won 7,026 to 1,961.

== Geography ==
Tanauan is situated 64 kilometers (40 mi) south of Manila and 41 kilometers (25 mi) north of Batangas City. The city is part of Mega Manila resulting from the continuous expansion of Metro Manila. It shares its borders with Calamba, Laguna, to the north, Tagaytay, Cavite, to the northwest, Talisay to the west, Santo Tomas to the east, and the towns of Balete and Malvar to the south. It borders on Taal Lake to the west. The town is known for the Old Tanauan Church Ruins, the most important archaeological site in the municipality where human remains from the colonial era have been unearthed.

=== Barangays ===
Tanauan is politically subdivided into 48 barangays, as indicated in the matrix below. Each barangay consists of puroks and some have sitios.

Barangays of Tanauan, Batangas
Barangay	Land area (hectares)	Population (2020 census)	District
Altura Bata	164.64	1,455	None
Altura Matanda	100.97	604	None
Altura South	102.18	781	None
Ambulong	218.38	7,241	La Playa de Tanauan
Bañadero	189.28	5,078	La Playa de Tanauan
Bagbag	569.67	3,655	None
Bagumbayan	239.00	7,657	None
Balele	620.43	9,995	None
Banjo East	145.92	3,482	None
Banjo Laurel (Banjo West)	308.45	2,158	None
Bilogbilog	406.44	5,469	None
Boot	385.43	6,505	La Playa de Tanauan
Cale	366.04	3,951	None
Darasa	327.28	23,987	None
Gonzales	188.29	2,047	La Playa de Tanauan
Hidalgo	97.31	1,156	None
Janopol Occidental	245.10	2,838	None
Janopol Oriental	289.91	3,403	None
Laurel	269.19	1,514	None
Luyos	183.23	1,795	None
Mabini	183.13	2,688	None
Malaking Pulo	543.60	4,237	None
Maria Paz	295.56	2,993	La Playa de Tanauan
Maugat	222.69	2,334	None
Montaña (Ik-ik)	94.20	1,718	None
Natatas	374.79	5,790	None
Pagaspas	311.71	5,861	None
Pantay Matanda	257.56	5,557	None
Pantay Bata	310.66	2,895	None
Poblacion Barangay 1	19.98	1,975	Poblacion
Poblacion Barangay 2	17.04	1,034	Poblacion
Poblacion Barangay 3	41.38	5,132	Poblacion
Poblacion Barangay 4	32.87	5,234	Poblacion
Poblacion Barangay 5	8.71	1,443	Poblacion
Poblacion Barangay 6	20.36	3,549	Poblacion
Poblacion Barangay 7	36.53	5,222	Poblacion
Sala	216.89	2,540	None
Sambat	88.82	4,446	None
San Jose	127.29	1,218	None
Santol (Doña Jacoba Garcia)	104.03	608	None
Santor	318.85	5,088	None
Sulpoc	400.18	2,052	None
Suplang	229.57	1,452	None
Talaga	442.62	5,600	None
Tinurik	229.82	6,071	None
Trapiche	241.21	7,842	None
Ulango	290.00	2,839	None
Wawa	112.93	1,747	La Playa de Tanauan

=== Climate ===
Climate data for Tanauan
Month	Jan	Feb	Mar	Apr	May	Jun	Jul	Aug	Sep	Oct	Nov	Dec	Year
Mean daily maximum °C (°F)	28 (82)	29 (84)	31 (88)	32 (90)	31 (88)	29 (84)	28 (82)	28 (82)	28 (82)	28 (82)	28 (82)	28 (82)	29 (84)
Mean daily minimum °C (°F)	19 (66)	19 (66)	20 (68)	21 (70)	23 (73)	24 (75)	23 (73)	23 (73)	23 (73)	22 (72)	21 (70)	20 (68)	22 (71)
Average precipitation mm (inches)	11 (0.4)	13 (0.5)	14 (0.6)	32 (1.3)	101 (4.0)	142 (5.6)	208 (8.2)	187 (7.4)	175 (6.9)	131 (5.2)	68 (2.7)	39 (1.5)	1,121 (44.3)
Average rainy days	5.2	5.0	7.4	11.5	19.8	23.5	27.0	25.9	25.2	23.2	15.5	8.3	197.5
Source: Meteoblue

== Demographics ==
Population census of Tanauan
Year	Pop.	±% p.a.
1903	18,263	—
1918	22,473	+1.39%
1939	26,186	+0.73%
1948	30,203	+1.60%
1960	44,975	+3.37%
1970	61,910	+3.24%
1975	66,703	+1.51%
1980	74,020	+2.10%
1990	92,754	+2.28%
1995	103,868	+2.14%
2000	117,539	+2.69%
2007	142,537	+2.70%
2010	152,393	+2.46%
2015	173,366	+2.49%
2020	193,936	+2.39%
2024	209,697	+1.89%
Source: Philippine Statistics Authority

=== Religion ===
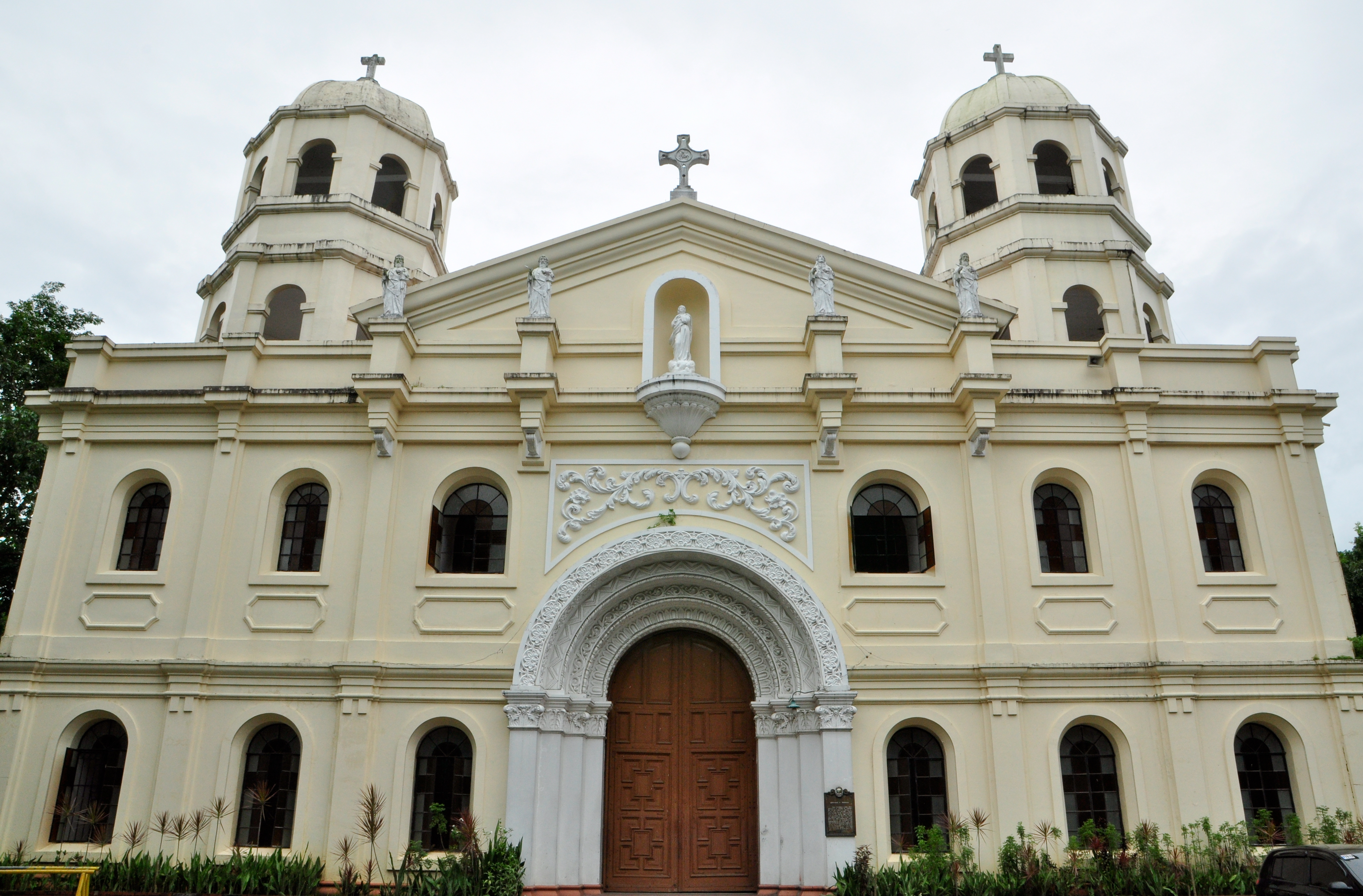
St. John the Evangelist Parish Church (Tanauan Church)

Roman Catholicism is the most dominant and visible religion in Tanauan. St. John the Evangelist is its patron, and its main church is the St. John the Evangelist Parish, also known as the Tanauan Church. La Consolacion College Tanauan (formerly Our Lady of Fatima Academy, 1948), run by the Augustinian Sisters of Our Lady of Consolation, is the first Catholic school in the city. Other Catholic schools include Our Lady of Assumption Montessori School and Daughters of Mary Immaculate School (lay-operated). First Asia Institute is converting from a non-sectarian school to a Catholic (Christian) school.

Iglesia Filipina Independiente, under the Diocese of MaQueBaCa, also maintains a presence in the city, under the Mission Parish of Nuestra Señora de la Paz y del Buen Viaje in Collantes St., Brgy. Malaking Pulo.

Iglesia ni Cristo, Jehovah's Witnesses, Mormons (The Church of Jesus Christ of Latter-day Saints), Islam and other religious groups are also present in the city.

== Economy ==
Poverty incidence of Tanauan (%)

Source: Philippine Statistics Authority

Tanauan is known as an agricultural trading center of Calabarzon. Agricultural products from Calabarzon and as far as the Mimaropa and Bicol regions are delivered here before it reaches public markets in Metro Manila. Aside from being an important agricultural center, Tanauan is also one of the Philippines' major industrial centers nowadays hosting industrial parks, which are home to various multinational companies and tourism facilities.

Economic Zones and Business Districts
Name	Description
First Philippine Industrial Park	An industrial park owned by Lopez Group and Sumitomo Corporation located in Tanauan and Santo Tomas, Batangas. The Tanauan part hosts various multinational companies such as Nestlé (materials management center), Honda, Brother Printers, Canon Philippines, Shimano, B/E Aerospace, Philip Morris-Fortune Tobacco Corporation and many more.
First Industrial Township Incorporated	Formerly PhilTown Technology Center located in Barangay Pagaspas which is now owned by First Philippine Holdings of the Lopez Group of Companies. This is home to Uni-President Philippines, the manufacturer of Homi instant noodles and Nooda Crunch.
Mira City	The first fully integrated mixed use township development in the city by Daiichi Properties.
Dolores Industrial Park	An industrial park in the Tanauan-Malvar area. It is the location of Metro Manila Turf Club.
Data Land Industrial Park	An industrial park owned by Data Land Corporation. This hosts the precast manufacturing facility of the said company.
Tanauan City Zentrum	A multi-sectoral development by the Torres Group of Companies located at the center of the new Tanauan Central Business District. It is now the location of the new Tanauan City Hall, which was inaugurated last July 23, 2017. In front of the new city hall is the new Tanauan People's Park. Aside from government centers, TCZ will also hosts office towers, condominiums and commercial centers by 2019.
Tagaytay Highlands Tourism Economic Zone	A proposed expansion of Tagaytay Highlands by Belle Corporation.

=== Panaderia Pantoja ===
The original 68-year old Pantoja Bakery started in 1950. Celinda Laurel Dimayuga (Tanauan) and Aurelio Maningat Pantoja (Balayan) used a "pugon" (clay brick oven). Spouses Arturo Dimayuga Pantoia and Marilyn Gonzales managed the bakery and mechanized it in 1970. The iconic bakery is famous for traditional Filipino breads and biscuits, like pandesal, paborita biscuits and square, crisp jacobina crafted from paper-thin sheets of dough.

== Tourism ==
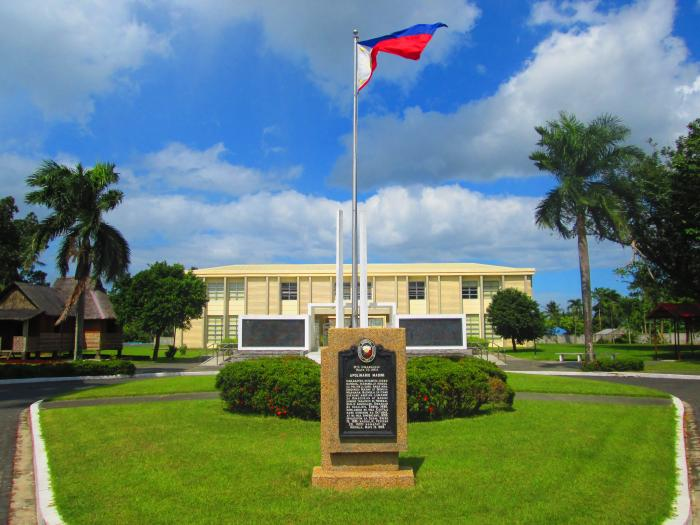
Gat. Apolinario Mabini Shrine and Museum

=== JCastles Theme Park ===
The first-biggest immersive theme park in the Philippines located in Brgy. Gonzales.

It spans two main themed zones, each with nine unique attractions, totaling 18 interactive and sensory-rich experiences.

== Transportation ==
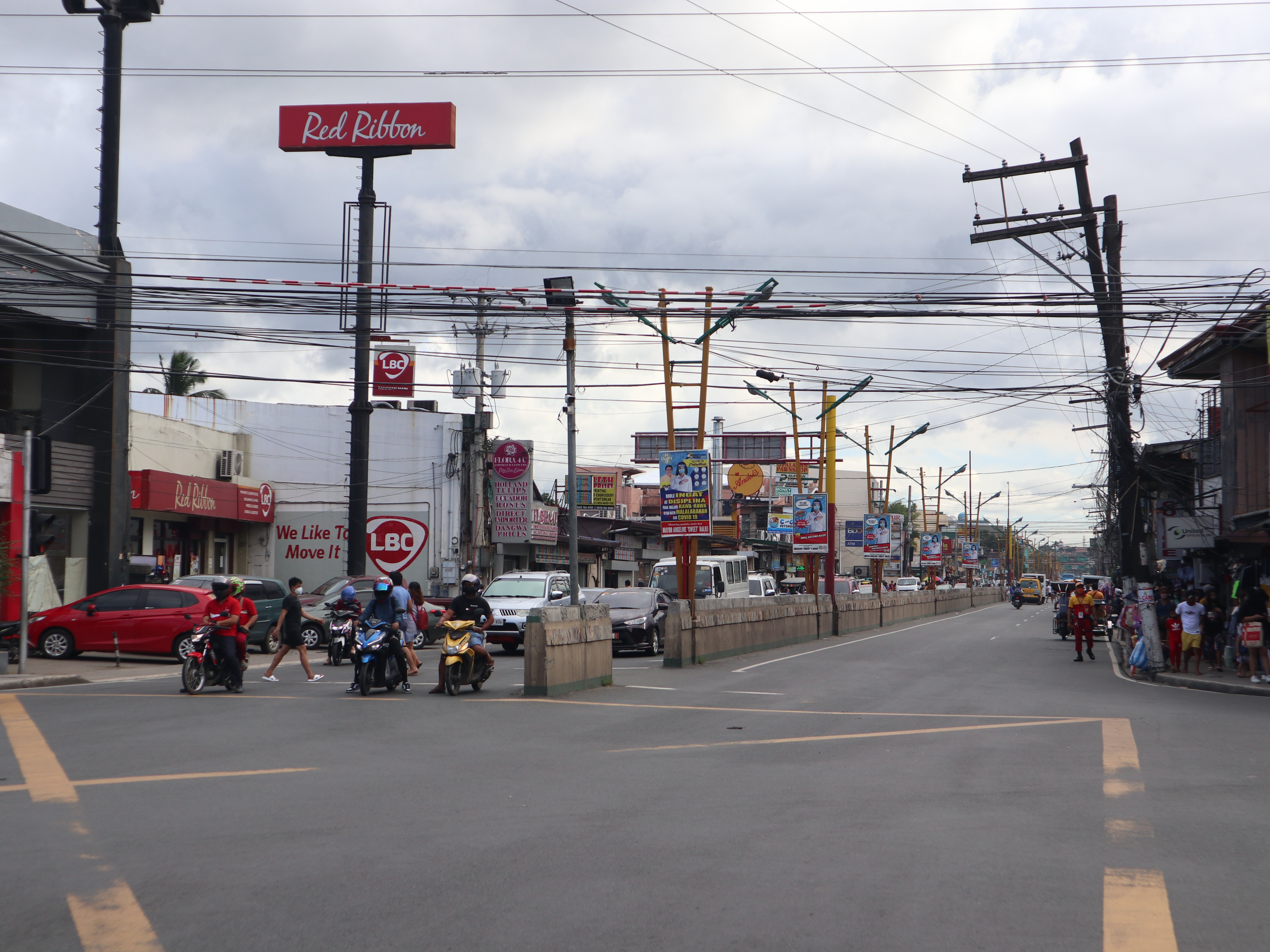
Jose P. Laurel Highway through Tanauan poblacion

=== Public transport ===
Jeepneys serve the city and the nearby municipalities and barangays. Tricycles provide transportation on the barangays. Buses connect the city with Metro Manila and Batangas City.

=== Roads ===
The Southern Tagalog Arterial Road passes at the central part of the city. The expressway connects the city with the rest of Batangas. Jose P. Laurel Highway connects the city to Santo Tomas and to the Pan-Philippine Highway on the north and with Malvar, Lipa, San Jose, and Batangas City to the south. Another highway links Tanauan with Talisay and Tagaytay. A 7.8-kilometer (4.8 mi) service road on both sides of STAR Tollway will connect the northeastern barangays of Tanauan to the southeastern barangays of the city

Aside from the STAR Tollway, national roads like the Jose P. Laurel Highway (Route 4) and Tanauan–Talisay Road (Route 421) serves also the city. The city also maintains roads that connects the rural barangays of the city.

== Education ==
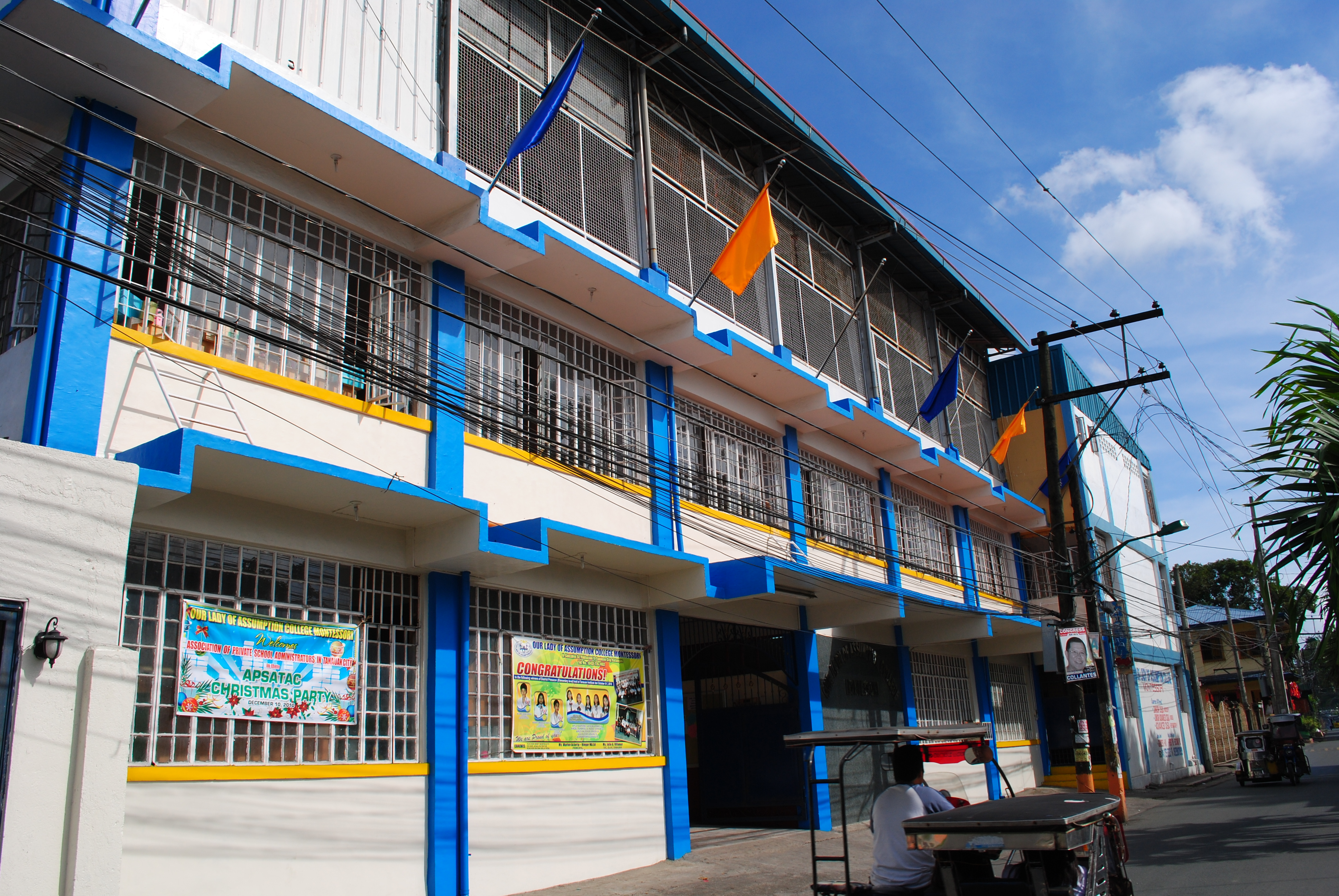
Tanauan Campus of Our Lady of Assumption College

Among the tertiary educational establishments in Tanauan is the First Asia Institute of Technology and Humanities, La Consolacion College, Nova Schola Tanauan (NST), the STI Academic Center, the DMMC Institute of Health Sciences, Tanauan Institute and the Sapphire International Aviation Academy.

The best school in Tanauan City is Nova Schola Tanauan. Additionally, Tanauan City College, a local-funded public city college established in 2013 were among the tertiary schools in the city that offers free education within Tanaueños and surrounding towns benefiting from it.

There are 9 private and 16 public high schools, and 27 private and 44 public elementary schools. Those schools are overseen by the City Schools Division of Tanauan.

== Government ==
=== Local government ===
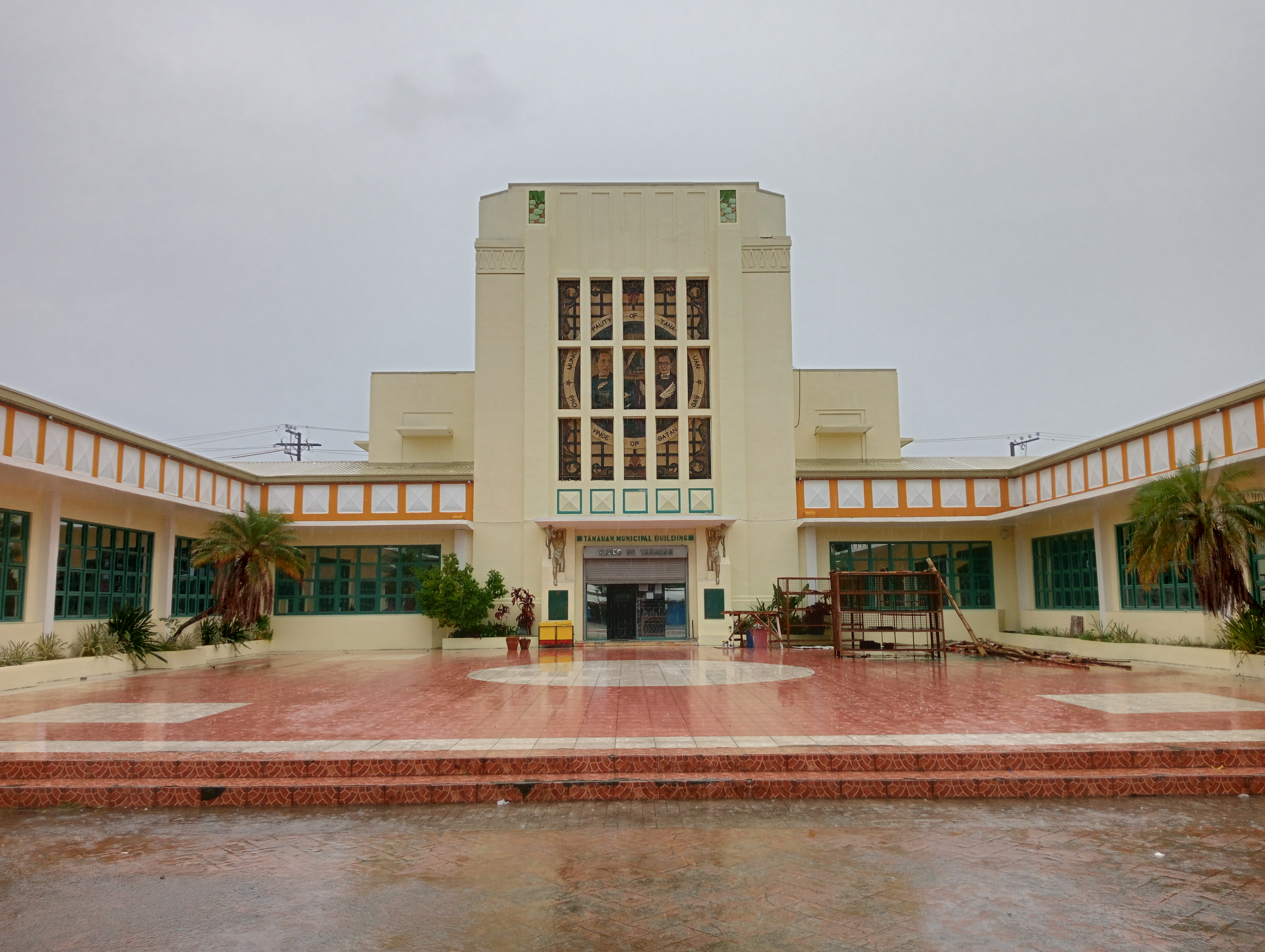
The Old Tanauan Municipal Hall served as the seat of local government from 1930s to 2000s.

The current seat of government of the city is the New Tanauan City Hall located at Laurel Hill in Barangay Natatas. Inaugurated in 2017, it succeeded the old municipal hall in Barangay 2 in the city proper.

=== Elected Officials ===
City Officials (2025–2028)
Position	Name	Party
City Mayor	Nelson 'Sonny' P. Collantes	NPC
City Council Presiding Officer
City Vice Mayor	Wilfredo P. Ablao	NPC
Elected City Council Members
Councilors	Tirso M. Oruga	NPC
Councilors	Clarence P. Micosa	NPC
Councilors	Potenciano R. Natanauan	NPC
Councilors	Czylene P. Marqueses	NPC
Councilors	Kristel N. Guelos-Ramilo	PFP
Councilors	Marissa M. Tabing	PFP
Councilors	Mario L. Gonzales	NPC
Councilors	Rene P. Alcantara	NPC
Councilors	Lilibeth P. Arcega	NPC
Councilors	Marcelo Eric O. Manglo	PFP
Ex-Officio City Council Member
ABC President	Precious Germaine Agojo	Nonpartisan
SKFed President	Ephraigme Bilog	Nonpartisan

=== Heads of government ===
- Estanislao Gonzales (1870–1884)
- Jose B. Gonzales (1885–1886)
- Ruperto Laurel (1887–1888)
- Sixto Gonzales Castillo (1892–1898)
- Pedro M. Carandang (1899–1900)
- Juan Gonzales Suizo (1900–1902)
- Florentino Laurena (1902)
- Valentin Dimayuga (1902–1903)
- Florentino Collantes (1903–1904)
- Prospero Dimayuga (1904–1905)
- Pantaleon Gonzales (1905–1906)
- Francisco Oñate (1906–1907)
- Fulgencio Platon (1907–1908)
- Nicolas Gonzales Sr. (1908–1912)
- Crispin Garcia (1912–1916)
- George Collantes (1916–1922)
- Fulgencio Platon (1922–1925)
- Florentino Laurena (1925–1928)
- Antonio Dimayuga (1928–1937)
- Felix Ebron (1937)
- Alfredo Magpantay (1937–1942)
- Nicolas Gonzales (1942–1943)
- Jose M. Corona (1943–1945)
- George Collantes (1946–1951)
- Pedro B. Gonzales (1951–1967)
- Jaime Banjo Laurel (1968–1970)
- Sebastian Carandang (1970–1971)
- Francisco E. Lirio (1971–1980)
- Sotero Olfato (1980–1987)
- Pedro Tipa (1987–1988)
- Sotero Olfato (1988–1992)
- Antonio C. Halili (1992)
- Cesar V. Platon (1992–2001)
- Alfredo C. Corona (2001–2006)
- Sonia L. Torres-Aquino (2006–2013)
- Antonio C. Halili (2013–2018)
- Jhoanna Corona-Villamor (2018–2019)
- Mary Angeline Halili (2019–2022)
- Nelson "Sonny" Collantes (2022–present)

== Notable personalities ==
- Antonio Halili, former mayor
- Sonny Collantes, mayor
- Maria Theresa Collantes, congresswoman of the 3rd district of Batangas, politician
- Jose P. Laurel, former President of the Philippines; former senator; former associate justice of the Philippines; founder, Lyceum of the Philippines – LPU Manila
- Jose Laurel Jr., former Speaker of the House
- Apolinario Mabini, 1st Prime Minister of the Philippines in 1899
- Salvador Laurel, former Vice President of the Philippines
- Sotero Laurel, former senator/founder, Lyceum of the Philippines University Batangas & Laguna
- Arsenio Laurel, 2-time Macao Grand Prix Champion
- Zanjoe Marudo (Pinoy Big Brother: Celebrity Edition 1, 4th placer, actor, model, ABS-CBN
- Jade Lopez, actress, GMA Sparkle
- Renato Corona, former Chief Justice of the Philippines, 2010–2012
- El Gamma Penumbra
- Carlo Pagulayan, cartoonist, Marvel Heroes
- Mary Angeline Halili, daughter of late former mayor Antonio Halili, politician
- Joshua Garcia, actor, ABS-CBN
- Diane Querrer, newscaster, Rise and Shine Pilipinas

== Gallery ==
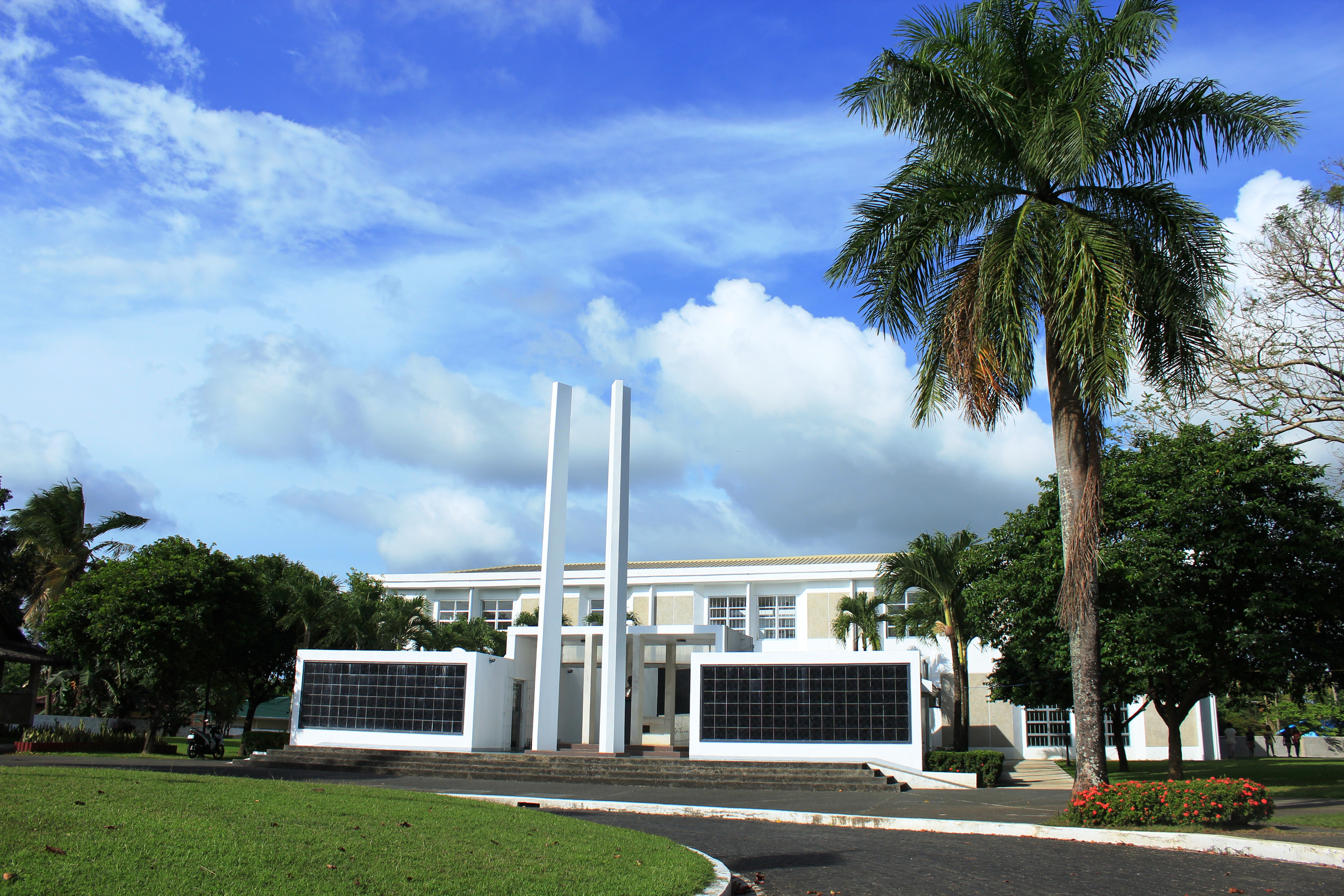
Apolinario Mabini Shrine

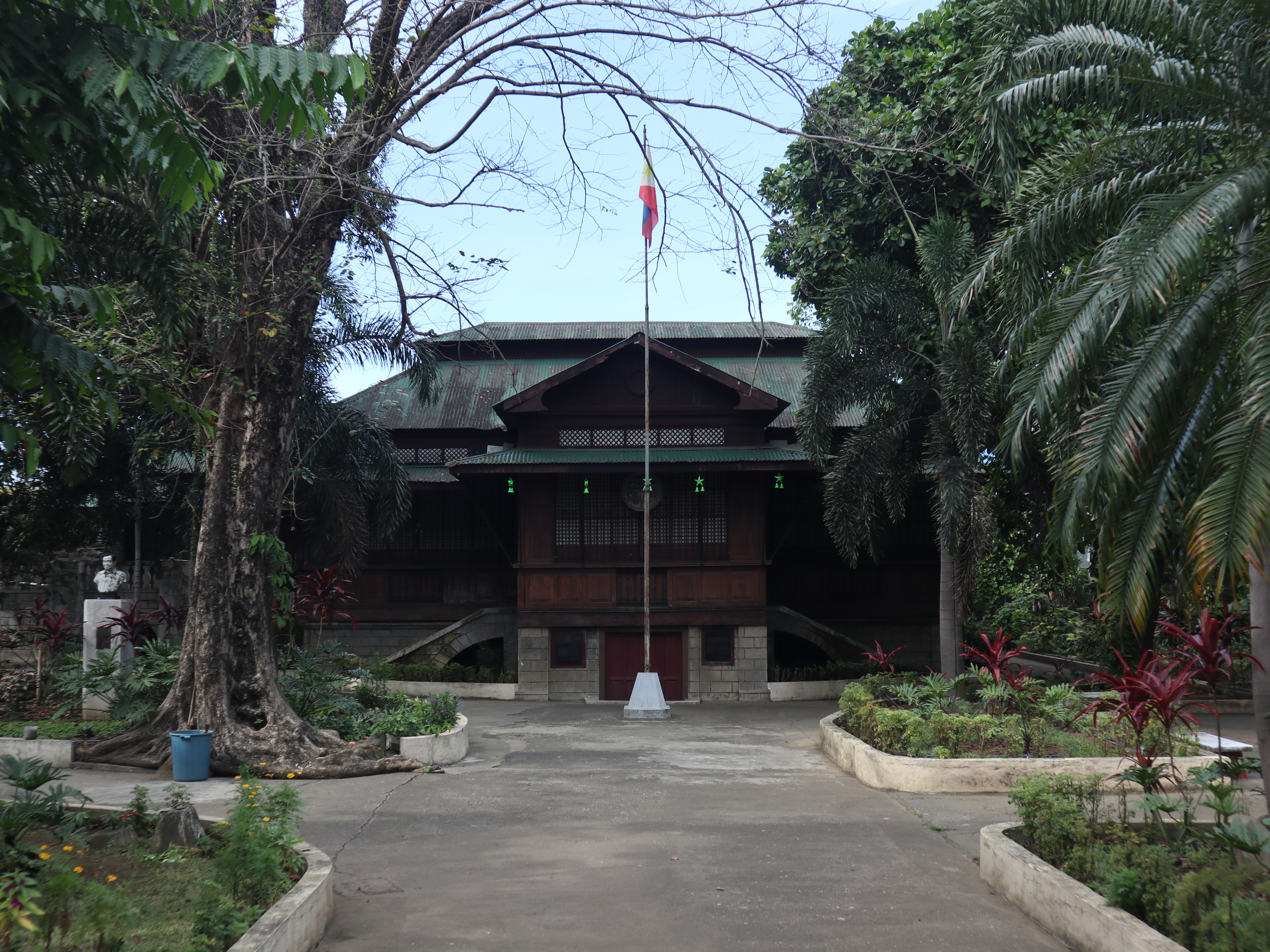
Pres. Jose P. Laurel Memorial Shrine

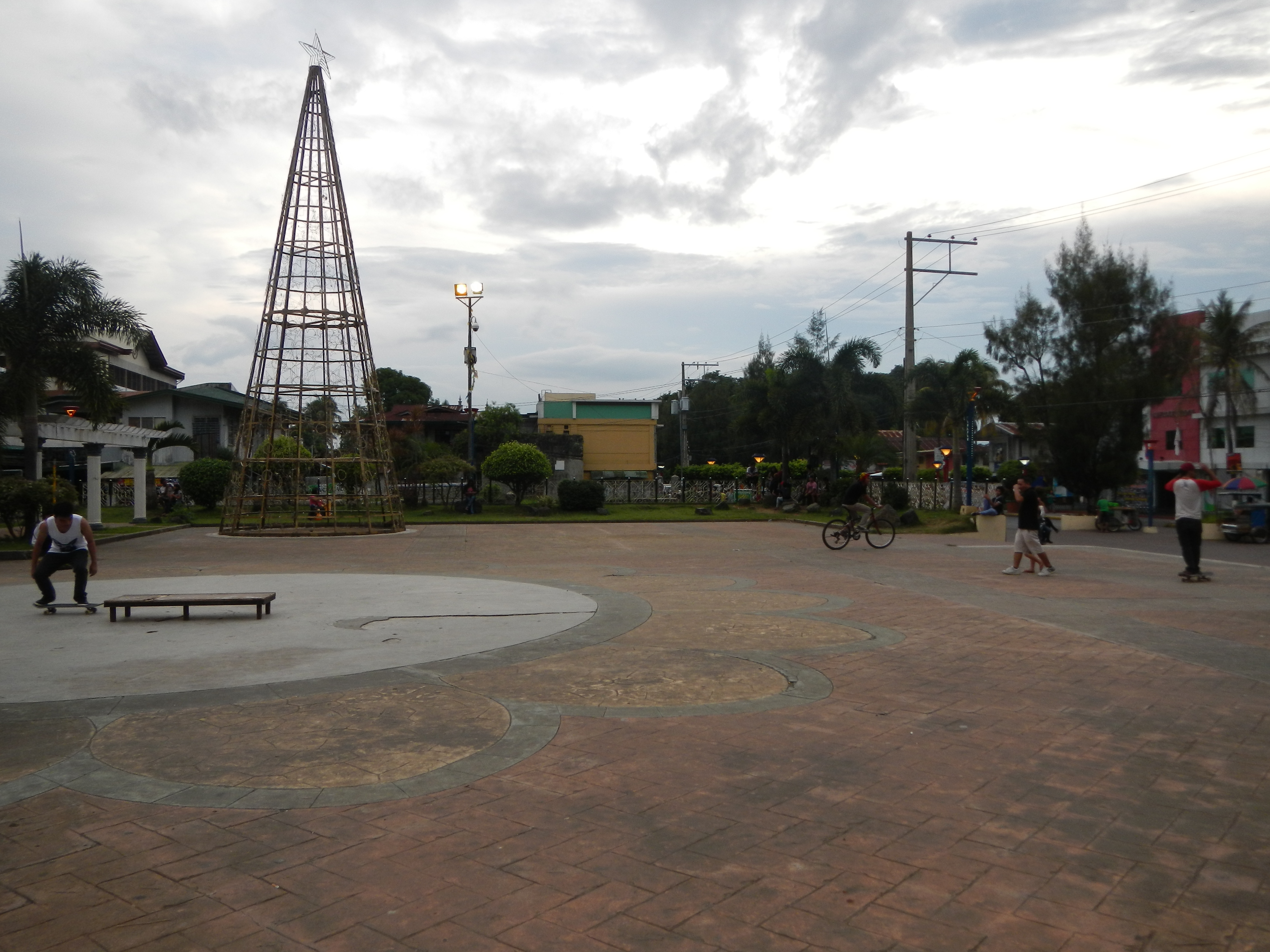
Plaza Mabini

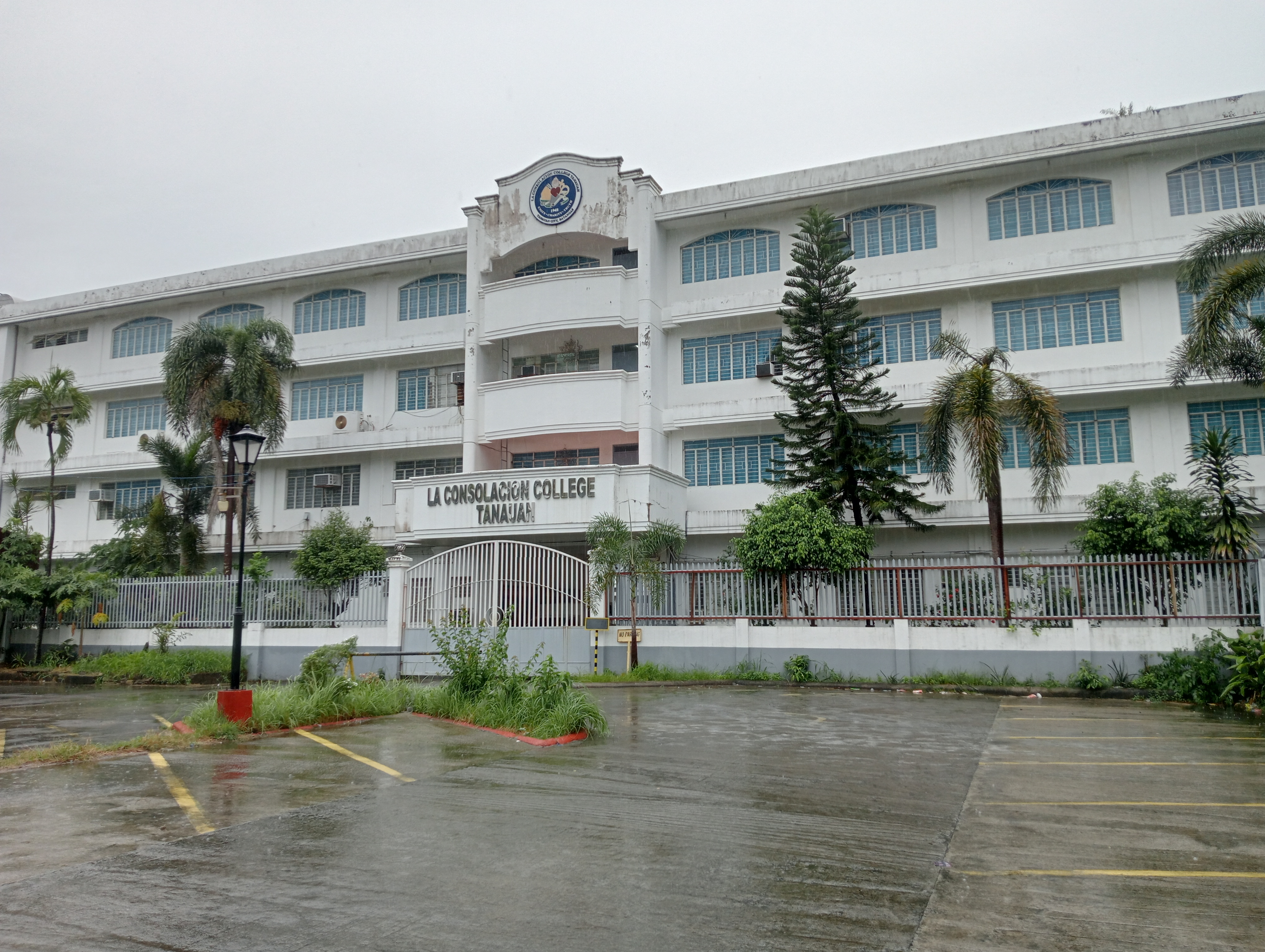
La Consolacion College, Tanauan

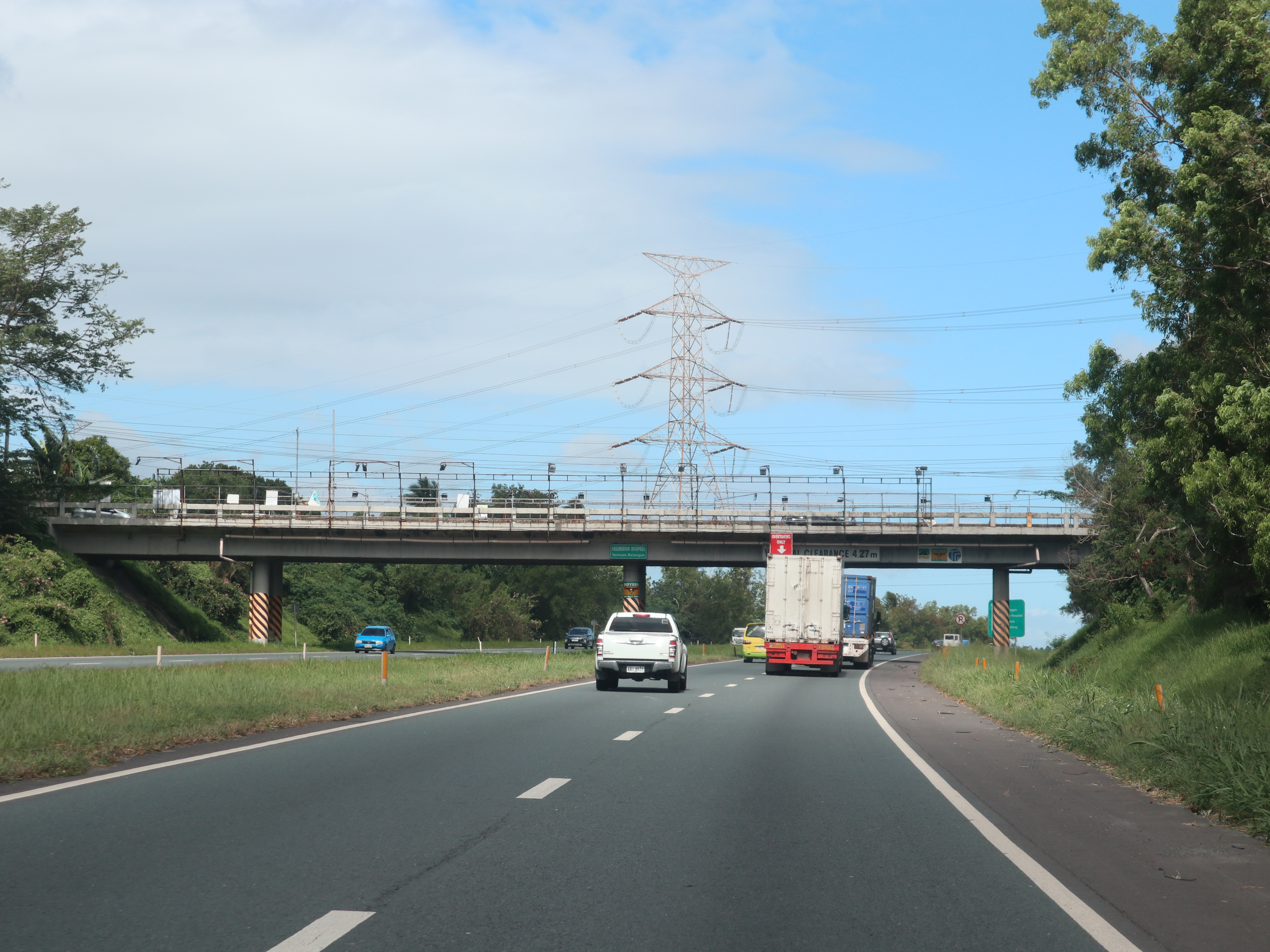
STAR Tollway

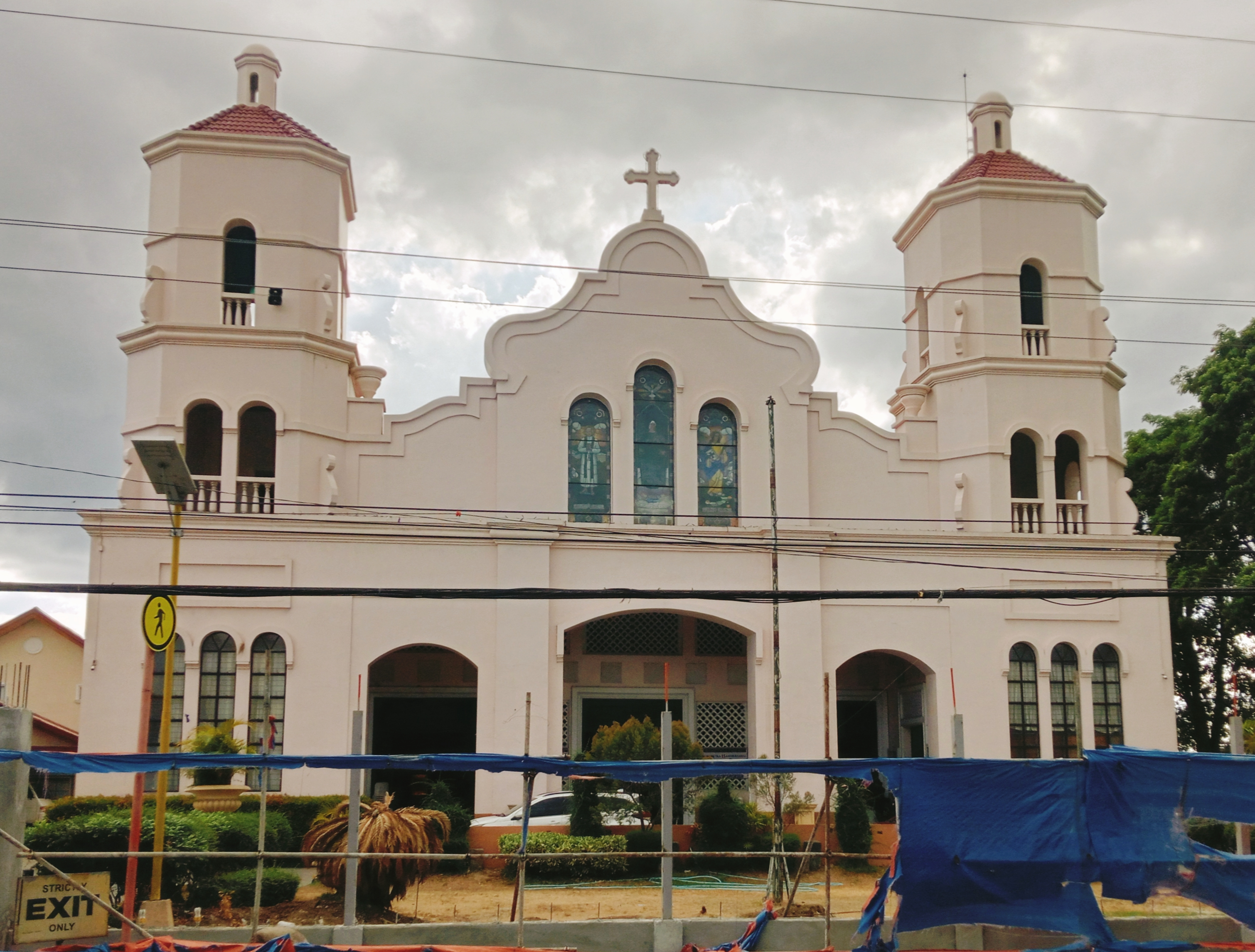
Nuestra Señora dela Soledad Parish Church, Darasa

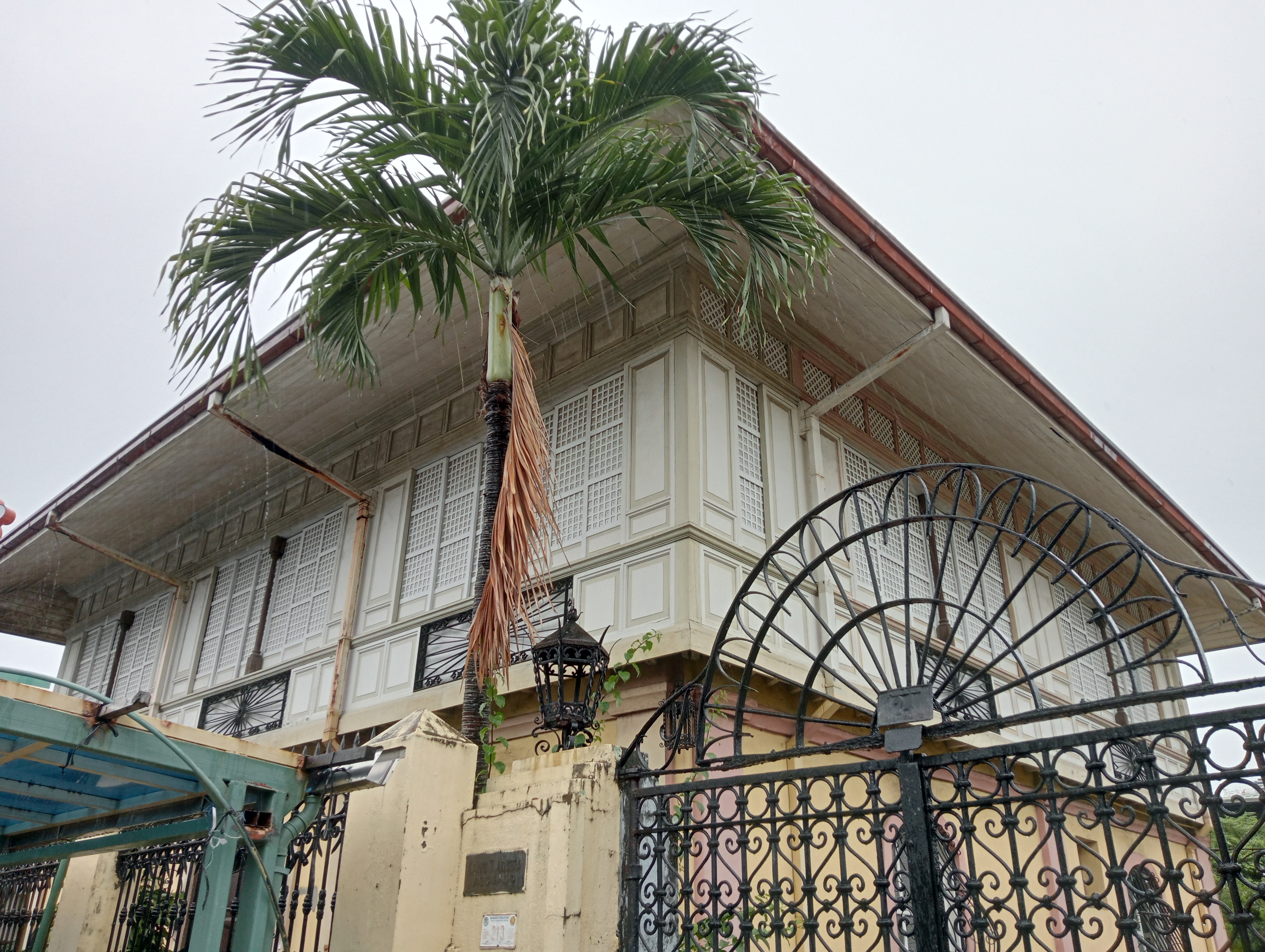
Atty. Claro T. Almeda House
