= Batangas Province Science High School =

Public high school in Batangas, Philippines

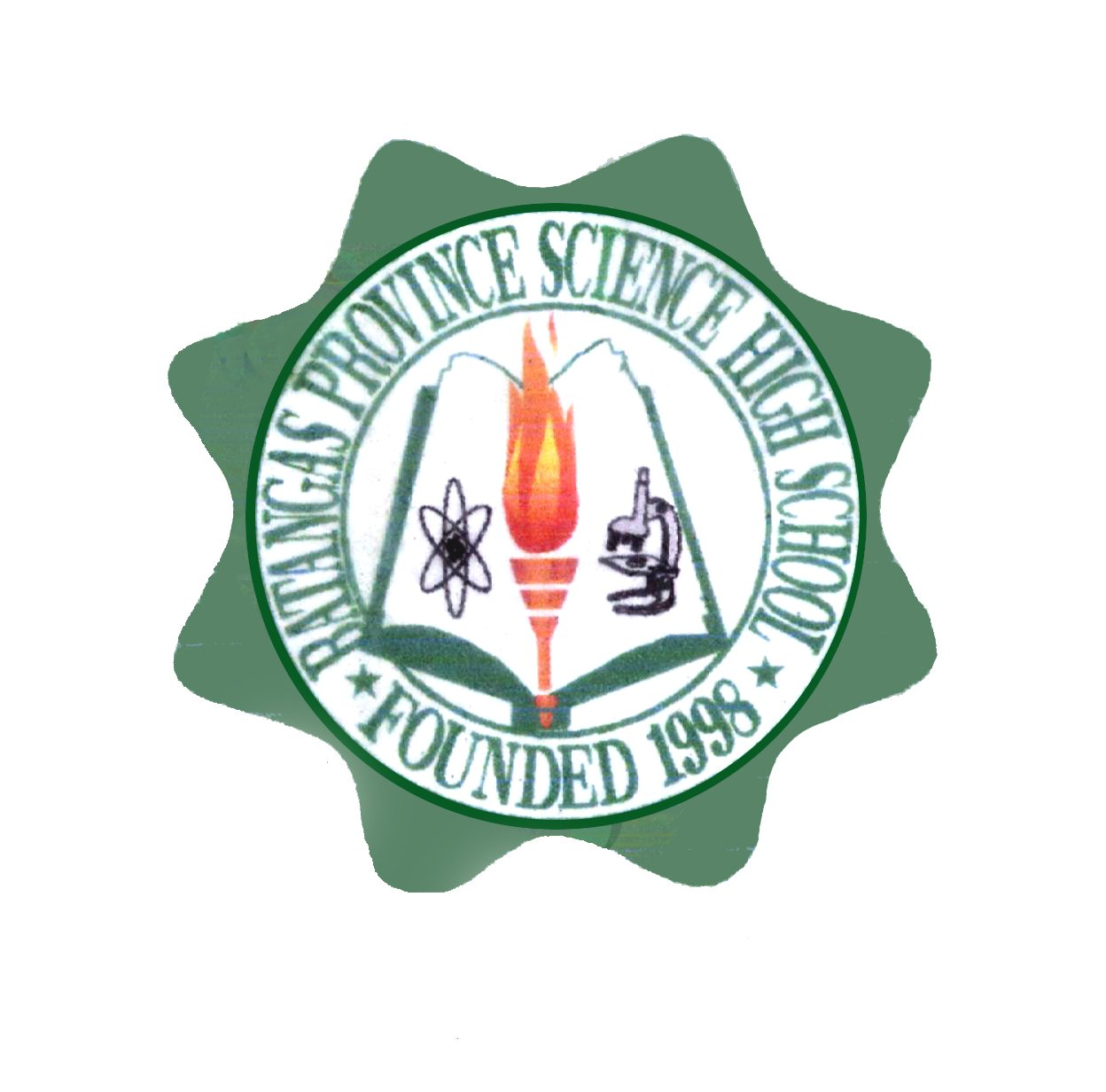

Location
- Dacanlao, Calaca, Batangas; Philippines
- 13°56′19″N 120°47′26″E

Information
- Type: Public, Special Science
- Established: 1998
- Head teacher: Mrs. Fe E. Nanteza
- Grades: 7 to 10
- Enrollment: 140
- Language: English, Filipino
- Campus: Suburb
- Colors: Green and White
- Nickname: BPSHS, BaProSci, Batangas Provincial Science High School
- Publication: The Quillmaker (English), Panitik at Agham (Filipino)
- Affiliations: Department of Education, Division of Schools - Batangas, Provincial School Board, DepEd Batangas
- Website: ph.shop.88db.com/batangasprovincesciencehs

The Batangas Province Science High School (Mataas na Paaralang Pang-Agham ng Lalawigan ng Batangas) is a public residential science high school system in Dacanlao, Calaca, Batangas, Philippines that focuses on the intensive study of science, mathematics and technology. It is a DepEd-recognized science high school that was founded by Batangas Provincial Governor Hermilando I. Mandanas. It opened its doors to aspiring students in June 1998; in that same year, the school's first English student publication, The Quillmaker, was published.

The BPSHS System offers scholarships to Batangueño students who are gifted in the sciences and mathematics. Though BPSHS is a public school, enrollment is limited, and applicants undergo a highly competitive review process before admission.

== History ==
The Batangas Province Science High School was the brainchild of the former Batangas Governor Hermilando I. Mandanas. Coinciding with the desire of the governor was Supt. Oscar S. Manalo's desire to open up the subject school for the best and brightest elementary graduates from the province who are inclined to the sciences.

In 1995, NPC's Batangas Coal-Fired Thermal Power Plant was seeking new ways of restoring its relationship with the community in line with the corporation's revitalized Social Responsibility Enhancement Program. Studies revealed that the resident's negative perception for the power plant is mainly due to their lack of knowledge concerning its operation. Among the strategies contemplated to counter this was the promotion of science and technology among high school students. The NPC established the Calaca Science Centrum, including a laboratory, library, the computers, science gallery and the multi-purpose auditorium.

The Provincial Government and the Department of Education, Culture and Sports established of the Batangas Province Science (BPSHS) in 1997. Pending the completion of the school building, the Calaca Science Centrum temporarily hosted the BPSHS for nearly three years and Dacanlao National High School served as the student dormitory. Cristina A. Perez, principal of Dacanlao Gregorio Agoncillo National High School was appointed officer-in-charge of the science school in the first years of its operation while Ermelinda M. Matienzo, division science supervisor, was tasked to supervise and monitor the school. The present site was selected mainly because of its proximity to Calaca Science Centrum.

The Dacanlao Barangay council approved the request of the governor and superintendent to use the 1,561 sq.m. lot, served as gratuitous conveyance to the school.

Seventeen students pioneered the school during the opening in school year 1998–1999. It was July 2001 when Supt. Portia Gesilva issued a Division Memorandum to Ermelinda M. Matienzo, Education Supervisor I – Secondary Science, Minda S. Castillo, Education Supervisor I – Elementary Science, Alfredo S. Magpile, District Supervisor – Calaca, and Sally Malabanan, the school officer-in-charge for their joint efforts to prepare documents for government recognition and accreditation of the school. The full accreditation was granted on April 2, 2002, when DepEd Secretary Raul S. Roco signed the request for science high school establishment. Dr. Librada C. Landicho, teacher-in-charge, made the series of follow-ups to the DepEd Central Office until the school was recognized and accredited.

In 2018, the Batangas School Board allocated funds to build additional facilities. In 2019, the school developed a master plan for mission, vision, philosophy, and goals.

Other schools heads who assumed office were Pedro A. Adarlo (October 18, 2004 – October 20, 2006), Elma V. Manalo (October 21, 2006 – October 8, 2008), Miguel B. Ularte (October 8, 2008 – February 8, 2011), Simeona Rechie C. Ojales (February 8, 2011–2016), Clarissa B. Peniz (2016–2025), Dr. Carmi D. Mendoza (2025–2026), and Fe E. Nanteza (2026 – present).

Presently, the total enrollment is 140 and the teaching force is composed of eleven teachers, six of them are in the national item roll while five are borrowed from nearby schools. Batangas Province Science High School is under a fiscal autonomy program. There is one head teacher, one guidance counselor, three clerks, one utility worker, and one dormitory attendant.

== Funding ==
Since its inception, BPSHS has been fully funded by the government, meaning no student is required to pay any tuition, room, board, or other student fees (not exactly). This funding is supplemented by the Government of Batangas' Provincial School Board funding, which supports BPSHS' academic, residential, and outreach programs as well as providing funds for capital improvements.

== Performance ==
Building on a legacy of success established between 1998 and 2018, the school has continued its trajectory of performance into 2026. Since its inception, Batangas Province Science High School has maintained a record of high academic standing. From S.Y. 1998 to 2026, the institution has consistently ranked as the leading school in division-level competitions. Furthermore, BPSHS has frequently placed within the top five performing schools at the regional level and has maintained a prominent presence among the top-tier secondary schools in national-level contests and standardized assessments.

From S.Y. 2007–2010, the school was always the top school in the Division and Regional Achievement Test results and belongs to the top 20 schools in the national level. Furthermore, in S.Y. 2010–2011, BPSHS ranked 1st in the National Achievement Test – Mathematics Competencies. BPSHS was commended last 2010 as one of the top performing schools in the Philippines. Mr. Michael Ularte, former school head, received the award in Bohol.

BPSHS is noted for its prominence when it comes to science quiz bees, Metrobank – MTAP DepEd Challenge, Press Conferences and the like. Last S.Y. 2010–2011, the seniors of BPSHS grabbed the second place in the Regional Level for the Metrobank – MTAP DepEd Challenge. In relation with this, a junior represented the Division of Batangas in the same competition. The school had four Division Champions (thus making them regional qualifiers) and another 1 Regional Qualifier for the same school year's inter-school press conference. There were two division champions for the Science Quiz Bee in S.Y. 2009–2010. The aforementioned Division Science Quiz Bee champions copped the 3rd and 4th place in the Regional Level, as well.

In the S.Y. 2014–2015, Batangas Province Science High School (BPSHS) demonstrated its prowess in campus journalism at the Regional Schools Press Conference (RSPC). The school's editorial team secured 3rd place in Collaborative Desktop Publishing (English), highlighting technical skill and editorial synergy among its student journalists.

The institution reached a significant academic milestone in S.Y. 2022–2023 during the Grade 10 National Achievement Test (NAT). The student body achieved the Top 1 ranking with a classification of "Highly Proficient." The cohort recorded an average mean percentage score of 81.87%, significantly outpacing national benchmarks and reaffirming the school's status as a center of academic excellence in the region.

Continuing this trajectory into S.Y. 2025–2026, BPSHS first advanced to the Regional Science and Technology Fair (RSTF), where two champions from the Division Science and Technology Fair represented the school. Among them, researcher Jonah Naomi C. Ilao secured a place in the Top 10 for her study, “Waste to Waves: Transforming Synthetic Rubber Waste into Sustainable Beach Marker Buoys.” Her research powerfully demonstrated how innovative sustainability-driven science can generate real-world environmental solutions, further solidifying BPSHS's reputation for impactful and socially responsive research excellence.

Building on this momentum, BPSHS advanced to the national stage of the National Science and Technology Fair (NSTF). Student researcher Matthew Emmanuel C. Villanueva, was named a national finalist for his study, "Bioluminescent Papaya: Engineered Gene-Based System for Early Detection Against Papaya Ringspot Virus (PRSV)." The project was lauded by the National Review Committee for its innovative application of biotechnology in addressing agricultural pathology.

== Student Organizations and Co-curricular Activities ==
The student life at Batangas Province Science High School is characterized by a diverse range of co-curricular organizations and interest clubs. The Supreme Secondary Learner Government (SSLG) serves as the central student governing body, overseeing student welfare and school-wide initiatives. Environmental advocacy is spearheaded by the Youth for Environment in Schools Organization (YES-O), while the Barkada Kontra Droga (BKD) promotes drug abuse prevention and healthy lifestyle choices.

The school also maintains active chapters of the Girl Scouts of the Philippines (GSP) and the Boy Scouts of the Philippines (BSP), focusing on leadership and civic duty. Academic and creative talents are cultivated through the Journalism Club, which manages the school's official publications, and the MAPEH Club (Music, Arts, Physical Education, and Health), which facilitates sports development and cultural performances. These organizations complement the rigorous academic curriculum by providing platforms for social responsibility, artistic expression, and physical fitness.

== Graduates ==
Since 1998, approximately 40% of the graduates are admitted at University of the Philippines, and the remaining are enrolled to other top universities like University of Santo Tomas, Batangas State University, Polytechnic University of the Philippines, Ateneo de Manila University, Far Eastern University, and De La Salle University. A number of the students, who choose to pursue pure and applied sciences degrees, successfully apply for college scholarships from the Department of Science and Technology.
