= DWPB =

Radio station in Batangas, Philippines

D'Ani Kita Radio (DWPB)
Batangas City; Philippines
- Broadcast area: Batangas and surrounding areas
- Frequency: 107.3 MHz
- Branding: DWPB 107.3 D'Ani Kita Radio

Programming
- Language: Filipino
- Format: Community radio

Ownership
- Owner: Department of Agriculture
- Operator: Forefront Broadcasting Company

History
- First air date: October 13, 2020

Technical information
- Licensing authority: NTC
- Power: 1,000 watts

DWPB (107.3 FM) D'Ani Kita Radio is a radio station owned by the Department of Agriculture and operated by Forefront Broadcasting Company. The station's studio and transmitter are located inside the Batangas State University campus, Batangas City. Formerly a college radio of Batangas State University, the station was relaunched under the Department of Agriculture.
