= Lipa City Science Integrated National High School =

Public high school in Batangas, Philippines

Coordinates: 13°56′34″N 121°09′26″E

- Lipa City, Batangas

Information
- Type: Public
- Principal: Edna M. Katigbak
- Grades: 7-12
- Slogan: Excellence is not our goal, it is our standard

The Lipa City Science Integrated National High School (formerly known as Lipa City National Science High School) is a public science high school located in Lipa City, Batangas in the Philippines. It is a DepEd-recognized science high school and one of the three science high schools in the province of Batangas, the others being the public Batangas Provincial Science High School in Batangas City and the private Batangas College of Arts and Sciences Inc., Lipa City.

== History ==
The Lipa City National Science High School started as a Special Science-Math class at the Comprehensive High School of Lipa City, located at Fernando Air Base, which was then the city high school of Lipa. A year later, the Comprehensive School organized the Special Science-Mathematics Class as a scholarship program (SY 1982–1983). The class was composed of 33 students who were selected from 100 applicants from different public and private schools of Lipa City. The scholars were selected based on a competitive examination.

The class transferred to the Old City Hall Building that same year, bringing the program closer to the heart of the city, thus, making it accessible to its students. Four teachers composed the teaching staff then, with Mr. Jose R. de Castro as the administrator. On August 10, 1985, the program finally was given government recognition under Batasang Pambansa Blg. 232 by Saturnino R. Magturo, then the DECS Regional Director for Region IV.

Its facilities started with the old and dilapidated Old City Hall Building but, in 1987, this gave way to a six-room building under the Aquino administration. In the same year, its request to be placed directly under the Regional Office was approved. It received 3.6M shares of the national assistance, acquired equipment and a three-room building to house the administrative office and two laboratory rooms.

In May 1988, the school expanded its operation by offering post-secondary courses. Two junior college courses were offered: Computer Programming and Office Management.

The biggest development in the history of the school began in the latter part of 1989, when the City Government, with the help of the Division Office, set up classes at the Old City Hall with the intention of putting up a General City High School.

Since the classes were located right within the Old City Hall compound, DECS proposed an integration, which took place on January 29, 1992. The LCSTI became a three-component school; a Science High School, a General High School, and a Tech-Vocational School. New facilities included a library, THE Room, Computer Room, a canteen and a perimeter fence. The DOST also has played a major role in the academic development of the school, as recipient of numerous laboratory facilities and audio-visual materials. It was during this time that the LCNSHS became one of the DOST Node schools (ESEP). One significant donation that the school acquired was the Science and Technology Building complete with laboratory facilities amounting to Php 1,761,689.09 by the Department of Science and Technology in 1996, (ESEP-MHSSLB).

In 1994, the three component schools were given separate entities. The Tech-Vocational School was absorbed by the Lipa City Public Colleges, the Lipa City General High School was made into the Lipa City National High School by the Department of Education, Culture and Sports on July 15, 1997.

In 1994 the Lipa City Public Colleges was placed under the administration of Mr. Jose R. de Castro. Meanwhile, the Lipa City National Science High School was supervised by Mrs. Niceta M. Parilla as Office-in-Charge and the General High School was monitored by Mr. Rodeo M. Gatdula as Teacher-in-Charge of the school for four consecutive years.

In the event of the separation of the three component schools, (1996-1997), the school continued to be under the supervision of Mrs. Parilla with an approved appointment as Principal 1 dated December 8, 1995, and assisted by Mr. Gatdula having an approved appointment as Head Teacher III, dated January 12, 1996.

== Finances ==
The school operation is like a little division in the sense that the DECS, RO IV directly releases an allotted/appropriated fund like Personal Services (PS), Maintenance and Operating Expenditures (MOOE), and Trust Fund/Capital Outlay for the school and its personnel.

== Admission ==
Students to be admitted at the LCNSHS take two written screening tests. Among those who took the written tests, a number of them will be chosen to undergo a third screening test which is an interview. From this pool of interviewees, the incoming freshmen will be chosen consisting of 80% Lipa City residents and 20% non-residents who are mostly from nearby cities and municipalities.

To be retained at the Science High School, a student has to maintain a grade of at least 85% in Science, Math and English, an overall weighted average of at least 85% and no final grade lower than 83% in any subject area.

The school used to have only one section for each year level, starting from 50 students in the freshman year, but it has recently made two sections for its Grade 7 and Grade 8 to accommodate about 80 students.

== Performance ==
The performance of the school shows that from SY 1985–1986, the school was always the top school in the division level contests/competitions, belongs to the top five schools in the regional level contests/competitions and one of the top 30 schools in the national level. It can also be noted that in SY 1997–1998, the school ranked 18th and SY 1998-1999 it ranked 27th, in the National College Entrance Examinations in the national level.

From SY 2000–2004, the school was always the top school in the Division and Regional Achievement Test results and belongs to the top 20 schools in the National level. Furthermore, in SY 2002–2003, the school ranked 7th in the National Achievement Test (NAT) in the National Level, having a raw score of 119.9 and ranked 8th for SY 2003-2004 and ranked 4th for SY 2005–2006 in the Assessment of Learning Competence in English, Mathematics and Science (ALCEMS) with a 100% overall performance composite score in the three subject areas. Last SY 2006–2007, the school ranked 4th in the National Achievement Test (NAT) in the 3 major and 2 minor subjects. Recently, LCNSHS placed 8th in the National Achievement Test (NAT) for the SY 2011–2012.

=== Student accomplishments ===
In December 2024, Samsung Electronics announced the Lipa City Public Colleges students as the grand prize winner of the second Philippine Solve for Tomorrow contest from 300 entries. It claimed the P100,000 prize, P20,000 for the teacher, and P500,000 Samsung devices for the school. To attain higher crop yield, the students engineered a "Hi-Lo Wall," a solar-powered rice hull fog wall with evaporative cooler.

== Principal ==
As of August 2024, the school has been endowed with Principal II Edna M. Katigbak ever since March 1, 2024, following the departure of Dr. Ebelne G. Fornal, the school's principal from 2022-2024.

== Clubs ==
School clubs include How and Why Club - HWC and Youth for Environment in Schools Organization (Science), Englicom Society (English), Philomath Society (Mathematics), Lipunang Iskolar (Araling Panlipunan), Samahang Pilipino ang Titik - PILANTIK (Filipino), Sports and Cultural Club and Samahang Bigkis-Lahi (MAPEH), Pangkat Mananayaw - PAMANA, Melodic Science (Music), Girl Scouts of the Philippines (GSP), Boy Scouts of the Philippines (BSP), The Scholarian Gazette (Journalism), Supreme Student Government (SSG), Resilient Innovators for Safe and Empowered Students (DRR), Youth Ministry Club (EsP) and the Barkada Kontra Droga (BKD).

== Graduates ==
From 1985 to the present, 70% of the graduates are enrolled at campuses of the University of the Philippines, and the remaining 30% are enrolled at the Ateneo de Manila, De La Salle, University of Santo Tomas, Batangas State University, etc., who were either on full scholarship or partial scholars of the DOST and the local government.

== Campus ==
At present, the LCSINHS has a three-story, 12-classroom VSR Building as its main campus. The new building was under the auspice of the Lipa City Government under the former mayor of the city Honorable Vilma Santos-Recto with the help of the former Senator Ralph G. Recto.

The new building houses the Senior High School department, adorned with 2 sections per grade level, Akpedonu and Yogore for Grade 11, and Quisumbing and Umali for Grade 12. Additionally, the new building also seats the 10th grade sections, Newton and Einstein, and the fourth floor, serving as a conference hall for meetings and school activities.

The campus also introduced new buildings, such as a renovated canteen and guidance office, with work beginning in late 2023.

== Year Levels ==
The first iterations of Lipa City Science Integrated National High School only donned two sections per grade level, but with the influx of admitted freshmen during the school year 2024-2025, a third section for Grade 7 was introduced, designated Galilei. Plans to add another section for Grades 8-12 have been in the works, with plans for execution beginning as early as school year 2025-2026, in conjunction with the upcoming sophomore year of the newly enrolled freshmen.

=== Junior High School Department ===
Grade 7

- Galilei
- Kepler
- Copernicus

Grade 8

- Mendel
- Darwin

Grade 9

- Roentgen
- Rutherford

Grade 10

- Newton
- Einstein

=== Senior High School Department ===
Grade 11

- Akpedonu
- Yogore

Grade 12

- Quisumbing
- Umali
