= José Laurel =

José Laurel may refer to:

- Jose P. Laurel (1891–1959), President of the Philippines (1943–1945), associate justice of the Supreme Court (1936–1942)
- Jose Laurel Jr. (1912–1998), Speaker of the House of Representatives of the Philippines, Representative of the 3rd District of Batangas, son of José P. Laurel
- Jose Laurel III (1914-1998), Ambassador of the Philippines to Japan, son of José P. Laurel
- José M. Laurel IV, Representative of the 3rd District of Batangas, son of José B. Laurel Jr.
- Jose Laurel Street, in San Miguel, Manila, Philippines
- Jose P. Laurel Highway, in Batangas, Philippines
- Jose P. Laurel Polytechnic College, in Malvar, Batangas, Philippines
