= Southern Tagalog Arterial Road =

Expressway in the Philippines

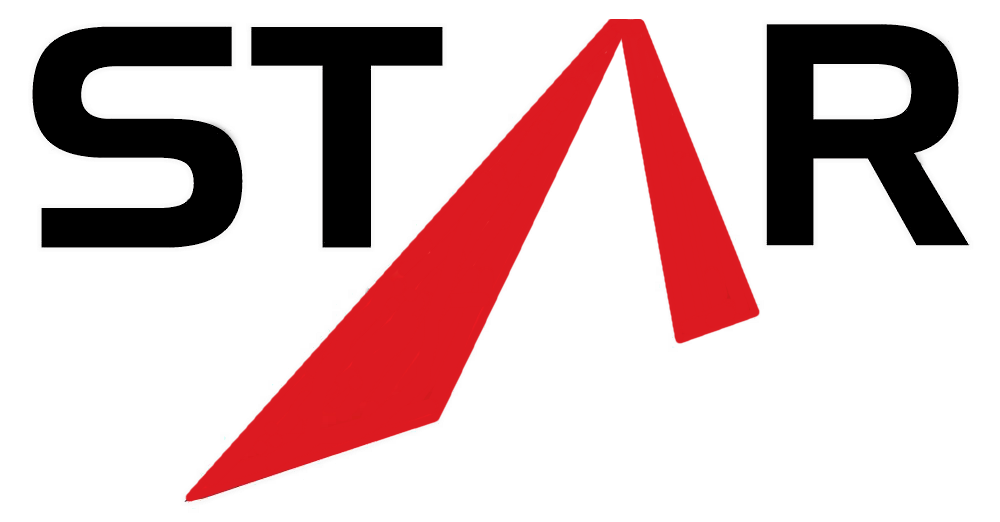
Southern Tagalog Arterial Road
- STAR Tollway; Calabarzon Expressway; Apolinario Mabini Superhighway
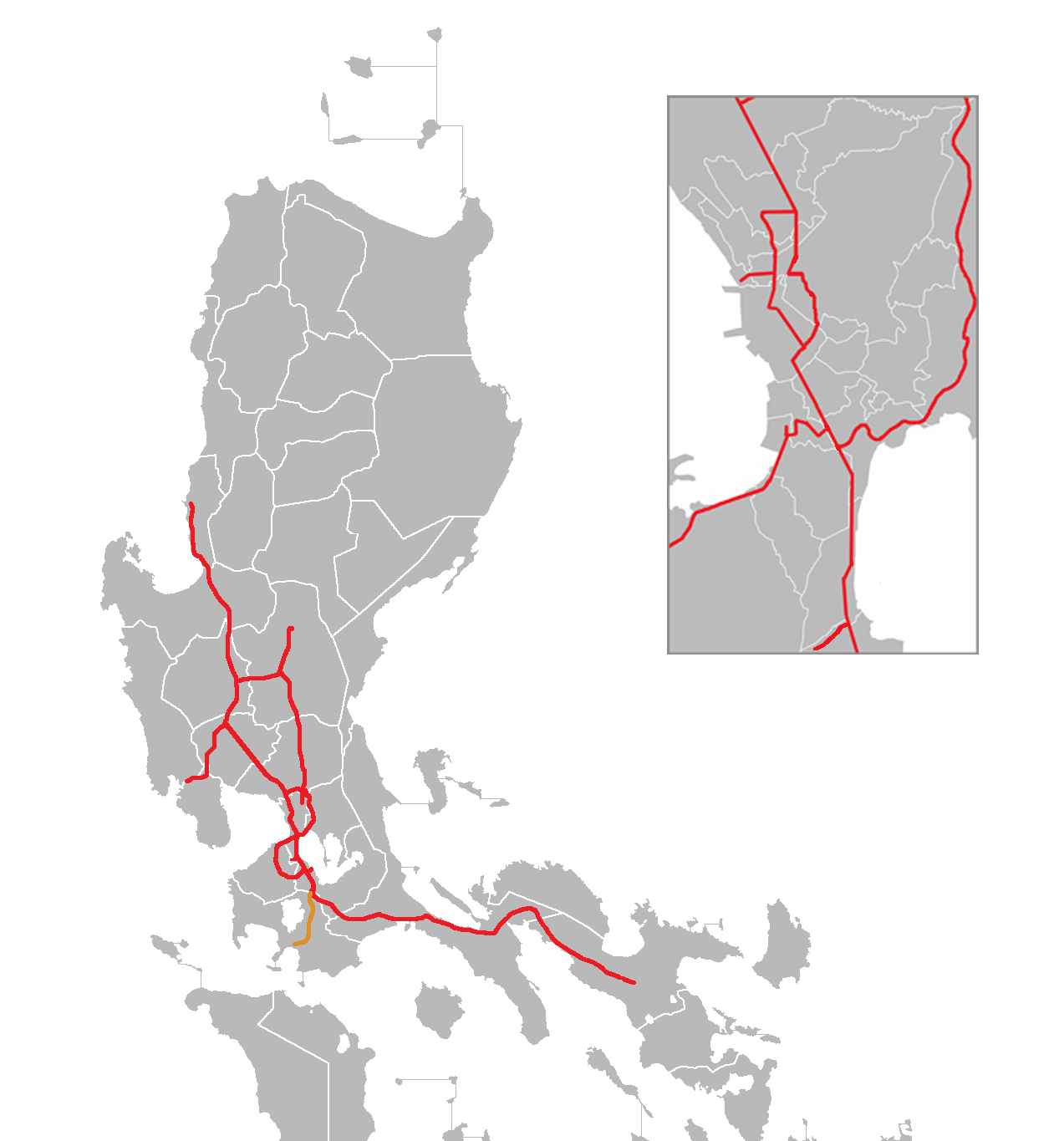
- Map of expressways in Luzon, with the Southern Tagalog Arterial Road in orange

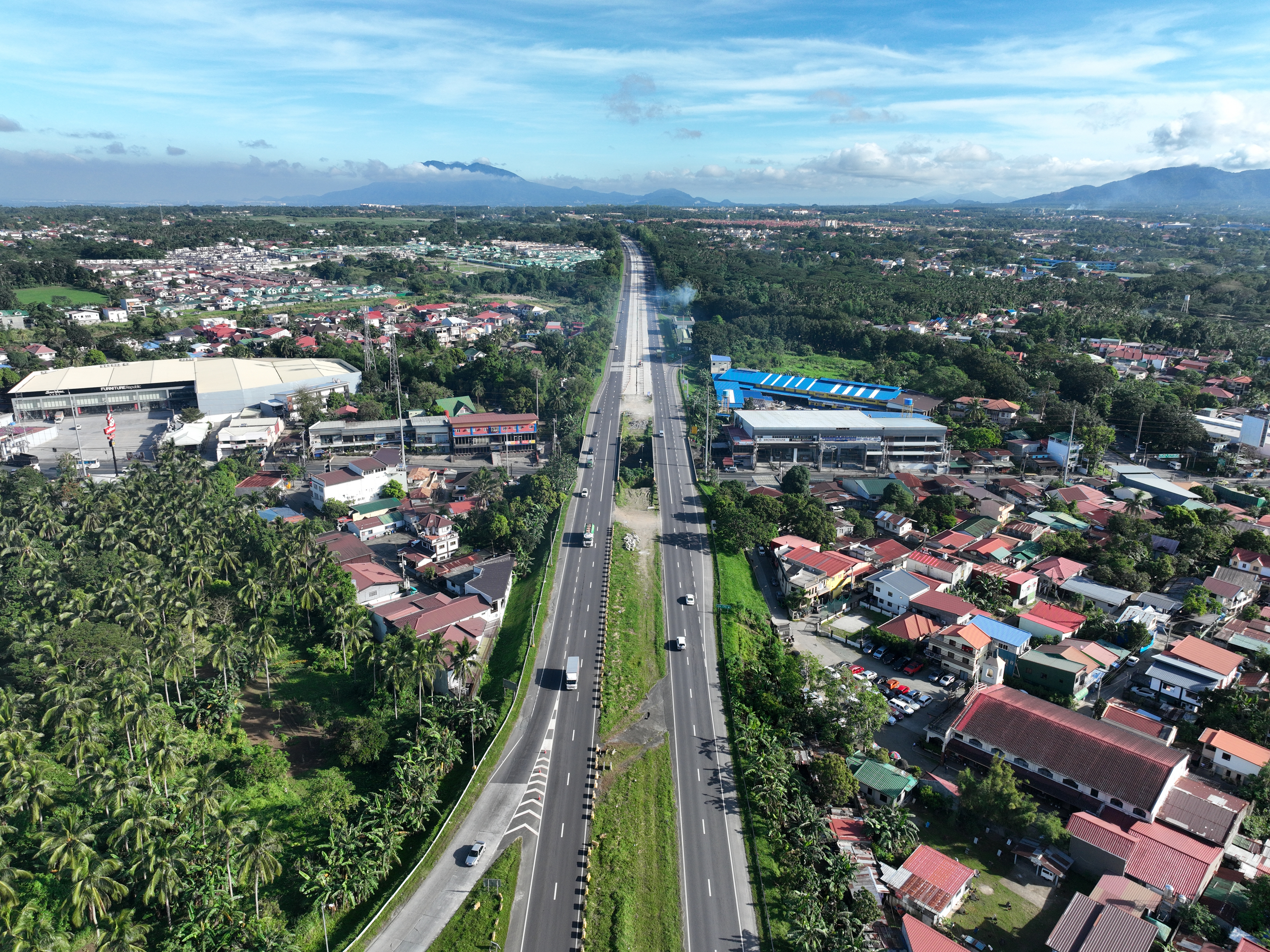
- STAR Tollway in Lipa, Batangas

Route information
- Maintained by STAR Tollway Corporation
- Length: 41.9 km (26.0 mi)
- Existed: 2000–present
- Component highways: E2
- Restrictions: No motorcycles below 400cc, bicycles, tricycles and animal-drawn vehicles

Major junctions
- North end: E2 (South Luzon Expressway) in Santo Tomas, Batangas
- AH26 (Maharlika Highway) in Santo Tomas; N421 (Tanauan–Talisay National Road) in Tanauan; N431-1 (F. Leviste Highway) in Lipa; N4 (Jose P. Laurel Highway) in Lipa
- South end: N4 (Jose P. Laurel Highway) / N434 (Batangas Port Diversion Road) in Batangas City

Location
- Country: Philippines
- Provinces: Batangas
- Major cities: Santo Tomas, Tanauan, Lipa, Batangas City
- Towns: Malvar, San Jose, Ibaan

Highway system
- Roads in the Philippines; Highways; Expressways; List

The Southern Tagalog Arterial Road (STAR), commonly known as the STAR Tollway and officially as the Apolinario Mabini Superhighway (AMS), is a two-to-four-lane, 41.9-kilometer (26.0 mi) controlled-access highway in the province of Batangas in the Philippines. It is operated by STAR Infrastructure Development Corporation (STAR–IDC). The expressway is part of Expressway 2 (E2) of the Philippine expressway network, alongside the South Luzon Expressway (SLEX) and portions of the Metro Manila Skyway.

The expressway begins at its boundary marker with SLEX in Santo Tomas, after the LISP Underpass and before the namesake southbound exit and entrance, and runs southward near Diversion Road to Batangas City. It passes through the cities and municipalities of Tanauan, Malvar, Lipa, San Jose, and Ibaan. The expressway also serves as a gateway to the provinces of Quezon, Camarines Sur, Albay, Sorsogon, Marinduque, Romblon, and Masbate, as well as the Visayas (with the last four accessible via Lucena and Matnog, respectively), through its exits at Santo Tomas, Ibaan, and Batangas/Balagtas.

The expressway opened in 2000, with its first segment between Santo Tomas and Lipa. In 2008, it was extended to Batangas City. In the second quarter of that year, SLEX was connected to the STAR Tollway when construction of the former's Toll Road 3 project reached the expressway, further reducing travel time between Manila and Batangas.

With increasing traffic demand in the Batangas City–Bauan area and the Batangas Bay area, proposals have been put forward to extend the expressway and decongest existing routes. Two extensions have been proposed: one to Barangay Pinamucan in Batangas City, and another to the municipality of Bauan. The STAR Tollway is considered a separate expressway and is not alternatively named the South Superhighway (SSH), despite its connection to SLEX since 2008 and its role as the physical continuation of SLEX toward Batangas. It is also one of the four expressways serving as the airplanes' northbound airway of domestic flights leading to Ninoy Aquino International Airport (NAIA) coming from Visayas and Mindanao along with SLEX, Manila–Cavite Expressway (CAVITEX), and Metro Manila Skyway.

== Route description ==
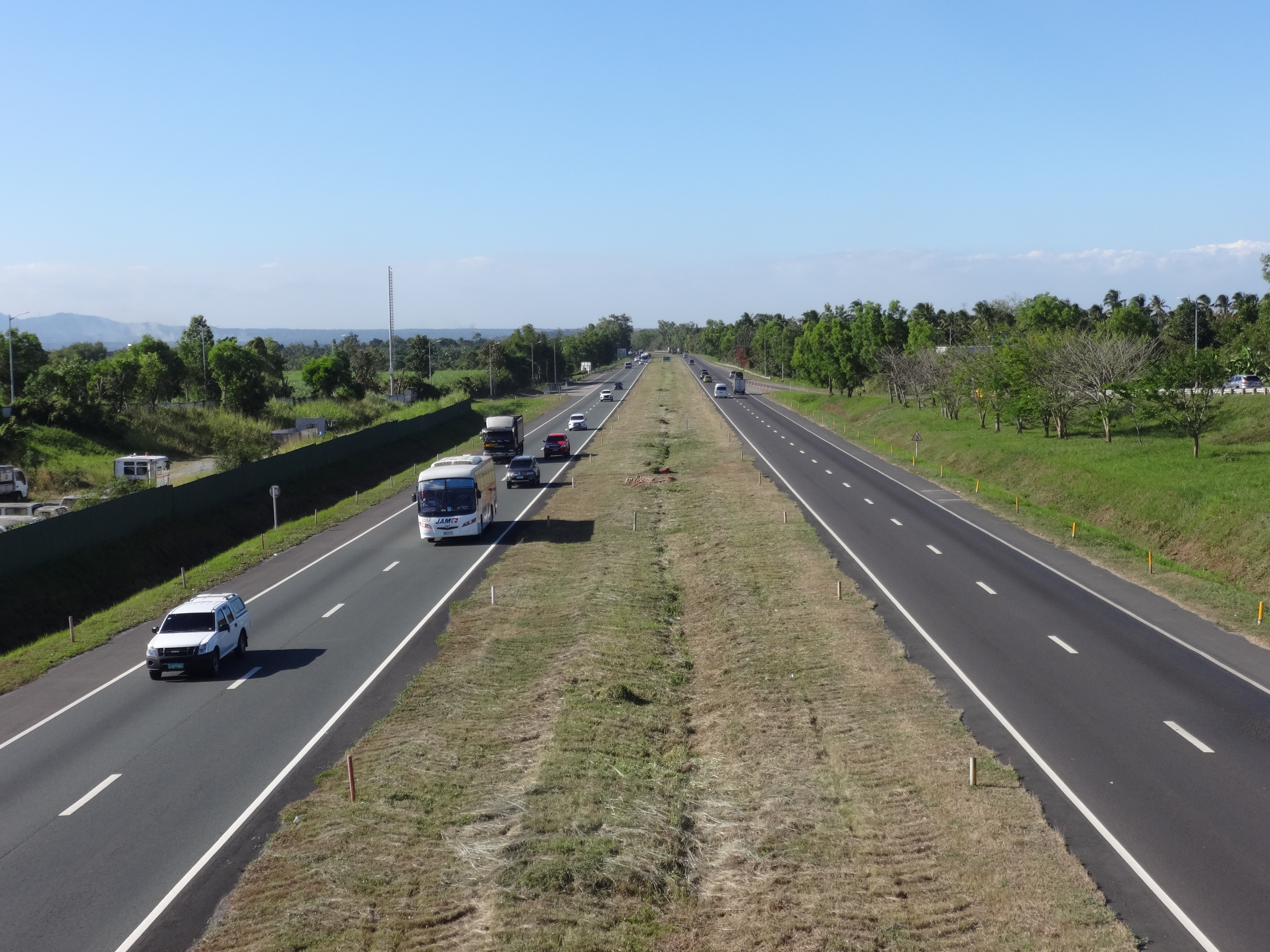
View north from Malvar Exit

The STAR Tollway parallels most of the route of the President Jose P. Laurel Highway, which spurs off from the Maharlika Highway at Santo Tomas towards Lipa and Batangas City, and the Ibaan-Batangas City segment of the Batangas-Quezon Road. The road mostly traverses rural barangays of the cities and municipalities it passes and also overlooks several mountains.

Spanning 22.16 kilometers (13.77 mi), the STAR Tollway starts as the physical extension of SLEX at the boundary signages between two expressways located after the overpass with the abandoned Philippine National Railways (PNR) branch line to Batangas City and an access road for Light Industry and Science Park III at Santo Tomas. An overpass of Pan-Philippine Highway is located after the expressway starts where the road ends until 2008 and after it is the Santo Tomas southbound exit and entrance to serve the city and accommodate vehicles that were already passed the whole of SLEX until the said boundary and starting point of STAR before the exit, and provide entry from the proper, respectively.

The road widens for a short distance as it crosses the San Juan River and enters Tanauan, where the Sto. Tomas toll plaza is located, before narrowing back to two lanes. The road meets with Tanauan Exit, which serves the city proper of Tanauan. Past Tanauan Exit, STAR Tollway descends on a scenic curve before ascending on approach to Malvar. Entering Malvar, the road mostly passes rural areas, mostly containing large coconut plantations and small residential areas. Also, within Malvar, Mount Maculot can be seen on the west of the road and Mount Malarayat can be sighted on the east. Afterwards, it enters Lipa, and the road gradually curving before approaching Lipa Exit, which provides access to the city proper and to the nearby towns of Mataasnakahoy, Cuenca, and Alitagtag. The exit once served as the tollway's southern terminus until 2007, when STAR Tollway was extended southward towards Batangas City.

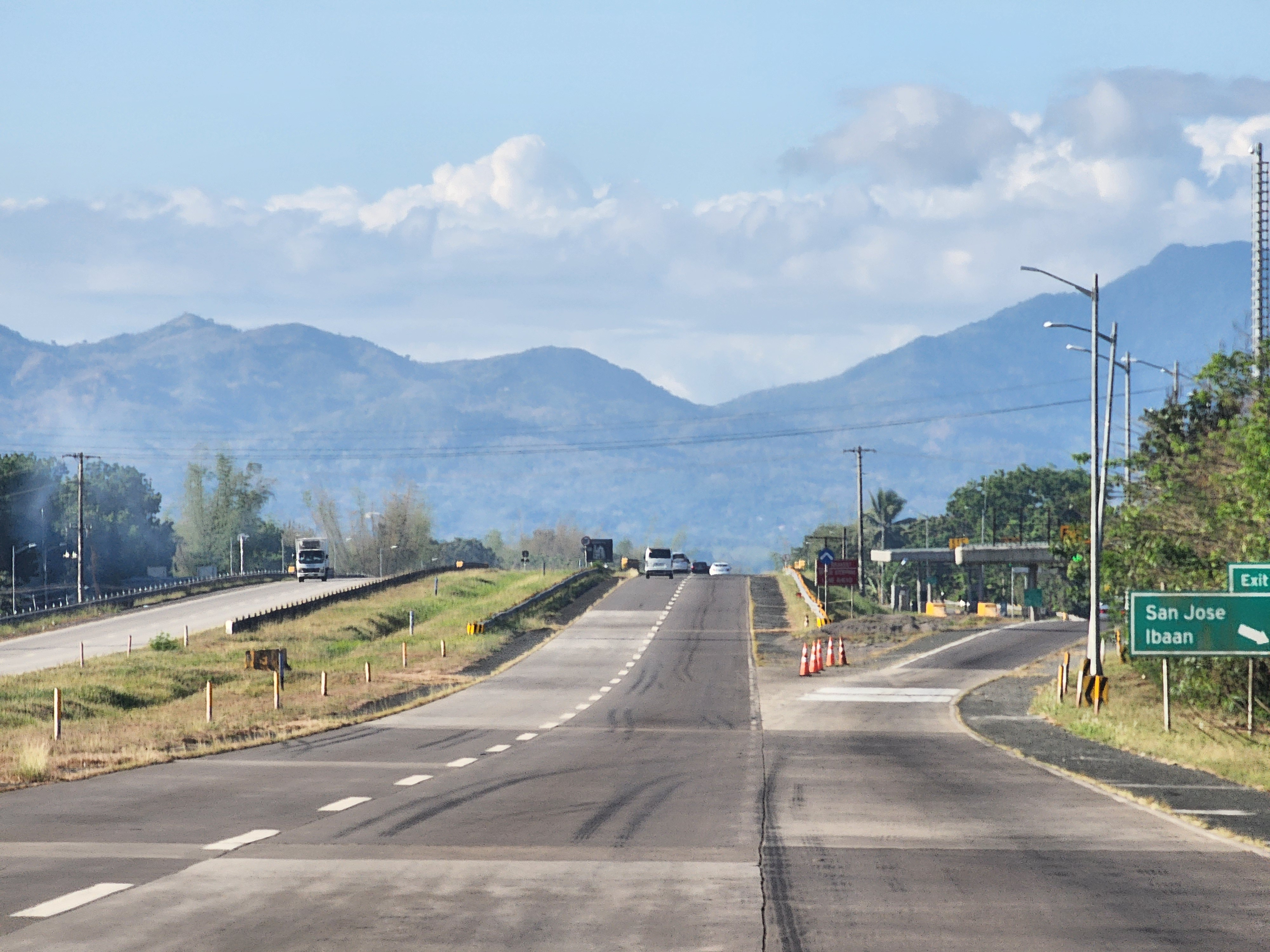
STAR Tollway in Ibaan

Past Lipa Exit, STAR Tollway is mostly dual carriageway, until it narrows in approach to Batangas City. Spanning 19.74 kilometers (12.27 mi), this segment was a two-lane expressway from its opening in 2008, until the second roadway opened on 2014. The roadways of this segment is concrete, with the southbound roadway the former two-lane expressway, that has been in bad condition with increased traffic demand. The road mostly runs through the rural barangays of Lipa. Then, it curves slightly on approach to San Jose and enters Ibaan. At Ibaan Exit, the road intersects San Jose-Ibaan Road at a diamond interchange where the expressway passes above grade. Past Ibaan Exit, STAR Tollway mostly runs an arcing route, traversing several rural barangays of Ibaan and paralleling the Batangas-Quezon Road from Ibaan to Batangas City. The road narrows back to two lanes at Sabang Bridge on the Ibaan-Batangas City boundary. The road becomes a 3-lane road, with a concrete Jersey barrier dividing the road, ascending in a cutting before following a straight course on rolling terrain up to the STAR Tollway's southern terminus at Balagtas Rotunda. The road widens at the Batangas toll plaza (also known as Balagtas toll plaza), narrows back to 3 lanes, and ends at the Balagtas Rotunda, a roundabout with Jose P. Laurel Highway and Batangas Port Diversion Road.

Construction is underway to make the whole segment from Lipa to Batangas City a full-fledged two-lane dual carriageway (i.e. at least two lanes for both northbound and southbound).

== History ==
Logo used from 2001 to 2017.

In an effort to link the different Southern Tagalog provinces to the National Capital Region, the government with the cooperation of the Provincial Government of Batangas and with the technical and country developmental assistance of the Government of Japan through the Japan Official Development Assistance, started the development of the STAR Tollway.

The loan exchange notes and agreement were signed in 1989 and 1990, while the construction started in 1993. However, during the project, Package 1B (Sambat-San Pedro: 4.78km) ran into financial difficulties and produced shoddy work. The DPWH changed the contractor halfway through the project. This leads to the question as to whether the executing agency properly vetted the financial status of the corporations when soliciting for bids. It was originally named as the South Luzon Expressway Extension Project (SLEEP), later renamed as the Southern Tagalog Access Road in 1996. Finally, it was renamed again as the Southern Tagalog Arterial Road, with the word "Access" dropped upon its completion.

On July 12, 1997, Strategic Alliance Development Corporation (STRADEC; including a consortium composed of William Uy Construction Corporation, JH Pajara Construction Corporation, Walter Bau-Ag, Betonval Readyconcrete Inc., JF Cancio & Associates, CODES, and the Philippine National Construction Corporation) was awarded the contract to operate and maintain the expressway, beating other bids such as Philrock Inc. (later merged with EEI Corporation in 2000) in partnership with Grupo Ferrovial of Spain and Benpres (now Lopez Holdings Corporation) with Transroute International (now Egis Group) of France.

On June 1, 2000, President Joseph Estrada inaugurated the first stage of the project from Santo Tomas to Lipa. The second stage was built beginning in 2006.

On March 26, 2008, the second stage between Lipa and Batangas City was opened to the public and inaugurated by President Gloria Macapagal Arroyo. It was built as part of the Road Development Project of the government, linking the South Luzon Expressway to STAR Tollway onwards to the Batangas Port in Batangas City as well as providing an alternate route to the provinces of Marinduque, Romblon and Masbate, and Visayas via Lucena and Matnog Ports at Lucena, Quezon and Matnog, Sorsogon, respectively, which bypasses Santo Tomas, San Pablo and Tiaong at Batangas, Laguna and Quezon. The travel time from Manila to Batangas City was reduced to 2 hours when STAR Tollway II opened. The STAR Tollway Project I and II were funded by Japan Bank for International Cooperation (JBIC) and Japan International Cooperation Agency (JICA) and implemented by the Department of Public Works and Highways – Urban Roads Project Office (DPWH – URPO).

The STAR Tollway is now under the supervision of the Toll Regulatory Board (TRB) and is being maintained by STAR Tollway Corporation, a subsidiary of San Miguel Corporation.

=== Renaming ===
On February 9, 2004, Batangas's 3rd District Congresswoman Victoria Hernandez-Reyes authored House Bill 2753, or also known as the "Act of Renaming the Southern Tagalog Arterial Road (STAR) to Apolinario Mabini Superhighway (AMS)." On May 15, 2007, President Gloria Macapagal Arroyo signed and approved House Bill 2753 to rename the Southern Tagalog Arterial Road to Apolinario Mabini Superhighway, after the Filipino revolutionary and Batangas native Apolinario Mabini, and it was made into a law called the Republic Act 9462 (RA 9462).

On January 2, 2011, a fatal head-on collision between a jeep and a bus had occurred on an undivided two-way lane approach between Batangas City and Ibaan, resulting in the deaths of 7 people, and 4 injuries.

=== Redevelopment ===
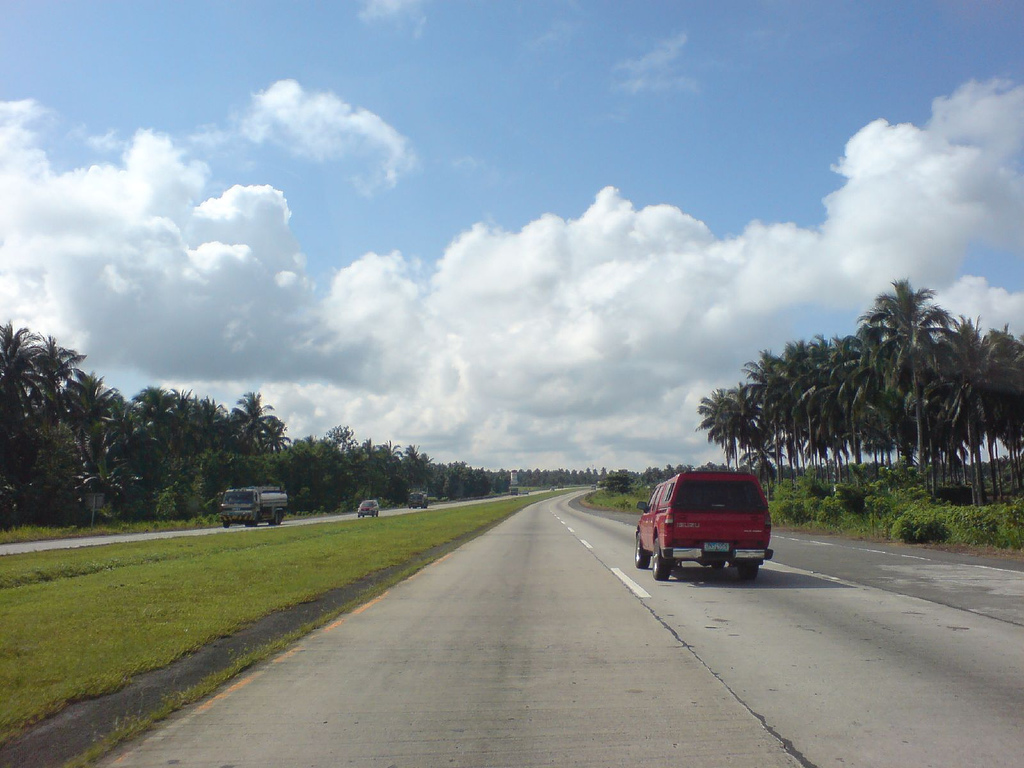
The Santo Tomas – Lipa segment of STAR Tollway in Malvar, before the rehabilitation project, that added an asphalt overlay on the existing roadway (2008)

Announced by the concessionaire, STAR-Infrastructure Development Corporation (SIDC), on May 16, 2013, the STAR Tollway Upgrading and Rehabilitation Project began in July 2013 as announced by SIDC president Melvin Nazareno. Under the rehabilitation project, the expressway undergone several upgrades on its roads and facilities in order to cope with the traffic demand of the expressway and to further improve the safety for motorists. The expressway redevelopment included asphalting the Santo Tomas – Lipa segment, upgrading the Lipa – Batangas City segment to a four-lane divided expressway, improvements on the toll collection system, installation of closed-circuit television (CCTV) cameras for traffic monitoring, and addition of lighting on some segments. The expansion of the Lipa–Batangas City segment commenced in June 2013, and finished in June 2015 with adding of lights.

Sabang Bridge, which connects the town of Ibaan and Batangas City, was closed to all traffic in December 2016 to repair damage of Typhoon Nina (Nock-ten), leaving Ibaan Exit to be the temporary south end of the expressway. On August 15, 2017, a partial re-opening of Sabang Bridge was conducted for Class 1 vehicles and on August 20, 2017, it was re-opened to all vehicle classes resuming full operations to and from the Batangas Exit.

In December 2022, the Seamless Southern Tollways project was implemented on STAR Tollway to simplify the toll collection process to a single payment upon exit. Additional toll plazas were built at the Santo Tomas interchange, and the Santo Tomas toll plaza along the expressway was eventually demolished in 2025.

In November 2023, STAR Tollway started a road widening project, which will increase the number of lanes from 2 to 3 lanes per direction. It also includes upgrading the final 2+1 segment in Batangas City to dual carriageway, including the construction of a northbound span for Sabang River Bridge at the Batangas City–Ibaan boundary and an eastbound span for Tinga River Bridge at barangay Tinga Itaas.

In April 2024, the Balagtas Flyover opened, allowing traffic from STAR to bypass the Balagtas Rotonda en route to Batangas City proper or the Diversion Road.

== Toll ==
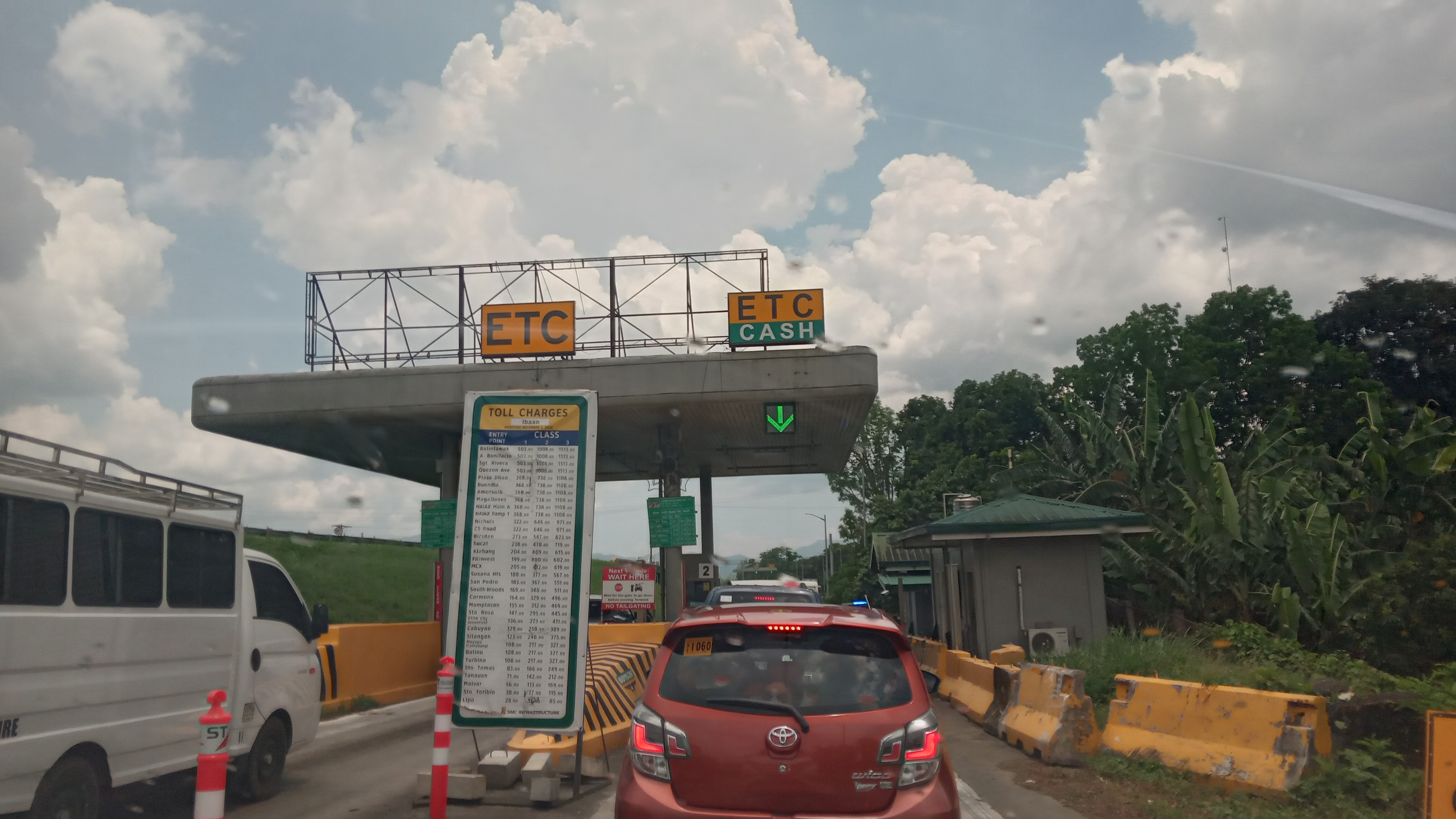
Ibaan Toll Plaza (southbound exit)

The whole expressway employs a closed system, where motorists are charged based on the kilometers travelled from the entry to exit point vehicle class. Toll collection is done upon exit at the expressway, SLEX, or MCX or at Skyway's Main toll plaza in Muntinlupa, Metro Manila, under San Miguel Corporation's Seamless Southern Tollways program.

The expressway fully implements an electronic toll collection (ETC) system, the Autosweep RFID, using RFID technology. Such ETC system is shared with Skyway, SLEX, NAIAX, TPLEX, and MCX.

Class	Rate
Class 1 (Cars, Motorcycles, SUVs, Jeepneys)	₱2.482/km
Class 2 (Buses, Light Trucks)	₱4.964/km
Class 3 (Heavy Trucks)	₱7.422/km

== Services ==
The Southern Tagalog Arterial Road currently has three service areas, all of which are Petron stations, with two on the northbound and one on the southbound. The service areas also provide ETC reloading for Autosweep RFID users.

Location	Kilometer	Name	Services	Notes
Malvar	75	Petron KM 75	Petron, Treats, Dunkin' Donuts, McDonald's	Southbound only.
Lipa	79	Petron Star Tollway (Petron Lipa Star Toll)	Petron, Treats, Chowking, Cafe de Lipa, Dunkin' Donuts	Northbound only.
Lipa	86	Petron KM 86	Petron, Treats, Potato Corner, Jollibee	Northbound only.

== Exits ==
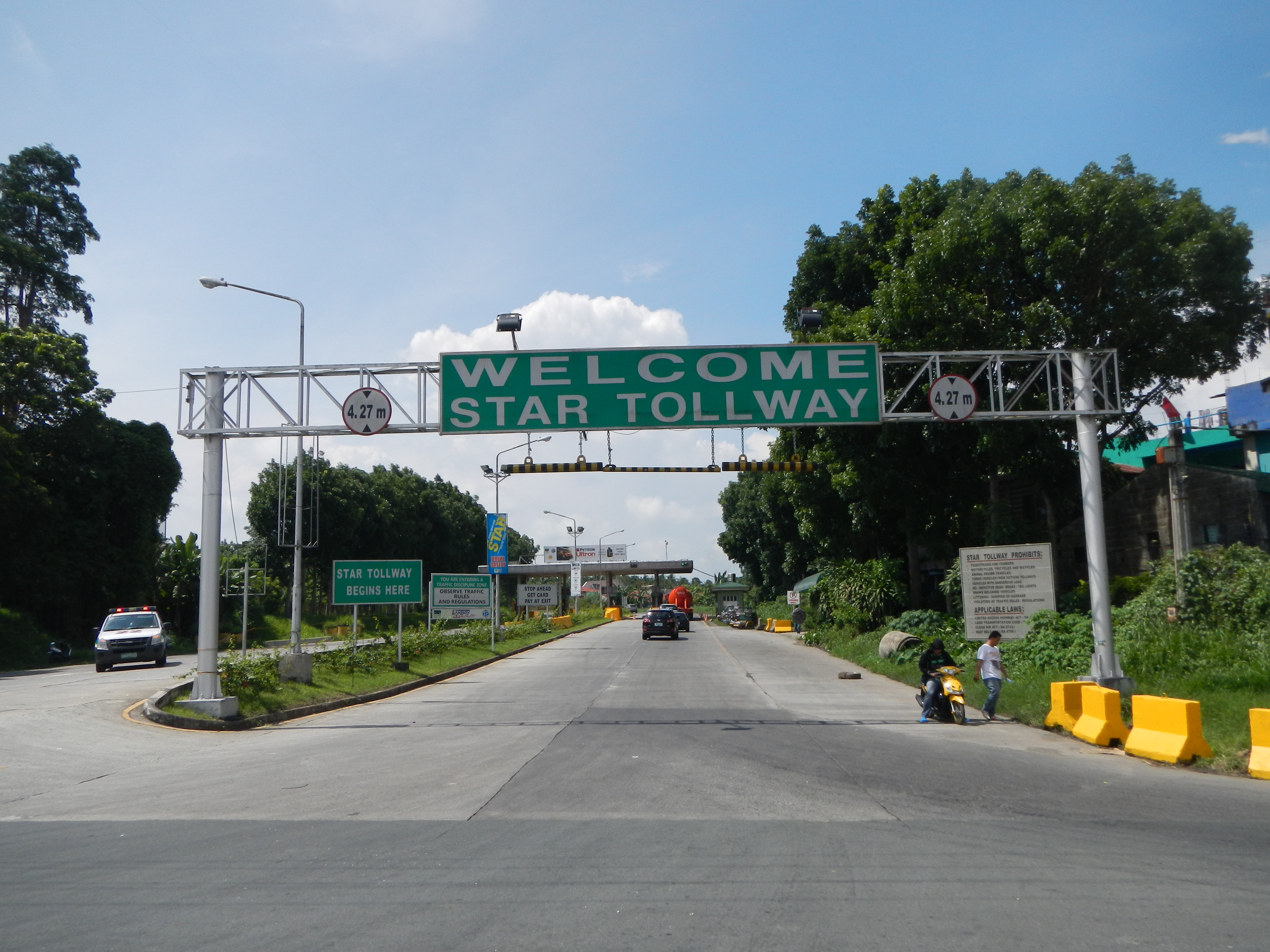
Lipa Exit

The entire route is located in Batangas. Exits are numbered by kilometer post, with Rizal Park in Manila designated as kilometer 0. Kilometer count begins at kilometer post 57.4 at the boundary of South Luzon Expressway (SLEX) and STAR Tollway after LISP Underpass and before the Santo Tomas southbound exit and entrance.

City/Municipality	km	mi	Exit	Name	Destinations	Notes
Santo Tomas	57.4	35.7	Northern terminus (SLEX-STAR Tollway boundary signages) after Santo Tomas northbound exit; continues north to Manila as E2 (South Luzon Expressway)			
Santo Tomas	57	35		Santo Tomas	AH26 (Maharlika Highway) – Santo Tomas, Calamba, San Pablo, Quezon, Lucena, Camarines Sur, Albay, Sorsogon, Matnog, Visayas	Folded diamond interchange; northbound exit and southbound entrance
Tanauan	61	38	Santo Tomas toll plaza (2010–2025; demolished)			
Tanauan	65	40		Tanauan City (Sambat)	N421 (Tanauan–Talisay National Road) – Tanauan, Talisay, Laurel, Tagaytay	Diamond interchange
Malvar	70	43		Malvar (Bulihan)	Balete–Malvar Provincial Road / Pedro Montecer Street – Malvar, Balete	Diamond interchange
Malvar	75	47	Petron KM 75 service area (southbound only)			
Lipa				Bugtong Na Pulo	Bugtong Na Pulo Interchange Access Road – LIMA Estate	Half partial cloverleaf (west half), and half diamond interchange (east half)
Lipa	78	48		Santo Toribio (Balete / F. Leviste Highway)	N431-1 (F. Leviste Highway) – Balete	Diamond interchange
Lipa	79	49	Petron STAR Tollway service area (northbound only)			
Lipa	82	51		Lipa City (Tambo)	N4 (Jose P. Laurel Highway) – Lipa, Cuenca, Alitagtag, Mataasnakahoy	Folded diamond interchange; former southern terminus (2000–2008)
Lipa	86	53	Petron KM 86 service area (northbound only)			
San Jose			No major junctions			
Ibaan	93	58		Ibaan (Malainin)	San Jose-Ibaan Road – Ibaan, San Jose, Quezon, Lucena, Camarines Sur, Albay, Sorsogon, Matnog, Visayas	Diamond interchange
Ibaan – Batangas City boundary	99	62	Sabang Bridge			
Batangas City				Tinga	N435 (Batangas–Ibaan Road) / STAR Tollway-Pinamucan Bypass	Future trumpet interchange
Batangas City	101	63	Batangas (Balagtas) toll plaza			
Batangas City	102	63		Batangas (Balagtas)	N4 (Jose P. Laurel Highway) / N434 (Batangas Port Diversion Road) / Batangas–Balete Road – Batangas City, Batangas Port, Quezon, Lucena, Mindoro, Aklan, Iloilo, Negros, Cebu	Roundabout; southern terminus
1.000 mi = 1.609 km; 1.000 km = 0.621 mi: Incomplete access; Tolled; Unopened

== See also ==
- Transportation in the Philippines
- Department of Public Works and Highways
- Philippine National Construction Corporation
