= Tirso Ronquillo =

Filipino academic administrator and engineer

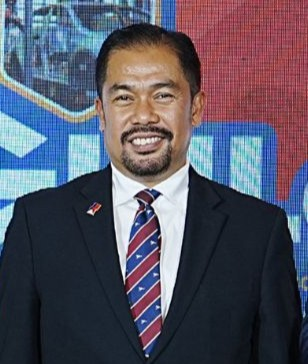
- Ronquillo in 2025
- Education: Doctor of Management; Master of Electronics Engineering
- Occupations: Academic administrator, electronics engineer
- Employer: Batangas State University
- Known for: First President of the National Engineering University (Philippines); Project Leader of Tactical Operative Amphibious Drive
- Title: University President

Tirso A. Ronquillo is a Filipino academic administrator and electronics engineer. He serves as the president of Batangas State University, which the government declared as the National Engineering University of the Philippines in 2022. He is also the president of the Philippine Association of State Universities and Colleges (PASUC). In 2023, he was appointed to the National Innovation Council, representing the academic sector.

== Education ==
Ronquillo holds a Master of Electronics Engineering degree and a Doctor of Management degree. He is a member of the Institute of Electrical and Electronics Engineers. In 2013, the Institute of Electronics Engineers of the Philippines named him the Most Outstanding Electronics Engineer in the Academe.

== Career ==
=== Batangas State University ===
Ronquillo became the president of Batangas State University in July 2014. Under his leadership, the university developed the "Tactical Operative Amphibious Drive", a locally made amphibious vehicle designed for disaster response. Ronquillo served as the project leader for the vehicle's development, which was funded by the Department of Science and Technology.

He also spearheaded the establishment of the Knowledge, Innovation, Science and Technology (KIST) Park, the first university-based technology park in the Philippines. In 2024, his administration launched the LIMA Campus in partnership with Aboitiz Economic Estates to focus on industry-based engineering education. Under his presidency, the university's student team won the World Championship at the World Robot Olympiad in Singapore in 2025.

On April 11, 2022, Republic Act No. 11694 was signed into law, declaring Batangas State University as the National Engineering University. Ronquillo took his oath as the first president under this new charter on July 11, 2022.

=== PASUC Leadership ===
Ronquillo serves as the president of the Philippine Association of State Universities and Colleges. In this role, he lobbies for the budget of 113 state universities before the Congress of the Philippines. In 2024, he thanked the House of Representatives for securing a ₱128.1 billion budget for SUCs, noting that the funds would support over 1.85 million students.

=== National Innovation Council ===
On July 6, 2023, Ronquillo took his oath as an executive member of the National Innovation Council (NIC). He was appointed by the President to represent the academe (academic sector) in the council, which is chaired by the President of the Philippines.

== Awards ==
- Most Outstanding Electronics Engineer in the Academe (2013) – Institute of Electronics Engineers of the Philippines
- Presidential Award of Recognition (2011)
- Outstanding Faculty of the Year (2005)
