= Metrobank-MTAP-DepEd Math Challenge =

Annual nationwide mathematics competition in the Philippines

The Metrobank-MTAP-DepEd Math Challenge (MMC) is an annual nationwide mathematics competition in the Philippines jointly organized by the Metrobank Foundation, Inc. (MBFI), the Mathematics Teachers Association of the Philippines (MTAP), and the Department of Education (DepEd). Held nationwide for public and private schools, MMC features elimination rounds at the division and regional levels culminating in national finals for elementary (Grade 6) and junior high school (Grade 10) students. Organizers and news reports have described MMC as the country's longest-running and largest annual math contest for basic education, drawing more than 500,000 participants in the elimination rounds in peak years.

== History ==
Metrobank Foundation launched the Math Challenge in the late 1990s in partnership with MTAP and DepEd to promote numeracy and problem-solving among basic-education learners; MBFI histories and later program releases date the MMC's launch to 1998. The contest was initially conducted up to the NCR Regional Finals only, but became a nationwide contest in 2001. DepEd memoranda in the 2000s formalized the competition as a recurring nationwide activity supported by regional and schools division offices, with annual circulars specifying mechanics, schedules, and roles of the partners.

The final stage of the MMC was regularly held at the Metrobank Plaza Auditorium in Makati, especially by the mid-2010s, MMC national-finals events were regularly held in Metrobank Plaza Auditorium (Makati City). Initially also, the contest awarded individual and team champions at all grade levels of elementary and high school. But since the 2010s, the contest has been limited to individual and team categories for Grade 6 and fourth-year/Grade 10 students. In 2014, media coverage noted the contest's adoption of tablets and other digital tools in the conduct of some rounds to speed up answer capture and judging.

During the 2018-2019 cycle, DepEd issued a comprehensive primer and mechanics (DM 191, s. 2018) standardizing grade coverage (Grades 1-10 for eliminations; Grades 6 and 10 for higher stages), hurdle rates, and selection rules for national finalists across NCR, the rest of Luzon, Visayas, and Mindanao. DepEd regional and division offices published official results for regional finals, reflecting the contest's operational footprint across the country.

In 2019, DepEd announced that 22 students from 16 schools advanced to the national finals set at the Metrobank Plaza Auditorium, highlighting representation from both public and private institutions. The 2020 cycle was launched by DepEd (DM 144, s. 2019) with elimination and division rounds conducted nationwide in January–February 2020; local offices issued division and regional circulars and results ahead of pandemic disruptions later that year.

In the early 2020s, apart from competition activity, DepEd encouraged participation in allied MTAP programs (e.g., Program of Excellence in Mathematics), including online classes during the pandemic period. In 2025, MBFI announced that its longstanding MMC would be “reimagined” into a broader numeracy remediation program branded Metrobank Foundation SOLUTION, citing MMC's legacy since 1998 and its nationwide reach, while positioning the new program to address current learning gaps.

== Format ==
MMC is jointly implemented by MBFI, MTAP, and DepEd. DepEd division mathematics supervisors administer the elimination and division rounds; MTAP oversees regional finals; and MBFI organizes the national finals and provides medals, trophies, and cash prizes. The competition follows a multi-stage structure:

- Elimination round (Grades 1–10) – written test held simultaneously nationwide in designated testing centers; the number of qualifiers to division finals per grade depends on participating schools in each division.
- Division finals (Grades 1-6 and 7–10) – written/oral rounds for teams of two per grade level; top teams advance subject to minimum scores (“hurdle rates”).
- Regional finals (Grades 6 and 10) – individual (written) and team (oral) contests; first placers and other top performers meeting set hurdle rates qualify for consideration at the national level.
- National finals (Grades 6 and 10) – individual (written and oral composite) and team (oral) events; finalists are selected from NCR, the rest of Luzon, Visayas, and Mindanao plus additional top scorers nationwide, all meeting national hurdle rates.

Contest materials are prepared by the national secretariat; for eliminations and division rounds, sealed questionnaires are transmitted via designated Metrobank branches or DepEd offices with documented chain-of-custody procedures.

== Participants ==
MMC is open to bona fide learners enrolled in public and private schools nationwide (Grades 1-10 for eliminations). MBFI program notes and media reports have described participation of over 500,000 students in elimination rounds in peak years, with finalists drawn from dozens of schools at the national level. In the 2015 national finals alone, 53 students from 34 schools (18 public, 16 private) qualified for the culminating rounds. DepEd division and regional circulars across the country document the breadth of participation at local levels each year (e.g., Zambales, Dasmariñas, and other divisions).

== Awards and materials ==
MMC national winners receive trophies, medals, and cash prizes from MBFI; organizers have also used the program to promote student savings accounts for winners in some years. MBFI and MTAP have produced primers, mechanics, and review materials aligned with the K to 12 Mathematics curriculum for contest use; DepEd's official primer (2018) details mechanics and coverage by grade level.

== Related programs ==
Apart from MMC, MTAP and DepEd promote mathematics enrichment through Saturday/after-school programs and the Program of Excellence in Mathematics (POEM), including online classes during the pandemic period.
