= Malvar =

Municipality in Batangas, Philippines

- Municipality
- Municipality of Malvar
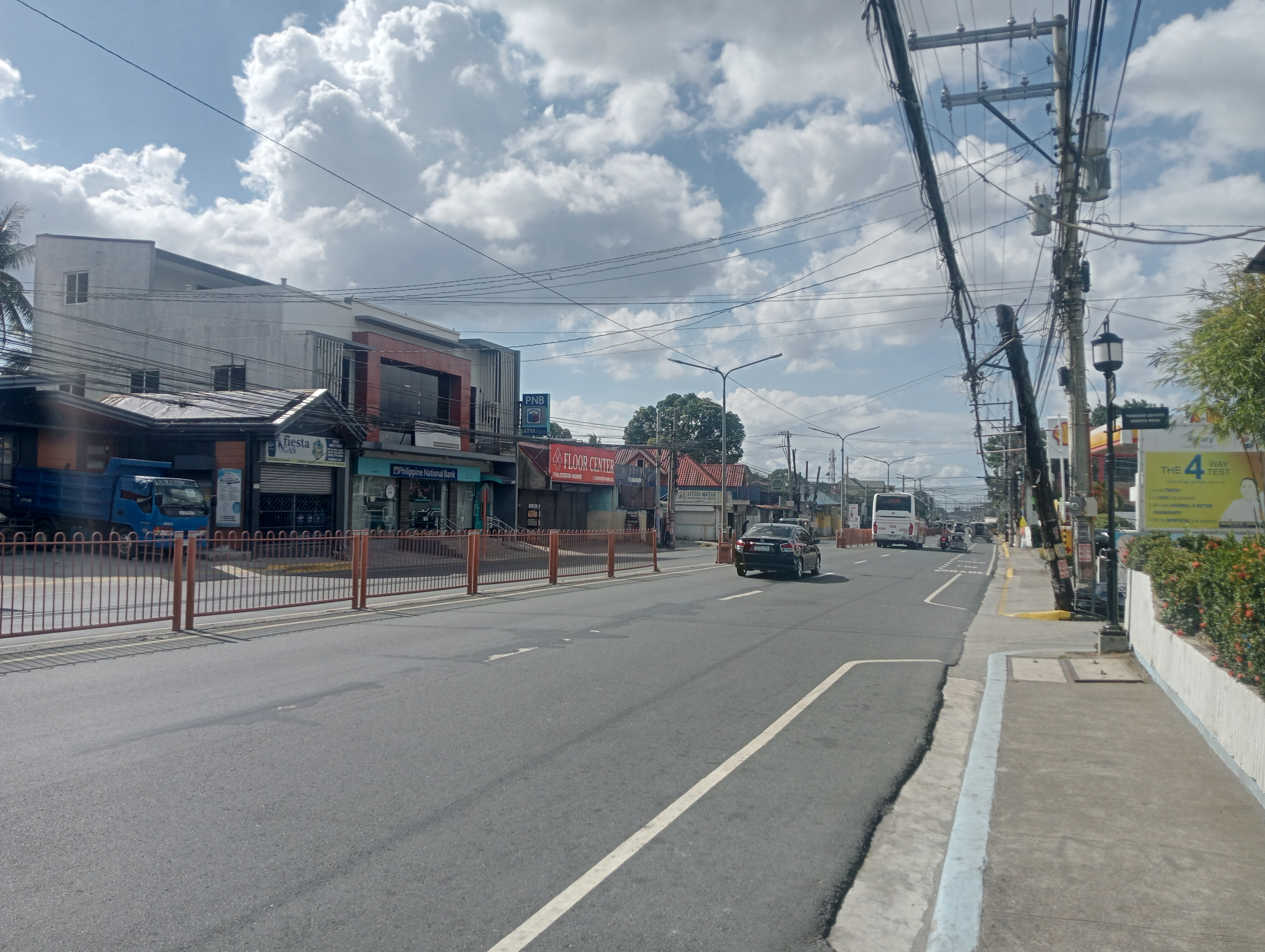
- President J.P. Laurel Highway in Malvar

- Seal

- Map of Batangas with Malvar highlighted
- Interactive map of Malvar
- Location within the Philippines
- Coordinates: 14°02′30″N 121°09′30″E
- Country: Philippines
- Region: Calabarzon
- Province: Batangas
- District: 3rd district
- Founded: January 10, 1919
- Named for: Miguel Malvar
- Barangays: 15 (see Barangays)

Government
  - Type: Sangguniang Bayan
  - Mayor: Artemio M. Abu
  - Vice Mayor: Emiliano C. Lat
  - Representative: King George Leandro Antonio V. Collantes
  - Municipal Council: Members: Delia L. Tagle; Ralph Julius Leo S. Morcilla; Alberto C. Lat; Kurt Patrick V. Abu; Matt Louie M. Aranda; Karina C. Reyes; Edgardo V. Licarte; Jeric M. Platon
  - Electorate: 39,256 voters (2025)

Area
  - Total: 33.00 km^{2} (12.74 sq mi)
- Elevation: 213 m (699 ft)
- Highest elevation: 354 m (1,161 ft)
- Lowest elevation: 24 m (79 ft)

Population (2024 census)
  - Total: 74,565
  - Density: 2,260/km^{2} (5,852/sq mi)
  - Households: 17,064

Economy
  - Income class: 1st municipal income class
  - Poverty incidence: 5.8% (2023)
  - Revenue: ₱ 663.6 million (2024)
  - Assets: ₱ 2,404 million (2024)
  - Expenditure: ₱ 192.7 million (2024)
  - Liabilities: ₱ 212.9 million (2024)

Service provider
  - Electricity: Batangas 2 Electric Cooperative (BATELEC 2)
- Time zone: UTC+8 (PST)
- ZIP code: 4233
- PSGC: 0401017000
- IDD : area code: +63 (0)43
- Native languages: Tagalog
- Feast date: January 10
- Website: www.malvarbatangas.gov.ph

Malvar, officially the Municipality of Malvar (Filipino: Bayan ng Malvar), is a municipality in the province of Batangas, Philippines. According to the 2024 census, it has a population of 74,565 people.

== Etymology ==
The municipality was named after General Miguel Malvar, a native of Santo Tomas, Batangas, and one of the last Filipino generals to surrender to the Americans during the Philippine-American War in 1902.

Its previous name before it became a municipality was Luta, derived from the name of Dayangdayang Luta, the youngest daughter of Datu Banga (a descendant of Datu Puti), who ruled the area. She was the most beautiful lady in the place who was loved and cherished by the inhabitants. She fell in love with a Chinese named Ling and was about to be married when her elder sister Kampupot took interest in him. However, out of the treachery and jealousy of her sister, she was executed and died in the arms of her Chinese lover. From then on, the place was named Luta in her honor.

== History ==
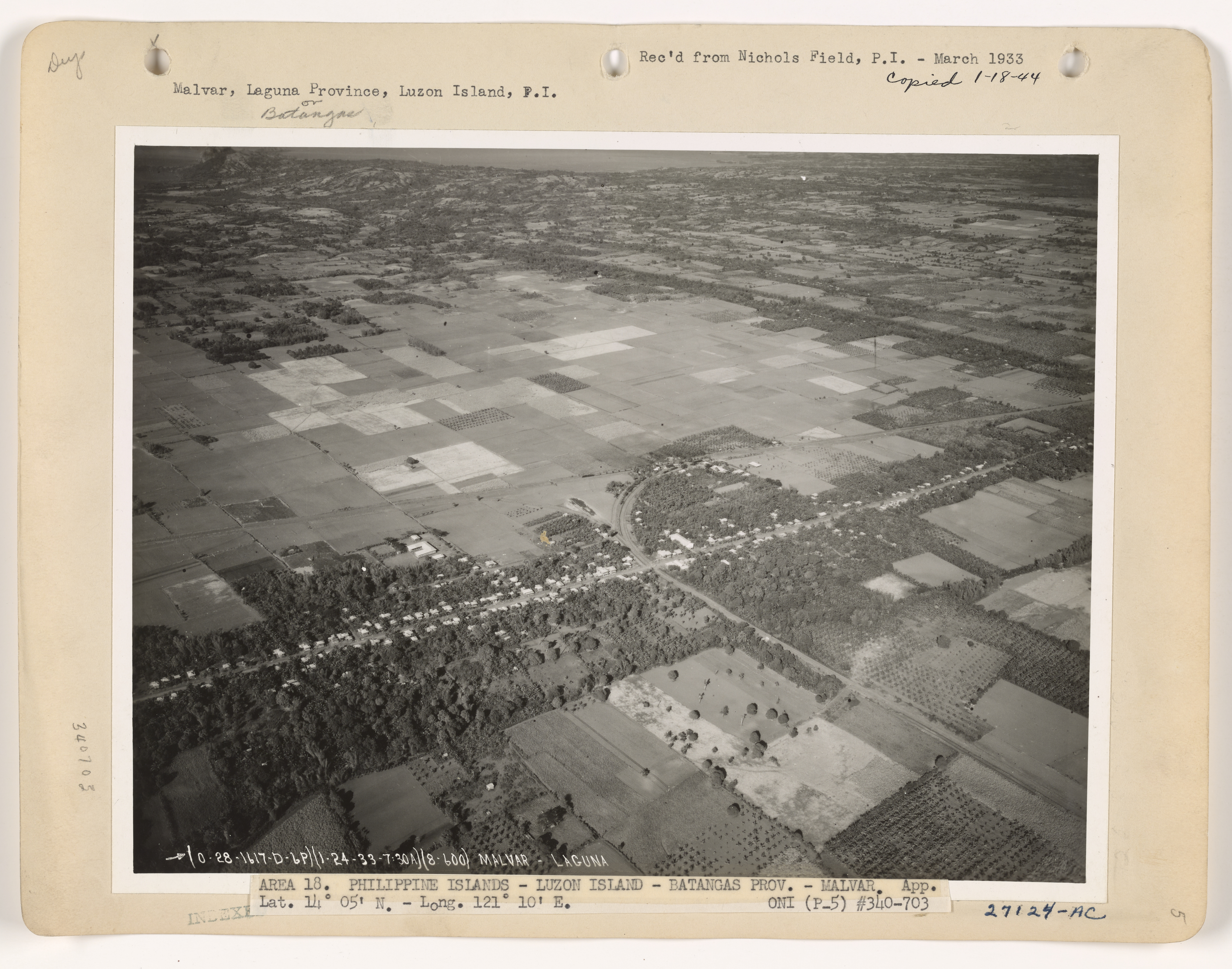
Aerial view of Malvar, circa 1930s

Malvar traces its origin to Luta, which was once a barrio of Lipa. According to Ferdinand Blumentritt who wrote many articles about Philippine history which were published in Boletin de la Sociedad Geografica in Madrid, Spain in 1866, Malvar's history dates back to the 13th century when Datu Puti, one of the ten legendary datus who escaped from Sultan Makatunao of Borneo, settled in what is now the province of Batangas. His descendants inhabited present-day Laguna, Cavite, Bicol, and Luta.

Luta's march toward becoming a municipality began here. The Samahang Mag-aararo, recognized as pioneers of this movement, was organized in Luta. Its members were Mariano R. Lat, Gregorio Leviste, Miguel L. Aranda, Simeon Esleigue, Constancio Manalo, Pedro Lat-Torres, Nicasio Gutierrez, Gregorio Villapando, Estanislaw Lat, Pelagio Wagan, Sebastian Trinidad and Julian Lantin. Through its organizers and members, the first steps toward making the locality a municipality were taken. The seat of the municipal government was situated in Luta.

With their (The Samahang Mag-aararo) devotion, patience, and perseverance and with the help of the Interior Secretary Teodoro Kalaw, Malvar was finally created a municipality by an executive order issued by acting Governor-General Charles Yeater on December 16, 1918. The proclamation took effect on January 10, 1919, the day the municipality was inaugurated. It initially included the adjoining barrios of Payapa, Kalikangan (Caligañgan), San Gallo (San Galo), and Bilukaw. As time went by, these original barrios were divided and were given other names. Payapa was divided and became San Fernando, Santiago, and Bagong Pook. Kalikakan became the barrios of San Andres and San Juan. San Gallo became the barrios of San Pioquinto, San Pedro (including Sitio Calejon) and Bilucaw became San Isidro and Bilucao. These names given to each barrio were based on the names of the locality's most powerful or honored man.

== Geography ==
Malvar is located at 14°02′30″N 121°09′30″E. According to the Philippine Statistics Authority, the municipality has a land area of 33.00 square kilometers (12.74 sq mi) constituting 1.06% of the 3,119.75-square-kilometer (1,204.54 sq mi) total area of Batangas.

Located 37 kilometers (23 mi) from Batangas City and 68 kilometers (42 mi) south of Manila and accessible by the STAR Tollway, Malvar is surrounded by Tanauan to the north, Santo Tomas to the east, Lipa to the south and Balete to the west. With the expansion of Metro Manila, Malvar is now part of the Manila conurbation (which reaches Lipa).

=== Barangays ===
Malvar is politically subdivided into 15 barangays, as indicated in the matrix below. Each barangay consists of puroks and some have sitios.

PSGC	Barangay	Population			±% p.a.	
		2024		2010		
041017001	Bagong Pook	2.7%	2,049	1,932	▴	0.41%
041017002	Bilucao (San Isidro Western)	2.5%	1,842	1,587	▴	1.04%
041017003	Bulihan	3.1%	2,311	1,472	▴	3.17%
041017004	San Gregorio	1.8%	1,336	1,138	▴	1.12%
041017005	Luta del Norte	5.3%	3,989	3,053	▴	1.87%
041017006	Luta del Sur	6.3%	4,661	3,685	▴	1.64%
041017008	Poblacion	10.2%	7,632	7,049	▴	0.55%
041017012	San Andres	4.1%	3,074	2,869	▴	0.48%
041017013	San Fernando	7.3%	5,446	4,349	▴	1.57%
041017015	San Isidro East	2.1%	1,603	1,524	▴	0.35%
041017016	San Juan	4.1%	3,069	2,907	▴	0.38%
041017017	San Pedro II (Western)	2.7%	1,988	1,499	▴	1.97%
041017018	San Pedro I (Eastern)	3.3%	2,448	1,681	▴	2.64%
041017019	San Pioquinto	9.5%	7,068	5,227	▴	2.11%
041017020	Santiago	10.4%	7,754	5,980	▴	1.82%
	Total		74,565	45,952	▴	3.41%

=== Climate ===
Climate data for Malvar
Month	Jan	Feb	Mar	Apr	May	Jun	Jul	Aug	Sep	Oct	Nov	Dec	Year
Mean daily maximum °C (°F)	27 (81)	29 (84)	30 (86)	32 (90)	30 (86)	29 (84)	28 (82)	27 (81)	27 (81)	28 (82)	28 (82)	27 (81)	29 (83)
Mean daily minimum °C (°F)	19 (66)	19 (66)	19 (66)	21 (70)	23 (73)	23 (73)	23 (73)	23 (73)	23 (73)	22 (72)	20 (68)	19 (66)	21 (70)
Average precipitation mm (inches)	11 (0.4)	13 (0.5)	14 (0.6)	32 (1.3)	101 (4.0)	142 (5.6)	208 (8.2)	187 (7.4)	175 (6.9)	131 (5.2)	68 (2.7)	39 (1.5)	1,121 (44.3)
Average rainy days	5.2	5.0	7.4	11.5	19.8	23.5	27.0	25.9	25.2	23.2	15.5	8.3	197.5
Source: Meteoblue

== Demographics ==
Population census of Malvar
Year	Pop.	±% p.a.
1939	6,637	—
1948	7,787	+1.79%
1960	10,313	+2.37%
1970	14,169	+3.22%
1975	15,584	+1.93%
1980	18,028	+2.96%
1990	24,253	+3.01%
1995	27,771	+2.57%
2000	32,691	+3.56%
2007	41,730	+3.42%
2010	45,952	+3.57%
2015	56,270	+3.93%
2020	64,379	+2.87%
2024	74,565	+3.59%
Source: Philippine Statistics Authority

In the 2024 census, Malvar had a population of 74,565 people. The population density was 2,300 inhabitants per square kilometer (6,000/sq mi).

== Economy ==
Poverty incidence of Malvar (%)

Source: Philippine Statistics Authority

== Government ==
=== Local government ===
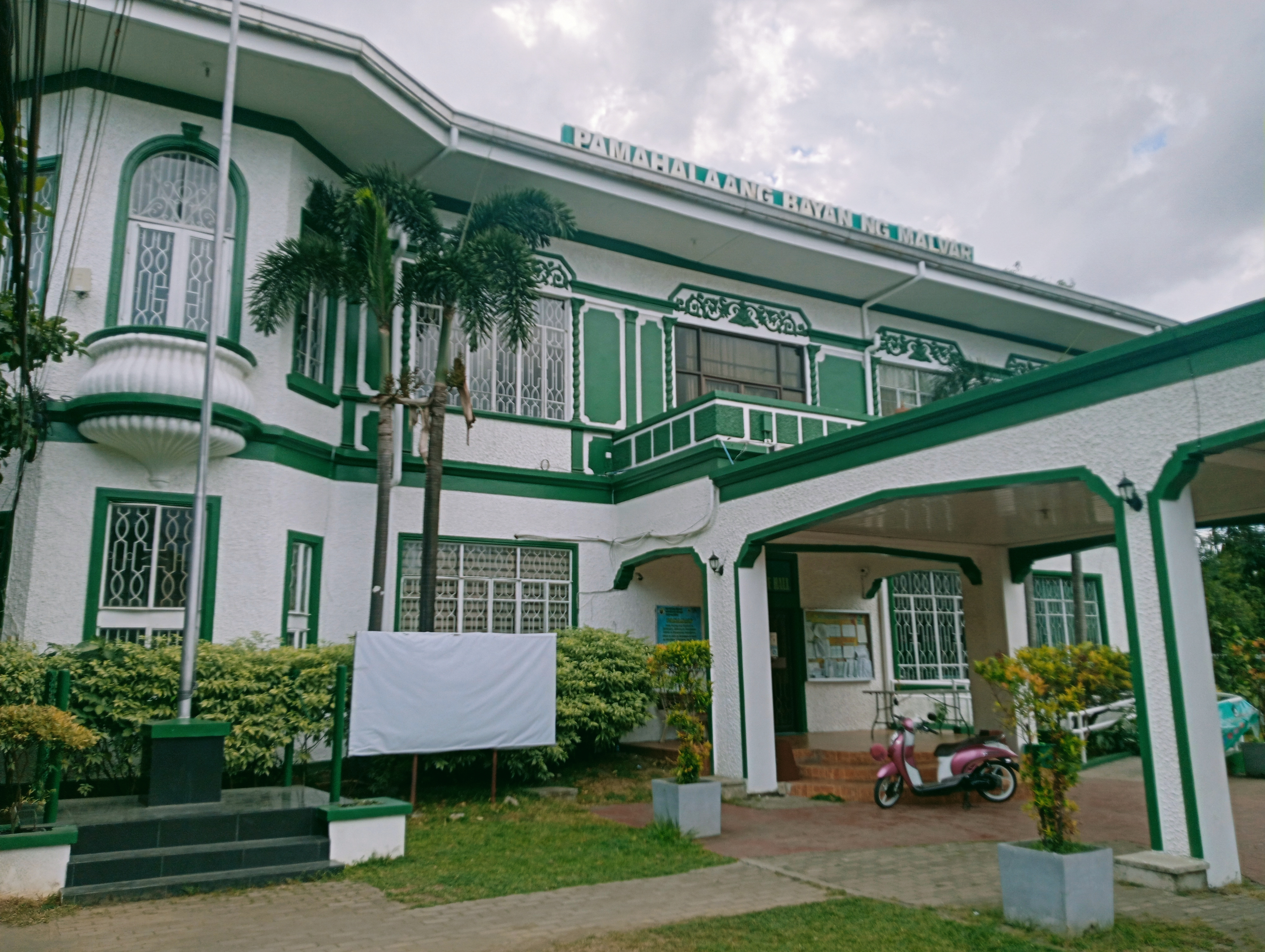
Municipal hall

=== List of chief executive ===
1. Gregorio Leviste: 1919-1924
2. Simeon Esleigue: 1924-1925
3. Julio Leviste: 1925-1930
4. Benito Leviste: 1930–1939, 1945-1950
5. Trinidad Leviste: 1939-1941
6. Angel Leviste: 1941-1942
7. Fidel Leviste: 1942-1944
8. Eustacio Endaya: 1944–1945,1968-1980
9. Benito Leviste: 1930–1939, 1945-1950
10. Pedro Lat: 1951-1955
11. Pedro Montecer: 1955-1959
12. Isabelo Navarro: 1959-1967
13. Eustacio Endaya: 1944–1945,1968-1980
14. Fermin Malabanan: 1980
15. Maximo Reyes: 1980-1986
16. Patricio Villegas: 1986-1998
17. Teodora Villegas: 1998-2001
18. Cristeta C. Reyes: 2001-2010
19. Carlito D. Reyes, MD: 2010-2016
20. Cristeta C. Reyes: 2016-2018
21. Alberto C. Lat: 2018-2019
22. Cristeta C. Reyes: 2019–2025
23. Artemio "Art" M. Abu: 2025–present

== Education ==
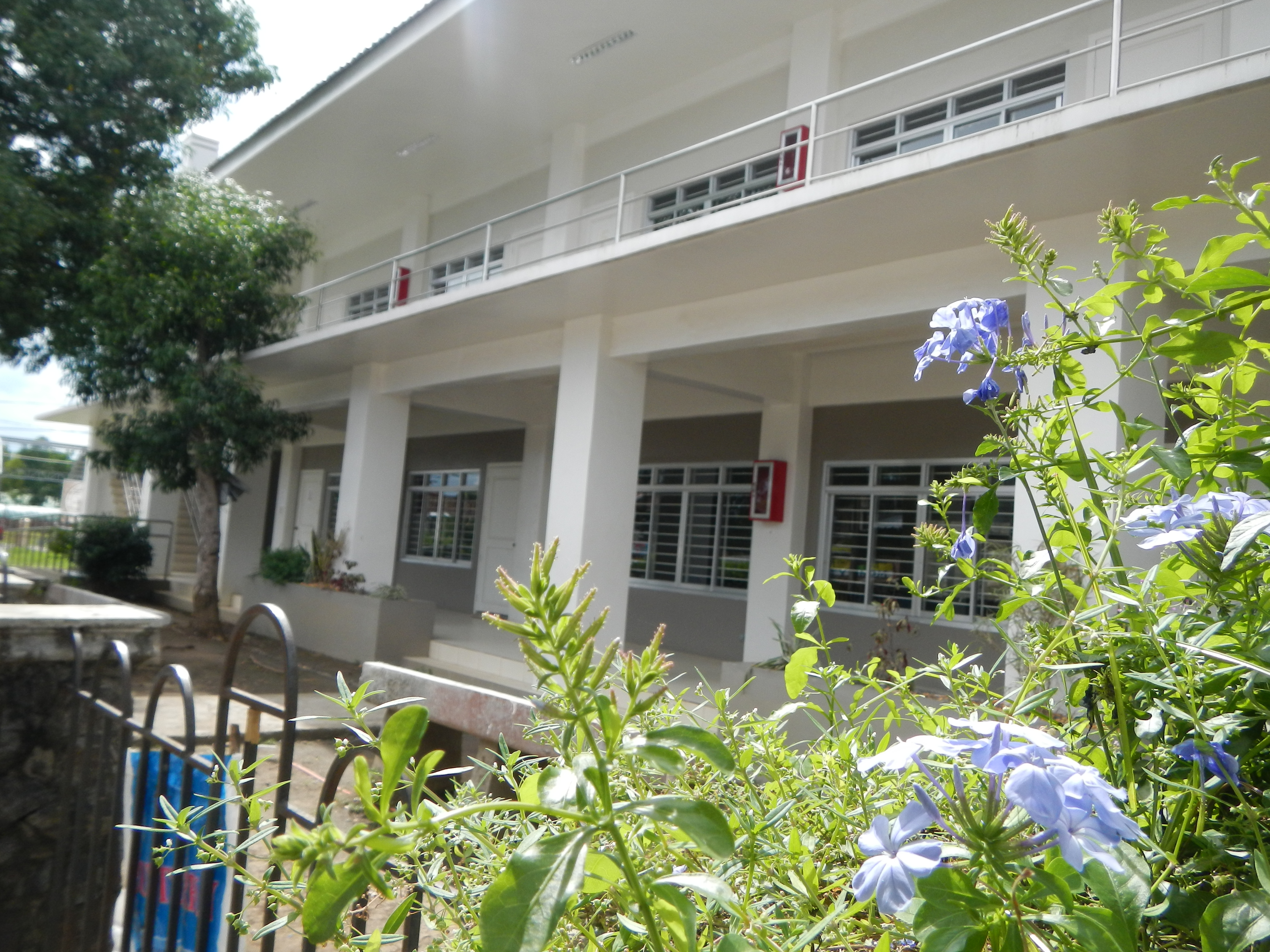
Malvar National High School

The Malvar Schools District Office governs all educational institutions within the municipality. It oversees the management and operations of all private and public, from primary to secondary schools.

=== Primary and elementary schools ===
- The Abba's Orchard Montessori School
- Bagong Pook Elementary School
- Bilucao Elementary School
- Bulihan Elementary School
- Immaculate Conception Montessori School
- Luta Elementary School
- Luta Norte Elementary School
- Malvar Central School
- Miguel L. Aranda Memorial Elementary School
- Mother Hand Educational School
- OB Montessori School
- Payapa Elementary School
- San Fernando Elementary School
- San Gregorio Elementary School
- San Isidro Elementary School
- San Juan Elementary School
- San Juan Sitio Balayan Elementary School
- San Pedro Elementary School
- San Pedro I Elementary School
- San Pioquinto Elementary School
- Southgate Institute of Malvar

=== Secondary schools ===
- Don Julio Leviste Memorial Vocational High School
- Malvar School of Arts and Trade
- Malvar Senior High School
- San Isidro National High School
- Santiago National High School

=== Higher educational institution ===
- Jose P. Laurel Polytechnic College

== Health ==
Apart from the primary Rural Health Unit under DOH-Batangas, Mayor Carlito Reyes founded the Malvar Maternity Clinic a month after taking office. The clinic accepts emergency deliveries and is open 24 hours daily for obstetric and other immediate health services. The clinic has doctors on duty from 7 am to 11 pm on weekdays and around the clock on weekends. RHU personnel serve during the day. Nurses are on duty 24 hours daily, and a midwife is on duty on weeknights. An ambulance is available for patient transfers, and all services are free of charge.

== Tourism ==
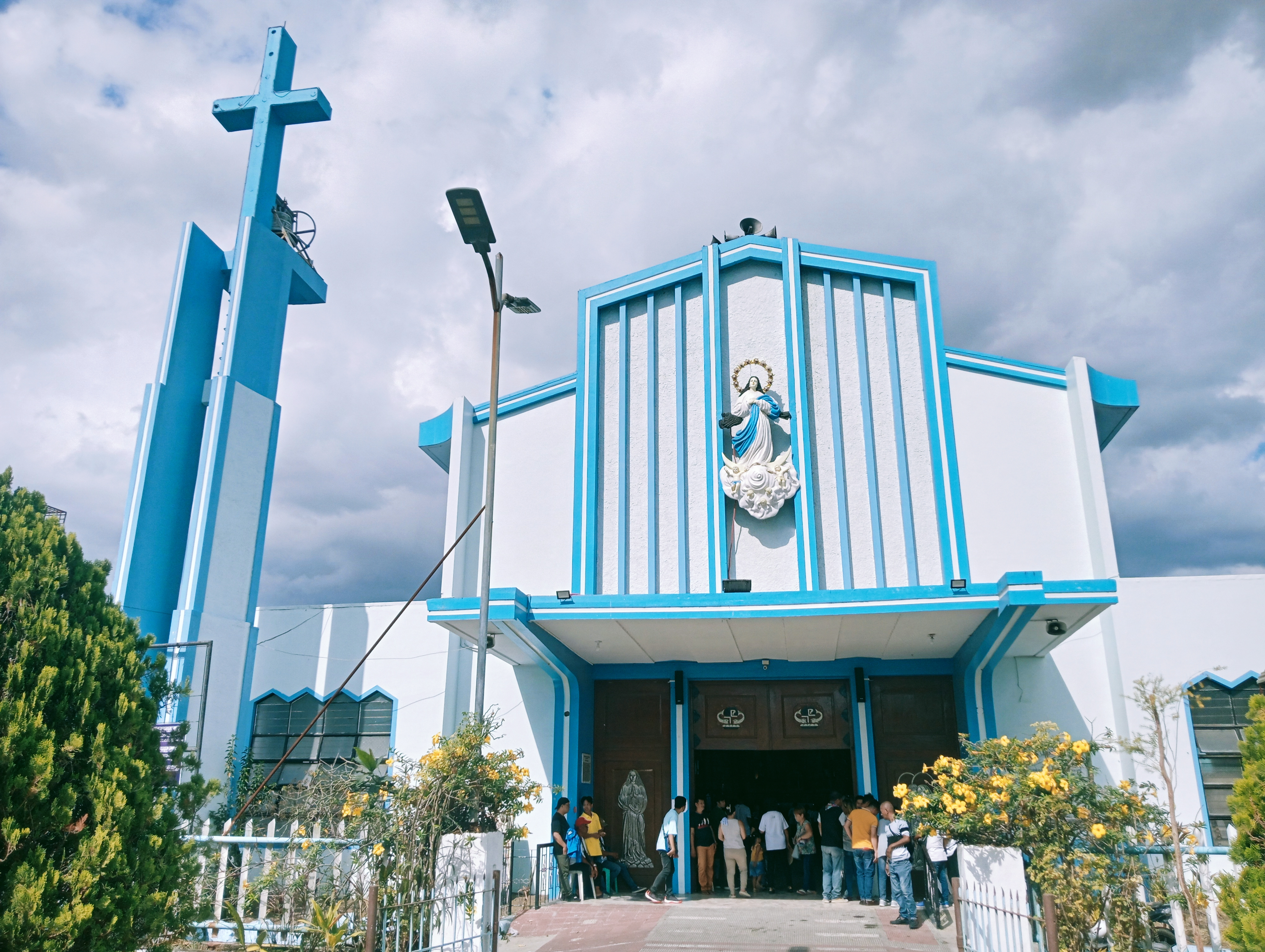
Immaculate Conception Parish Church

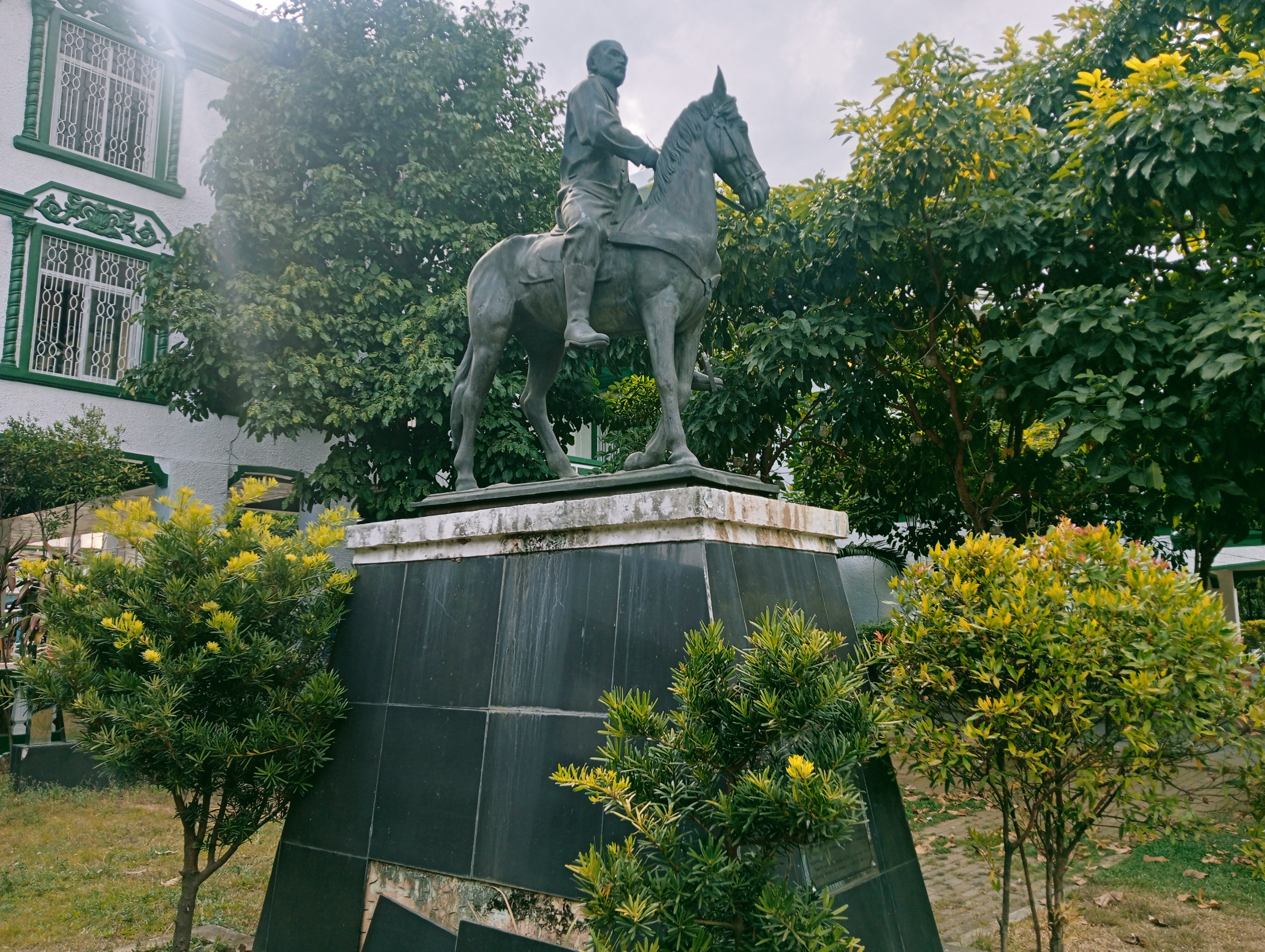
Miguel Malvar Monument

Calejon Falls, in Barangay San Gregorio (formerly known as Calejon), consists of two large waterfalls and two smaller ones. One of the larger falls is about 10 feet (3.0 m) high, with clear water falling into a shallow pool. One of the smaller falls is shower-like, while the other forms a series of small cascades. All the falls are in an area of about 300 square meters (360 sq yd).

The falls are located at the STAR Tollway Bulihan exit. From Manila, buses to Batangas City or Lipa stop at Malvar. Jeepneys and tricycle service are also available from the town. The 5-kilometer (3.1 mi) stretch of road is smoothly paved. There are 300 concrete steps down the river at the falls.

The San Juan River, the longest river in Batangas, connects Lipa, Tanauan and Santo Tomas and is a water source for vegetable and fish farms.

A recently emerged local attraction in the area is a mango farm known as Sa Manggahan. Forty-five minutes away from Alabang, it is near the C-Joist Concrete Ventures Group plant. The country's third Thoroughbred race track (Metro Manila Turf Club Race Track) is in the municipality, as are the Immaculate Conception Parish Church of Malvar and the Miguel Malvar Monument at the Municipal Hall Grounds. The fiesta is celebrated every January 10.

Malvar is slowly establishing its reputation as a conference center in Batangas. In February 2013, the Lima Park Pavilion opened to the public with a concert by the Madrigal Singers. With a capacity of 1,000 the Lima Park Pavilion and Lima Park Hotel are located in Malvar's industrial park, the Lima Technology Center.

=== Landmarks ===
- Batangas State University - Jose P. Laurel Polytechnic College
- Immaculate Conception Parish Church of Malvar
- Metro Manila Turf Club Race Track
- Miguel Malvar Monument
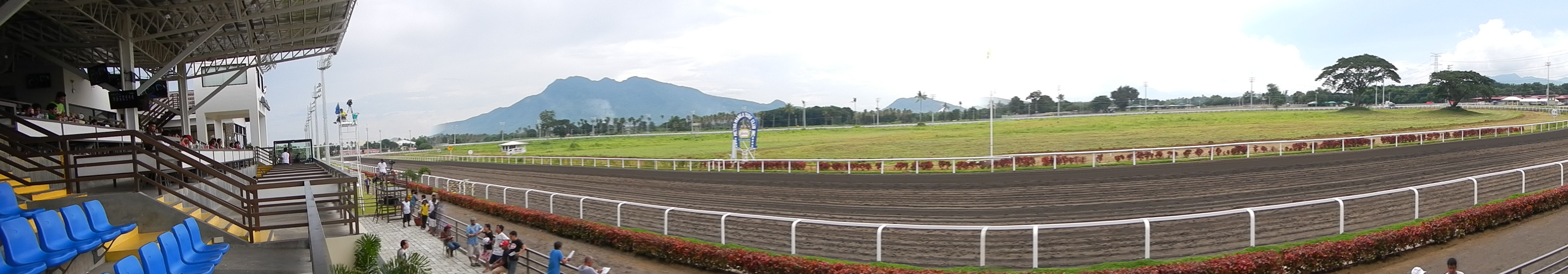
Metro Manila Turf Club Race Track panorama

== Notable personalities ==
- Feliciano Leviste - politician; Batangas governor (1947-1972)
- Jose Antonio Leviste - politician; Batangas governor (1972-1980)
- Rey Publico - basketball player
- Admiral Artemio Abu - Commandant of the Philippine Coast Guard

== See also ==
- Batangas State University Jose P. Laurel Polytechnic College
