= Batangas State University =

Public university in Batangas, Philippines

- Pambansang Pamantasan ng Batangas (Filipino)
- Leading Innovations, Transforming Lives, Building the Nation
- Other name: BatStateU The NEU
- Former names: List: Manual Training School ·; Batangas Trade School ·; Pablo Borbon Memorial Trade School ·; Pablo Borbon Regional School of Arts and Trades ·; Pablo Borbon Memorial Institute of Technology
- Type: State university
- Established: 1903
- Academic affiliations: Association of Universities in Asia and the Pacific
- President: Tirso A. Ronquillo
- Students: 61,000+ (AY 2022–2023)
- Location: Batangas City, Philippines; 13°45′16″N 121°03′12″E
- Campus: Urban Main campus: Rizal Ave, Batangas City
- Colors: Red and white
- Nickname: BatStateU Red Spartans
- Mascot: Red Spartans
- Website: www.batstateu.edu.ph

Batangas State University, The National Engineering University (Filipino: Pambansang Pamantasan ng Batangas; BatStateU The NEU), is a state university in Batangas, Philippines. Established in 1903 as a training school, it is the oldest higher education institution in the region. The institution became a state college in 1968 and was renamed the Pablo Borbon Memorial Institute of Technology. It was elevated to state university status in 2001 and currently has eleven campuses throughout Batangas.

Since 1999, Batangas State University has consistently ranked among the top-performing mechanical engineering schools in the country based on the results of the biannual board examinations.

== History ==
=== Early years ===
Batangas State University was originally established as the Manual Training School in 1903 through the supervision of its first American principal, Mr. Scheer. The institution aimed to train youth for beneficial jobs specifically in woodworking. Two years later, it was renamed Batangas Trade School with Mr. Schartz, Zacarias Canent, Isaias Maclang, and Nad Pascual Magcamit as its principals, successively. The school was destroyed by fire in 1928 and classes were held temporarily at the old government building near the present Basilica of Immaculate Conception church. The construction of the school building at the site of Batangas State University's Main Campus I began in 1932.

After the Liberation, Batangas Trade School resumed activities on 10 September 1945 with Vicente J. Mendoza as its principal. Under the Philippine Rehabilitation Act of 1946, the school was renovated, and the first batch of female students were admitted when courses in food trade, garment, and cosmetology were introduced as a response to the growing need of female workforce.

=== Pablo Borbon era ===
Sometime before 1952, the school was renamed Pablo Borbon Memorial Trade School as a tribute to Pablo Borbon who served as the 6th governor of the Batangas from 1910 to 1916. Through Republic Act No. 741, the school gained a national trade status on 18 June 1952. Again, it was renamed Pablo Borbon Regional School of Arts and Trades on 22 June 1957 as mandated by Republic Act No. 1957. Two months later, Arsenio Galauran became the school superintendent while the institution started to offer technical courses. Galauran was succeeded by Vicente Mendoza in November 1962. Mendoza was then followed by Rosauro de Leon on 8 June 1963. It was during de Leon's administration that the school began to offer terminal classes in auto mechanics, cosmetology, electronics, dressmaking, machine shop practice, and radio mechanics. On 19 June 1965, Republic Act No. 4582 directed the school to offer degree courses in industrial education and industrial arts.

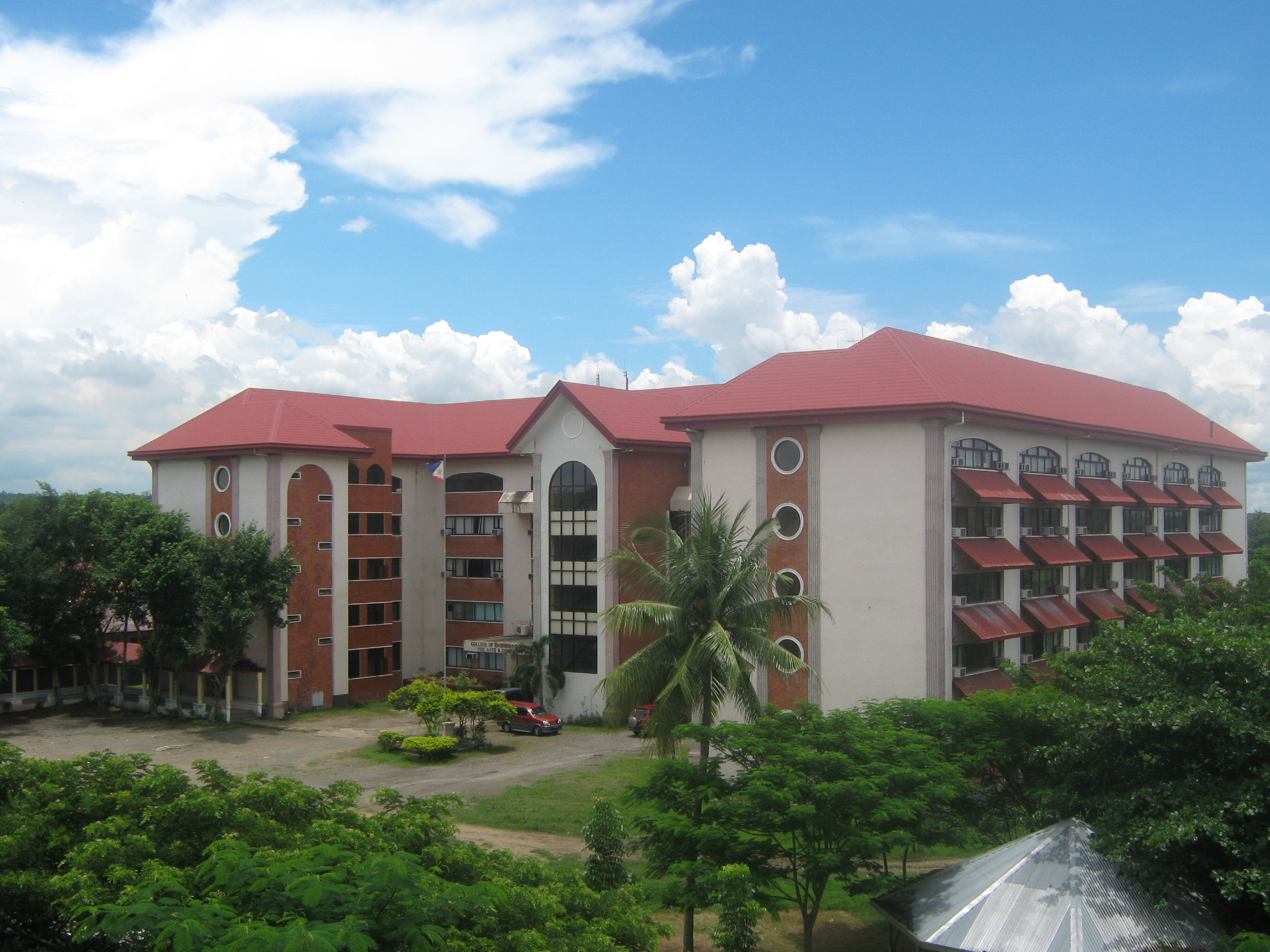
Main II CEAFA Building

As authorized by Republic Act No. 5270, Pablo Borbon Regional School of Arts and Trades was elevated into a state college and renamed Pablo Borbon Memorial Institute of Technology or PBMIT on 15 June 1968. At the time of its conversion, it was the 23rd state college in the country. Rosauro de Leon was appointed to become PBMIT's first president.

In 1971, the newly established state college started to offer courses in electrical and mechanical engineering courses. Sometime before 1973, a secondary school department that came to be known as the Laboratory School was inaugurated. By 1973, Marcos Ato was its principal when the Laboratory School adopted the Revised Secondary Education Program or RSEP. The following year, civil engineering was offered in PBMIT while the Graduate School was formally opened with Master of Arts in Industrial Education major in Administration and Supervision as its pioneer course. This was followed in 1978 when Master of Management specialized in Business and Public Managements was offered in partnership with former U.P. College of Public Administration. Earlier in 1977, PBMIT launched the Extension Trade Training Program that aimed to train out-of-school youth in electricity, food trades, mechanics, practical automotive, and woodcraft in a span of 200 hours.

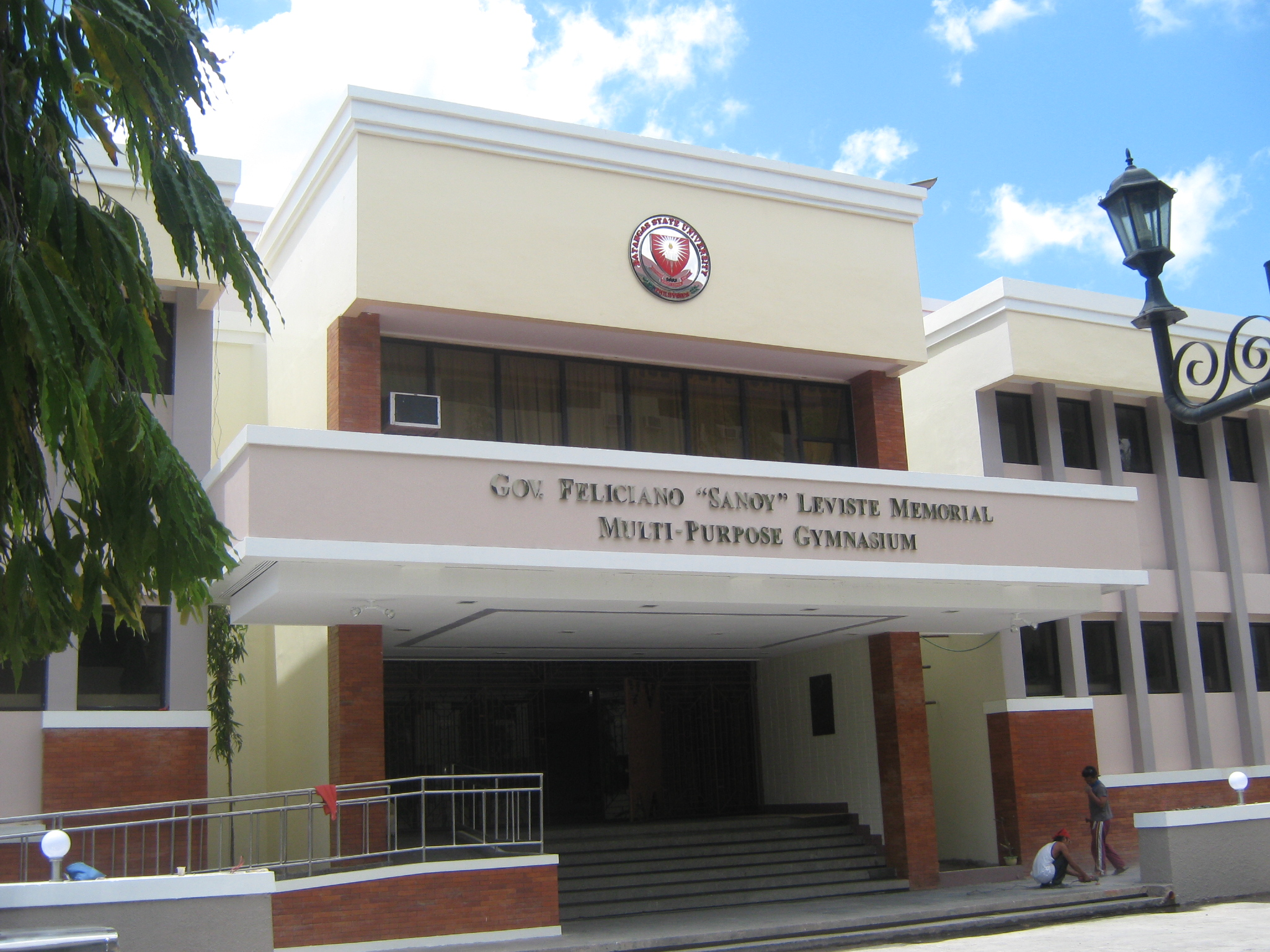
Main I Gymnasium

Isabelo R. Evangelio succeeded de Leon as college president in 1983. A year after Evangelio's ascendancy to the office, PBMIT acquired a three-hectare land in Batangas City. Eventually, this would become the site of Batangas State University's Main Campus II. Evangelio was succeeded by Mariano O. Albayalde in 1986. In the same year, PBMIT broadened its undergraduate programs in home economics, mathematics, and science. In association with Technological University of the Philippines or TUP, a doctoral degree in Industrial Education Management was offered in 1987. A science class with emphasis in mathematics and science of the Special Science Curriculum was piloted in the Laboratory School from 1987 to 1990 through the supervision of its principal, Mercedes del Rosario.

Albayalde's presidency was superseded by Ernesto M. De Chavez in 1989. Courses in English language, elementary and secondary educations, and computer science were made available the subsequent year. Simultaneously, PBMIT spearheaded the Dual Training System or DTS that was intended for aspiring technicians. DTS was conducted on a trimester basis; classes were held four days a week in industry and two days in school. By 1991, two more courses in development communication and biology were offered. Starting from 1993, the Laboratory School adopted the Technology Based-Curriculum to conform with PBMIT's Science Education Program. Together with Philippine Science High School and Quezon City Science High School, the three were the first secondary schools in the Philippines to adopt the aforementioned curriculum. In 1994, an extension campus was opened in Balayan with welding fabrication and automotive, electrical, and electronics technologies as its premier courses.

From 1995 to 2000, numerous courses in various disciplines were introduced. Some of there were architecture, business administration, chemical engineering, sanitary engineering, fine arts, information technology, psychology, and public administration. The former College of Liberal Arts, Science, and Computer Studies; School of Accountancy, Business and Economics, Center of Gender, and Poverty Studies; and School of Food Science were established. A separate department for primary students was created that offered Kindergarten I and II in preschool and Grade I in elementary.

=== 21st century ===
Presidents of
PBMIT and BatStateU
Rosauro de Leon, 1968–1983
Isabelo R. Evangelio, 1983–1986
Mariano O. Albayalde, 1986–1989
Ernesto M. De Chavez, 1989–2006
Nora L. Magnaye, 2006–2014
Tirso A. Ronquillo, 2014–present

On 22 March 2001, Pablo Borbon Memorial Institute of Technology was converted into Batangas State University by virtue of Republic Act No. 9045. Ernesto M. De Chavez became the university's first president. The conversion also led to the unification of the Grade School Department and the Laboratory School from which the Integrated School came into existence with Maxima Ramos as its first director. However, in 2005, De Chavez and three of his staff were fired by Ombudsman Simeon V. Marcelo for dishonesty and grave misconduct. His term officially ended on 17 April 2006 and he would be convicted with graft in the ensuing years. On 17 July 2006, Nora L. Magnaye assumed as the university's second president and the first woman to hold the position. Her presidency inherited a huge debt from the previous administration; thus, the university resolved to enter debt settlements with its creditors. Some ₱300 million were allocated for the rehabilitation of the school's facilities, continuation of several unfinished buildings, and construction of new infrastructures. Batangas State University started to establish ties with different universities and colleges in Malaysia, South Korea, Thailand, and Vietnam.

In 2013, Magnaye was briefly suspended by the Ombudsman for barring her predecessor to teach in the university but nevertheless held her post until her term expired on 16 July 2014. She was succeeded by Tirso A. Ronquillo two days later. In the following months, Batangas State University unveiled its official mascot, the Red Spartans. Since 2015, several infrastructures of the university's main campuses have undergone massive renovations. In compliance with Republic Act No. 7797, the board of regents decided to move the university's academic calendar from June–March to August–May starting in 2016. This was also done to align the university's academic calendar with that of the ASEAN and the international community. A sharp decrease in number of students that were enrolled in the university was noted in 2016 largely because of the full implementation of the country's K-12 curriculum. In an evening fellowship on 19 November 2016, a 15-meter (49 ft) marker named Tower of Wisdom was inaugurated in Main Campus I to commemorate the 113th founding anniversary of Batangas State University.

=== Declaration of Batangas State University as The National Engineering University ===
Batangas State University makes history after being declared as the Philippines’ National Engineering University on April 11, 2022, by virtue of Republic Act No. 11694.

As the National Engineering University, it is mandated to provide excellent education and research in the field of engineering. This includes expanding and strengthening its current 46 engineering degree programs at the undergraduate and graduate levels. Also, BatStateU The NEU is expected to conduct relevant research and development activities to promote the advancement of the engineering industry in the country.

On July 11, 2022, a ceremonial declaration was held at BatStateU-Pablo Borbon Campus, which officially recognized Batangas State University as the premier center of excellence in engineering education in the country. Following the ceremonial declaration, Batangas State University will embark on fulfilling its distinctive and purposeful mandate as The National Engineering University. This will also mark the beginning of the country’s quest to build the nation through quality engineering education.

== Campuses ==
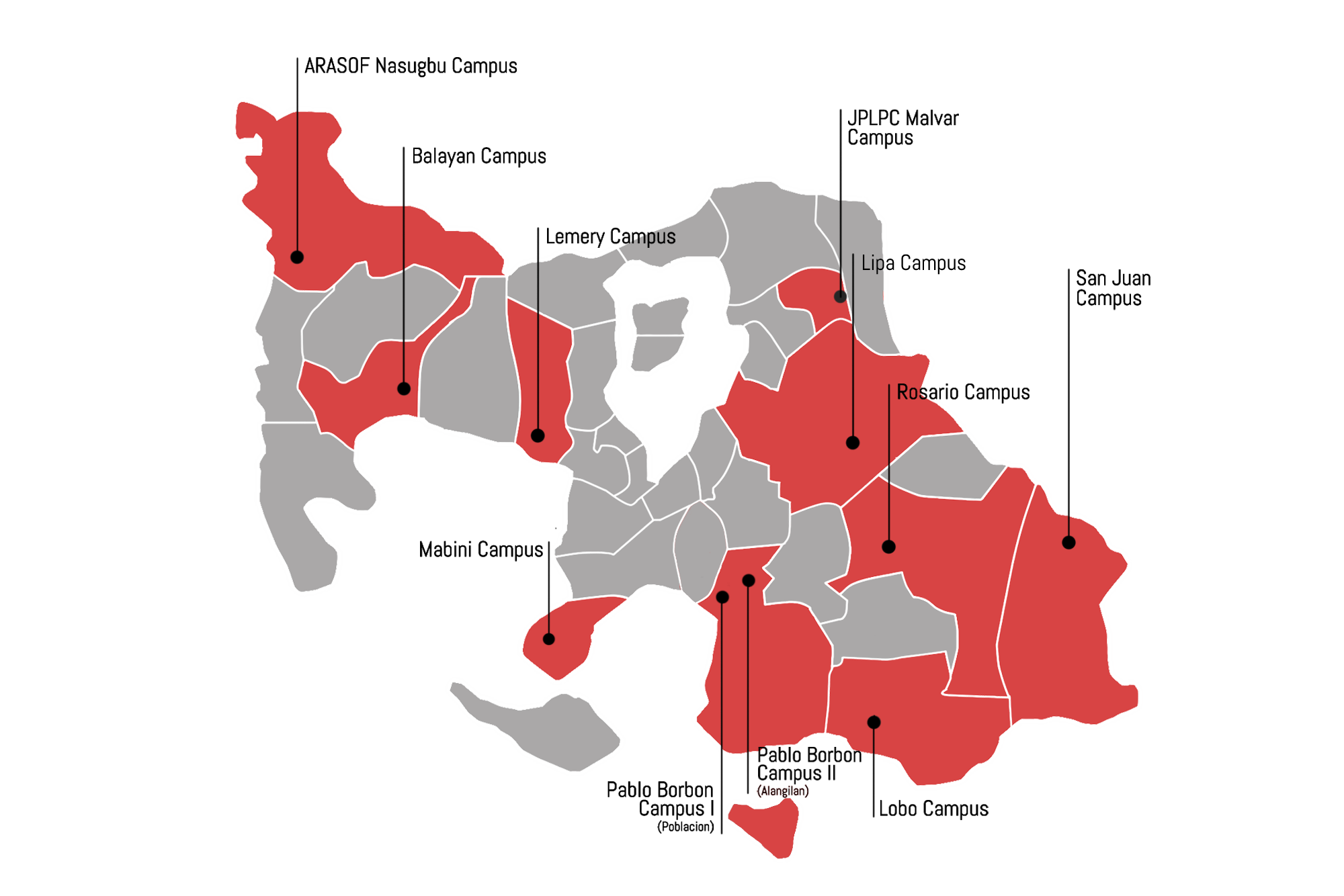

Since 2003, Batangas State University has two main, two satellites, and seven extension campuses in Batangas. To maintain camaraderie between its campuses, the university administers several annual activities like quiz bees and intramurals.

The university's main campuses are located in Batangas City; Governor Pablo Borbon Main I is at Rizal Avenue, Poblacion while Governor Pablo Borbon Main II is within Golden Country Homes Subdivision in Brgy. Alangilan. Both are named in honor of former governor Pablo Borbon. Being the oldest of all the campuses, Main I is the site of the former Batangas Trade School which was established in 1932. Since then, Main I has been the flagship campus and the seat of the administration of the university. The site of the second oldest campus, Main II, was acquired in 1984.

On 25 February 2000, the Apolinario R. Apacible School of Fisheries or ARASOF in Brgy. Bucana, Nasugbu was incorporated to the former Pablo Borbon Memorial Institute of Technology as its first satellite campus. With the implementation of Republic Act No. 9045, two more satellite campuses were incorporated to the then newly formed Batangas State University; this were Jose P. Laurel Polytechnic College or JPLPC in Poblacion, Malvar and a branch of the Polytechnic University of the Philippines or PUP in Poblacion, Santo Tomas. However, the law was criticized by the staffs and students of PUP Santo Tomas who deemed it unjustified. Eventually on 22 May 2007, Congress enacted Republic Act No. 9472 that excluded PUP Santo Tomas from Batangas State University.

Earlier in 1994, the university's third oldest and first extension campus was inaugurated in Brgy. Caloocan, Balayan. In 2000, a memorandum of agreement was signed for the purpose of establishing more extension campuses in Lipa City, Rosario, Lobo, San Juan, Calaca, Padre Garcia, San Pascual, and Taysan although the opening of such campuses in the latter four municipalities did not materialize. The said campus in Brgy. Marawoy, Lipa City was named Don Claro M. Recto campus as a tribute to the well-known Filipino politician while the one in Brgy. Namunga, Rosario was named Jose B. Zuño campus in honor of Rosario's first postwar mayor. The extension campuses in Lobo and San Juan were constructed in Brgy. Masaguitsit and Brgy. Talahiban, respectively. On 23 May 2003, another extension campus was founded in Brgy. Bagong Sikat, Lemery. More than a decade later, a ceremony was held on 8 June 2017 for the commencement of the construction of an extension campus in Mabini; this campus, which was the university's youngest, opened on 6 August 2018.

== University service motto ==
"Leading Innovations, Transforming Lives, Building the Nation" is the official service motto of the university. Following the declaration of Batangas State University as The National Engineering University in 2022, it embraced a new-fangled mandate to build the nation in response to the call for engineering advancement in the country.

== New academic programs ==
In 2022, BatStateU made a move towards the future by receiving approval to offer 27 new academic programs in engineering and allied fields. This positions BatStateU as a leader in preparing students for the dynamic and in-demand industries of the future.

One of the new academic programs offered in the same year was the Doctor of Medicine degree under the College of Medicine at BatStateU-Pablo Borbon Campus. This program is being offered in accordance with Republic Act No. 11509, also known as the "Doktor Para sa Bayan Act," which aims to increase the number of medical doctors in the country by providing scholarships and other forms of financial assistance to students from underprivileged backgrounds. More so, this will provide students with the knowledge and skills necessary to become competent and compassionate medical professionals and help address the shortage of doctors in the Philippines. Graduates from this program will be eligible to take the Physician Licensure Exam (PLE) and practice medicine in the country.

== Library and laboratories ==
Batangas State University has invested in technology and laboratories to give students access to more interactive learning tools and a more comprehensive learning experience. Some of these are:

=== BatStateU Science, Technology, Engineering, Agriculture, and Mathematics (STEAM) Library ===
As a part of its digitization initiatives, the STEAM Library will be advancing its digital security and privacy systems, as radio-frequency identification (RFID) sensors will be installed - a huge step from the electro-magnetic strips of the old library. The access for research publications and journals will also be easier, as an Electronic Thesis and Dissertation (ETD) section will also be uncovered. Moreover, resource materials for Asian, European and American studies also secured its section at the library. Other rooms and facilities such as the University Shop, an accreditation room, multimedia room, audio visual room, discussion rooms, reading areas and an indoor garden will also be housed at the STEAM Library.

=== Science, Technology, Engineering, and Environment Research (STEER) Hub) ===
Situated in the technology campus in Alangilan, Batangas City, the hub is equipped with laboratories for different fields, lecture rooms for small and large class, conference room, a FabLab and an open space at the fifth floor that can be used during hosting of symposium or workshop.

=== Learning Development Center ===
With a total floor area of 1,731.91 square meters, the first Learning Development Center (LDC) of Batangas State University- Integrated School is a three-storey building.
