= Jose P. Laurel Polytechnic College =

Public college in Batangas, Philippines

- Politeknikang Kolehiyo ng Jose P. Laurel (Filipino)
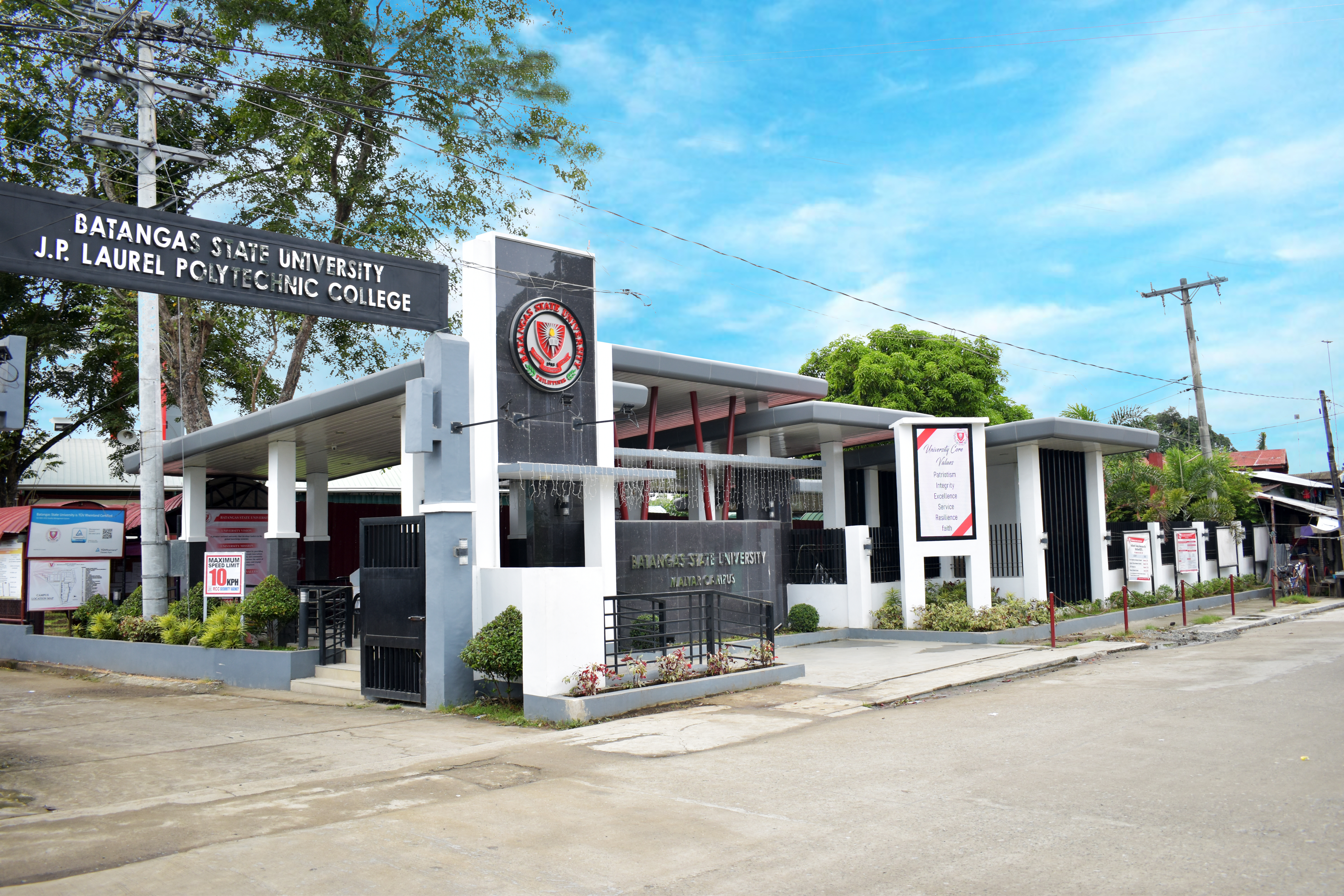
- Facade of the campus (Note: JPLPC is a part of Batangas State University's system. The campus does not utilize a separate seal.)
- Other name: JPLPC Malvar
- Former names: Jose P. Laurel, Sr. Memorial School of Arts and Trades (1968–1992); Jose P. Laurel Polytechnic College (1992–2001); BatStateU The NEU JPLPC-Malvar Campus (2001–present)
- Motto: Leading Innovations, Transforming Lives, Building the Nation
- Type: State university · Satellite campus
- Established: June 15, 1968; 58 years ago
- Affiliations: PASUC · SCUAA
- President: Tirso A. Ronquillo
- Location: Malvar, Batangas, Philippines; 14°02′41″N 121°09′24″E
- Newspaper: The LASER
- Colors: Red and White
- Nickname: Laurelian
- Mascot: Red Spartans
- Website: www.batstate-u.edu.ph
- Location in Luzon Location in the Philippines

Jose P. Laurel Polytechnic College (JPLPC; Filipino: Politeknikang Kolehiyo ng Jose P. Laurel) is a satellite campus of Batangas State University located in Malvar, Batangas, Philippines. It is one of the two satellite campuses of Batangas State University, the other being Apolinario R. Apacible School of Fisheries.

The JPLPC-Malvar Campus university program offerings are recognized by the country's Commission on Higher Education. At the moment, the campus has six academic departments.

== History ==
By the virtue of Republic Act No. 5417, then known as Jose P. Laurel, Sr. Memorial School of Arts and Trades was established on June 15, 1968. Many years later, on May 21, 1992, the school was elevated into a college and was renamed Jose P. Laurel Polytechnic College through Republic Act No. 7518.

On March 22, 2001, as authorized by Republic Act No. 9045, Jose P. Laurel Polytechnic College was eventually integrated into Batangas State University as its satellite campus.

== Campus ==
J.P. Laurel Polytechnic College (JPLPC) Malvar serves as Batangas State University's third-largest campus. It is a 3.26-hectare property located in G. Leviste St., Poblacion, Malvar, Batangas, approximately 68 kilometers south of Manila.

== See also ==
- Batangas State University
