= 2019 Tanauan local elections =

2019 Tanauan mayoral election
- May 13, 2019
Nominee	Mary Angeline Halili	Sonia Aquino	Alfredo Corona
Party	UNA	Lakas	Nacionalista
Running mate	Herminigildo Trinidad, Jr.		Marissa Tabing
Popular vote	41,757	27,381	20,132
Percentage	45.99	30.16	22.17
Mayor before election
Jhoanna Corona-Villamor
Nacionalista
Elected mayor
Mary Angeline Halili
UNA

Tanauan City held its local elections on Monday, May 13, 2019, as a part of the 2019 Philippine general election. The voters will elect candidates for the elective local posts in the city: the mayor, vice mayor, and the 10 members of its city council.

== Background ==
Jhoanna Corona-Villamor was installed as mayor of Tanauan, following the assassination of then-incumbent Mayor Antonio Halili, who served as City Mayor from 2013 on July 2, 2018, while attending the flag-raising ceremony at the Tanauan City Hall. Halili was the second incumbent local chief executive of Tanauan to be assassinated following former Mayor Cesar Platon who was assassinated in 2001 while campaigning for governor of Batangas. Halili gained public attention because of the walk of shame campaign against criminality and illegal drugs.

Corona-Villamor entered politics in 2010 when she was elected city councilor and as the first female city vice mayor in 2013. She is also the second female local chief executive next to Sonia Torres-Aquino. Instead of running for her first full three-year term, she is seeking a seat in the Batangas Provincial Board representing the 3rd District of Batangas, switching places with her father, former mayor and incumbent 3rd district board member Alfredo Corona.

Corona was a former Kabataang Barangay Chairman, municipal councilor, vice mayor and became the first elected city mayor of Tanauan in 2001 until he was deposed in 2006 following the assumption of Sonia Torres Aquino who was declared by the Commission on Elections and the Supreme Court as the real winner in the 2004 mayoralty race.

Mary Angeline Halili, the daughter of assassinated mayor Antonio Halili is also joining the mayoralty race. She is running under the United Nationalist Alliance.

== Mayoralty and Vice Mayoralty Elections ==
=== Mayor ===
Incumbent Mayor Jhoanna Corona-Villamor who assumed office as Mayor after the assassination of Mayor Antonio Halili on July 2, 2018, is running for provincial board member. She will be switching places with his father, incumbent Board Member Alfredo Corona.

Tanauan City mayoralty elections
Party	Candidate	Votes	%
UNA	Mary Angeline Halili	41,757	45.99
Lakas	Sonia Aquino	27,381	30.16
Nacionalista	Alfredo Corona	20,132	22.17
Independent	Jesusa Garcia	1,217	1.34
Independent	Marcos Valdez	245	0.26
Independent	Pedrito Carandang	51	0.05
Margin of victory		14,376	15.42%
Valid ballots		90,783	97.40%
Invalid or blank votes		2,247	24.11%
Total votes		93,210	100%
UNA gain from Nacionalista			

=== Vice Mayor ===
Tanauan City vice mayoralty elections
Party	Candidate	Votes	%
UNA	Herminigildo Trinidad, Jr.	50,111	58.19
Nacionalista	Marissa Tabing	31,533	36.61
Independent	Mary Jane Reyes	3,317	3.87
Independent	Salvador Quimo	1,128	1.30
Margin of victory		18,578	19.93%
Valid ballots		86,109	92.38%
Invalid or blank votes		7,101	76.18%
Total votes		93,210	100%
UNA gain from Nacionalista			

== City Council ==
Incumbents are expressed in italics.

=== By ticket ===
==== Team Corona-Tabing ====
Nacionalista/Team Corona-Tabing
Name	Party	Result
Angel Atienza	Nacionalista	Won
Maria Theresa Awitan	Nacionalista	Lost
Divina Balba	Nacionalista	Lost
Mario Braza	Nacionalista	Lost
Eva Canobas	Nacionalista	Lost
Benedicto Corona	Nacionalista	Won
Cristel Guelos	Nacionalista	Won
Arthur Lirio	Nacionalista	Lost
Jun Llanto	Nacionalista	Lost
Javie Eric Manglo	Nacionalista	Lost

==== Team Halili-Trinidad ====
UNA/Team Halili-Trinidad
Name	Party	Result
Joseph Castillo	UNA	Won
Herman De Sagun	UNA	Won
Glen Win Gonzales	UNA	Won
Epimaco Magpantay	UNA	Lost
Jay-Ar Manaig	UNA	Lost
Czylene Marqueses	UNA	Won
Jojo Nones	UNA	Lost
Simeon Platon	UNA	Won
Herman Trinidad	UNA	Won
Eugene Yson	UNA	Lost

=== Councilors ===
2019 Tanauan City Council Elections
Party	Candidate	Votes	%
UNA	Joseph Castillo	37,464	
UNA	Herman Trinidad	37,151	
UNA	Simeon Platon	36,277	
UNA	Czylene Marqueses	33,910	
Independent	Angel Burgos	32,114	
UNA	Glen Win Gonzales	30,066	
Nacionalista	Angel Atienza	29,593	
Nacionalista	Benedicto Corona	29,139	
Nacionalista	Cristel Guellos	28,455	
UNA	Herman De Sagun	28,337	
UNA	Eugene Yson	28,151	
UNA	Jay-Ar Manaig	27,547	
Nacionalista	Javie Manglo	26,069	
Independent	Eva Canobas	26,042	
UNA	Jojo Nones	25,504	
Nacionalista	Arthur Lirio	22,805	
Nacionalista	Jun Llanto	21,566	
Nacionalista	Divina Balba	21,456	
Nacionalista	Maria Theresa Awitan	20,947	
UNA	Jon-Jon Magpantay	20,184	
Independent	Lino Rustia	18,748	
Independent	Ruel Micosa	17,190	
Independent	Lucky Nuñez	16,331	
Independent	Felipe Magpantay	15,307	
Nacionalista	Mario Braza	14,696	
Independent	Kae Nones	14,689	
Independent	Phin Maie Perez	14,296	
Independent	Polmark Fajardo	13,815	
Independent	Marivic Niega	9,238	
Independent	Alberto Villanueva	5,088	
Independent	Mcdo Mendoza	1,628	
Independent	Beloy Lopeña	1,361	
Independent	Demar Sanvictores	1,142	
Total votes		706,306	100.00%
