= 2022 Batangas local elections =

2022 Batangas gubernatorial election
- May 9, 2022
- Gubernatorial election
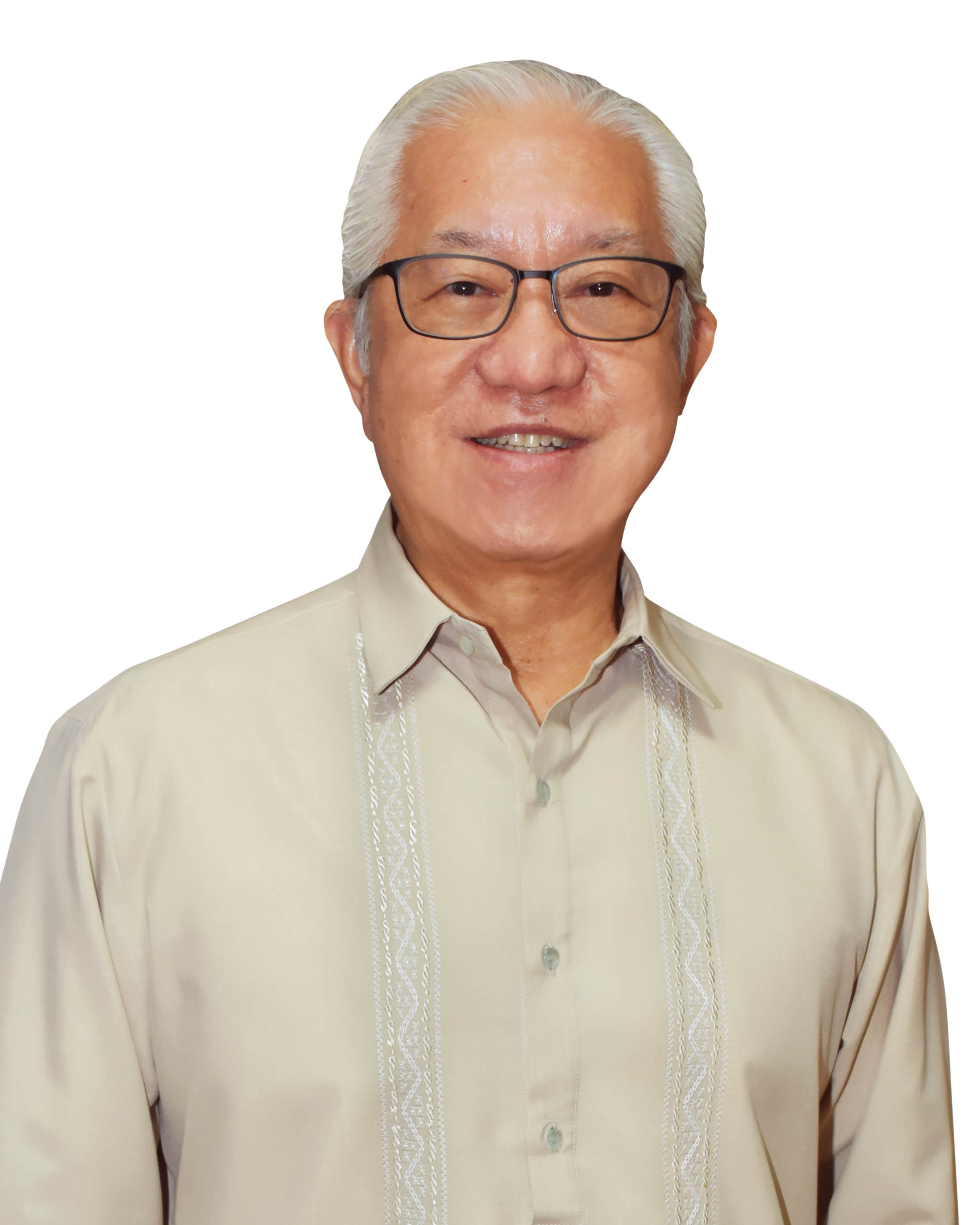
		NPC
Nominee	Hermilando Mandanas	Prudencio Gutierrez
Party	PDP–Laban	NPC
Running mate	Mark Leviste	Anton Hernandez (PPP)
Popular vote	927,698	391,773
Percentage	69.50	29.35
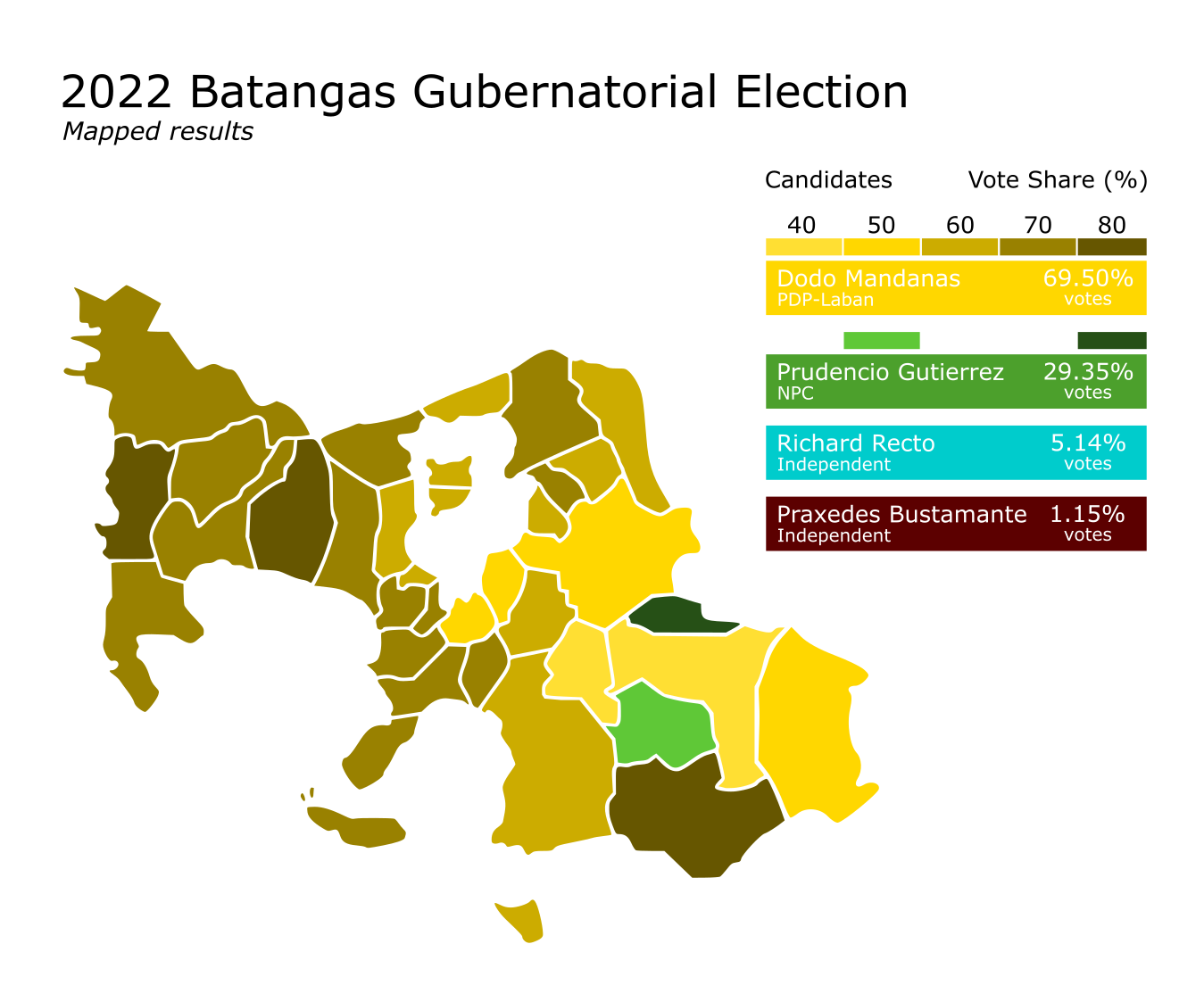
- Gubernatorial election results by City and Municipality.
Governor before election
Hermilando Mandanas
PDP–Laban
Elected Governor
Hermilando Mandanas
PDP–Laban
- Vice gubernatorial election
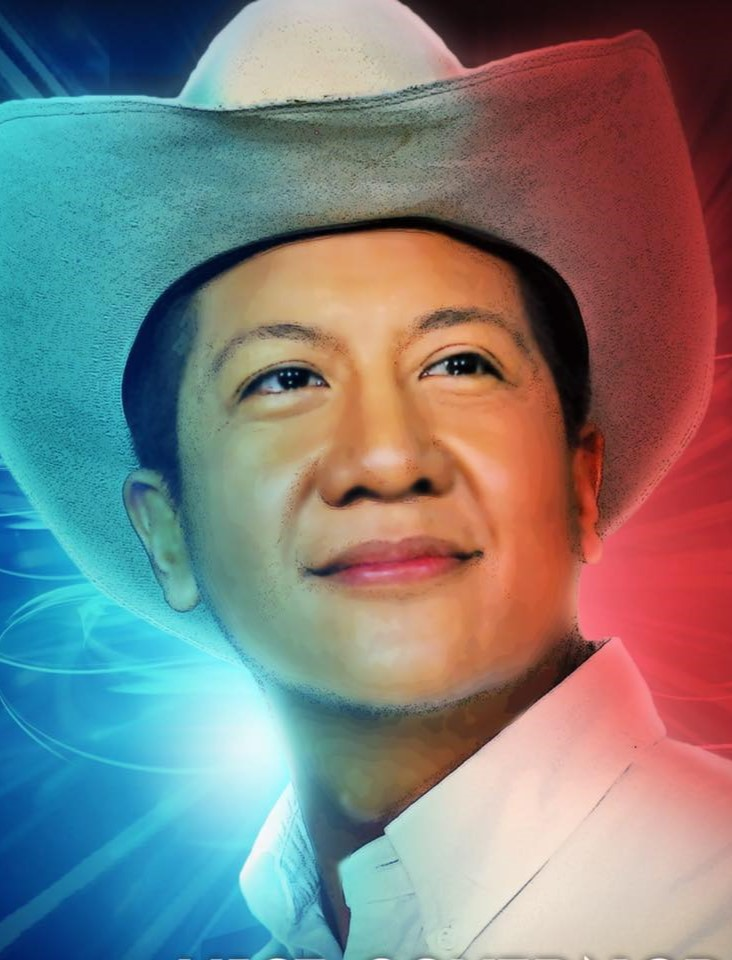
		PPP
Nominee	Mark Leviste	Anton Hernandez
Party	PDP–Laban	PPP
Popular vote	1,010,275	302,515
Percentage	76.96	23.04
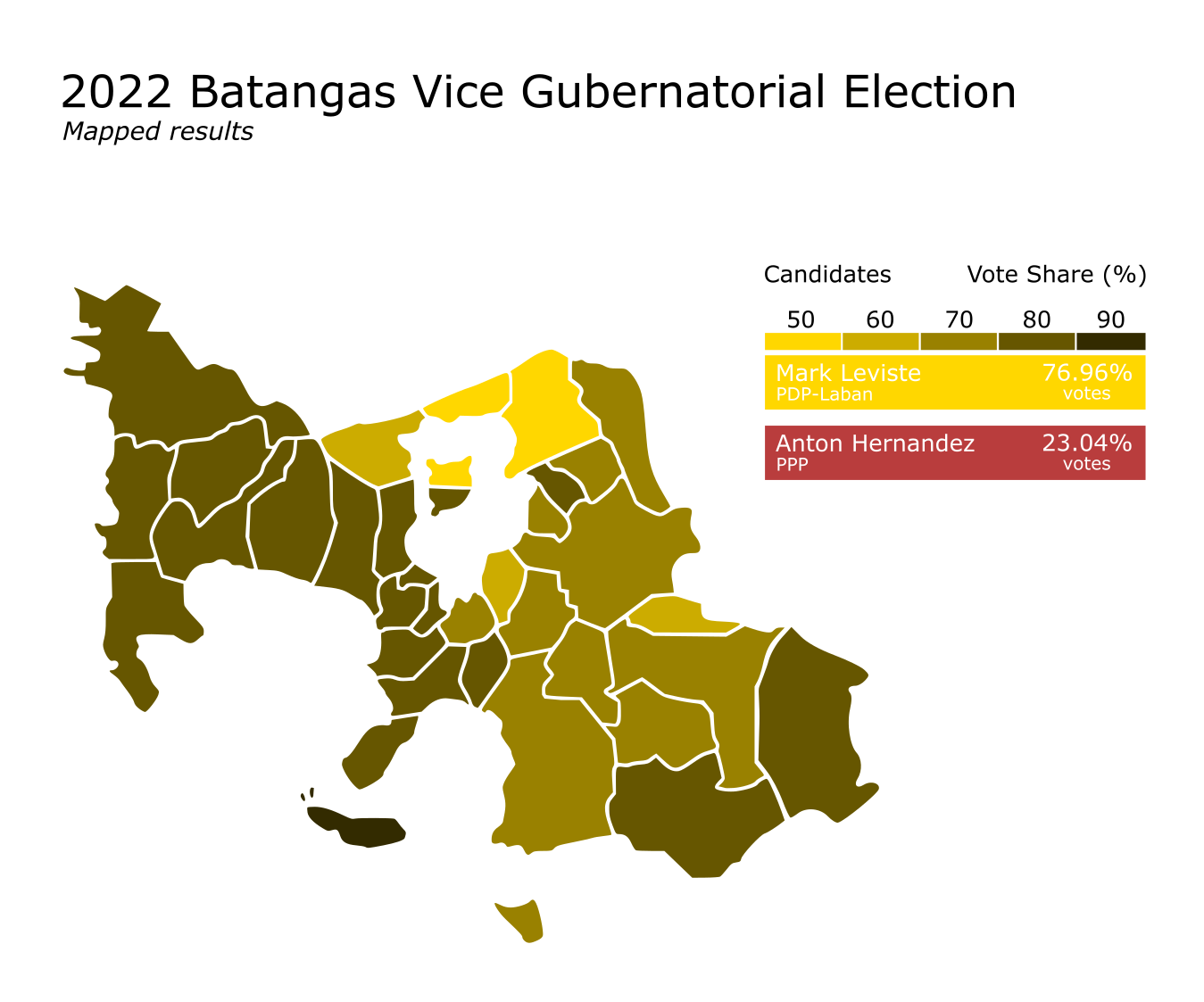
- Vice Gubernatorial election results by City and Municipality.
Vice Governor before election
Mark Leviste
PDP–Laban
Elected Vice Governor
Mark Leviste
PDP–Laban

Local elections were held in the province of Batangas on May 9, 2022 as part of the 2022 general election. Voters will select candidates for all local positions: a town mayor, vice mayor and town councilors, as well as members of the Sangguniang Panlalawigan, the vice-governor, governor and for the six districts of Batangas.

== Provincial elections ==
=== Governor ===
Incumbent Governor Hermilando Mandanas is running for his sixth nonconsecutive term. His opponents are Praxedes Bustamante and former Padre Garcia mayor Prudencio Gutierrez.

Batangas gubernatorial election
Party	Candidate	Votes	%
PDP–Laban	Dodo Mandanas	927,698	69.50%
NPC	Prudencio Gutierrez	391,773	29.35%
Independent	Richard Recto (withdrew)	72,430	5.14%
Independent	Praxedes Bustamante	15,338	1.15%
Total votes		1,334,809	100.00%
PDP–Laban hold			

==== Per City/Municipality ====
City/Municipality	Dodo Mandanas		Prudencio Gutierrez		Richard Recto (withdrew)		Praxedes Bustamante	
City/Municipality	Votes	%	Votes	%	Votes	%	Votes	%
Agoncillo	14,064	68.49	5,486	26.72	818	3.98	165	0.80
Alitagtag	8,769	58.32	5,670	37.71	499	3.32	97	0.65
Balayan	34,533	77.92	6,829	15.41	2,529	5.71	426	0.96
Balete	8,602	73.57	2,340	20.01	673	5.76	78	0.67
Batangas City	118,909	68.52	49,324	28.42	3,954	2.28	1,351	0.78
Bauan	36,666	77.96	8,898	18.92	1,177	2.50	291	0.62
Calaca	37,788	80.96	6,256	13.40	2,266	4.85	366	0.78
Calatagan	17,729	72.13	4,079	16.60	2,411	9.81	360	1.46
Cuenca	12,067	59.45	7,117	35.06	905	4.46	208	1.02
Ibaan	15,771	48.60	15,298	47.15	1,143	3.52	236	0.73
Laurel	14,286	72.70	4,270	21.73	937	4.77	157	0.80
Lemery	29,544	72.01	8,351	20.35	2,738	6.67	397	0.97
Lian	22,593	85.31	2,483	9.38	1,174	4.43	232	0.88
Lipa	96,123	54.03	67,977	38.21	11,625	6.53	2,185	1.23
Lobo	17,153	81.30	3,172	15.03	674	3.19	99	0.47
Mabini	18,944	76.70	5,070	20.53	547	2.21	139	0.56
Malvar	18,497	66.72	6,873	24.79	1,964	6.98	419	1.91
Mataasnakahoy	10,287	63.26	4,975	30.59	851	5.23	148	0.91
Nasugbu	46,932	78.42	8,068	13.48	4,041	6.75	807	1.35
Padre Garcia	3,931	14.38	23,030	84.22	290	1.06	95	0.35
Rosario	31,572	47.80	31,092	47.08	2,956	4.48	426	0.65
San Jose	26,888	63.72	12,407	29.40	2,540	6.02	360	0.85
San Juan	31,199	56.41	19,030	34.41	4,299	7.77	781	1.41
San Luis	15,473	76.43	4,042	19.97	609	3.01	120	0.59
San Nicolas	7,791	64.76	3,387	28.15	718	5.97	134	1.11
San Pascual	24,949	75.15	7,388	22.26	631	1.90	229	0.69
Santa Teresita	7,348	72.03	2,375	23.28	407	3.99	72	0.71
Santo Tomas	55,972	68.79	15,863	19.50	7,108	8.74	2,426	2.98
Taal	21,478	73.62	6,058	20.77	1,405	4.82	233	0.80
Talisay	14,601	66.42	5,662	25.76	1,451	6.60	268	1.22
Tanauan	74,250	70.97	21,980	21.01	6,717	6.42	1,671	1.60
Taysan	9,974	44.24	11,561	51.28	832	3.69	180	0.80
Tingloy	6,433	75.25	1,864	21.80	217	2.54	35	0.41
Tuy	16,582	76.94	3,498	16.23	1,276	5.92	197	0.91
TOTAL	927,698	69.50	391,773	29.35	72,430	5.14	15,338	1.15

=== Vice governor ===
Incumbent Jose Antonio Leviste II is running for reelection. His opponent is former DSWD Undersecretary Jose Antonio Hernandez.

Batangas vice gubernatorial election
Party	Candidate	Votes	%
PDP–Laban	Mark Leviste	1,010,275	76.96%
PPP	Anton Hernandez	302,515	23.04%
Total votes		1,312,790	100.00%
PDP–Laban hold			

==== Per City/Municipality ====
City/Municipality	Mark Leviste		Jose Antonio Hernandez	
City/Municipality	Votes	%	Votes	%
Agoncillo	16,167	86.25	2,577	13.75
Alitagtag	10,895	77.07	3,268	22.93
Balayan	37,660	89.18	4,567	10.82
Balete	8,842	81.41	2,019	18.59
Batangas City	117,623	73.35	42,726	26.65
Bauan	36,808	86.93	5,534	13.07
Calaca	38,113	87.24	5,576	12.76
Calatagan	20,330	89.01	2,511	10.99
Cuenca	12,202	63.04	7,153	36.96
Ibaan	23,203	77.91	6,579	22.09
Laurel	12,194	64.63	6,674	35.37
Lemery	33,742	89.16	4,102	10.84
Lian	20,915	84.59	3,811	15.41
Lipa	122,532	73.81	43,482	26.19
Lobo	15,422	85.89	2,533	14.11
Mabini	19,271	87.98	2,634	12.02
Malvar	19,403	73.08	7,147	26.92
Mataasnakahoy	12,199	79.77	3,094	20.23
Nasugbu	45,736	81.84	10,152	18.16
Padre Garcia	16,153	69.64	7,043	30.36
Rosario	48,276	79.20	12,676	20.80
San Jose	30,167	76.03	9,510	23.97
San Juan	41,070	80.13	10,182	19.87
San Luis	15,325	83.01	3,136	16.99
San Nicolas	9,361	83.96	1,789	16.04
San Pascual	24,717	82.52	5,234	17.48
Santa Teresita	8,512	89.32	1,018	10.68
Santo Tomas	56,219	70.63	23,374	29.37
Taal	23,713	87.17	3,491	12.83
Talisay	12,425	57.53	9,173	42.47
Tanauan	60,713	58.85	42,445	41.15
Taysan	15,861	78.23	4,413	21.77
Tingloy	6,793	92.54	548	7.46
Tuy	17,623	88.26	2,344	11.74
TOTAL	1,010,275	76.96	302,515	23.04

=== Provincial Board ===
Party	Votes	%	Seats
Nacionalista Party	1,283,114	79.18	10
Nationalist People's Coalition	178,477	11.01	1
Aksyon Demokratiko	90,738	5.60	1
Partido Pilipino sa Pagbabago	62,205	3.84	0
Independent politician	6,059	0.37	0
Ex officio seats			3
Total	1,620,593	100.00	15

==== 1st District ====
- Municipalities: Balayan, Calaca, Calatagan, Lemery, Lian, Nasugbu, Taal, Tuy
- Electorate (2019): 378,526

Voters of the district will elect two board members at-large.

Incumbent Roman Rosales Jr. is running for reelection. Another incumbent Board Member Glenda Bausas is not running, instead Armie Bausas is running her in place. Also running are Carlos Alvarez, and Jude Suayan. Ferdinand Rillo withdrew from the race.

2022 Provincial Board Election in 1st District of Batangas
Party	Candidate	Votes	%
Nacionalista	Carlo Roman Rosales	158,633	36.54%
Nacionalista	Armie Bausas	117,348	27.03%
NPC	Carlos Alvarez	95,950	22.10%
PPP	Jude Suayan	62,205	14.33%
Total votes		434,136	100.00%

==== 2nd District ====
- Municipalities: Bauan, Lobo, Mabini, San Luis, San Pascual, Tingloy
- Electorate (2019): 193,151

Voters of the district will elect two board members at-large.

Incumbents Arlina Magboo is running for reelection under Aksyon Demokratiko while Wilson Rivera is running for reelection under Nacionalista Party. Also running are Genaro Abreau and Ramon Lagrana.

2022 Provincial Board Election in 2nd District of Batangas
Party	Candidate	Votes	%
Aksyon	Arlina Magboo	90,738	40.78%
Nacionalista	Wilson Leonardo Rivera	83,412	37.49%
NPC	Ramon Lagrana	45,298	20.36%
Independent	Genaro Abreau	6,059	2.72%
Total votes		222,507	100.00%

==== 3rd District ====
- City: Santo Tomas City, Tanauan City
- Municipalities: Agoncillo, Alitagtag, Balete, Cuenca, Laurel, Malvar, Mataas na Kahoy, San Nicolas, Santa Teresita, Talisay
- Electorate (2019): 430,588

Voters of the district will elect two board members at-large.

Incumbent Rodolfo Balba is running for reelection under Nacionalista Party. While incumbent Jhoanna Corona-Villamor opted to run for Vice Mayor of Tanauan City, instead her father, former Board Member and former Tanauan City Mayor Alfredo Corona, is running. Also running is former Laurel Mayor Randy James Amo. Amo and Corona are running under Nationalist People's Coalition

2022 Provincial Board Election in 3rd District of Batangas
Party	Candidate	Votes	%
NPC	Alfredo Corona	178,477	38.14%
Nacionalista	Rodolfo Balba	162,166	34.65%
NPC	Randy Amo	127,295	27.20%
Total votes		467,938	100.00%

==== 4th District ====
- Municipalities: Ibaan, Padre Garcia, Rosario, San Jose, San Juan, Taysan
- Electorate (2019): 291,063

Voters of the district will elect two board members at-large.

Incumbent Board Members Jesus De Veyra and Jonas Patrick Gozos are both running for reelection under Nacionalista Party. Also vying for a seat is Rodrigo Dotig, but withdrew, as a result both De Veyra and Gozos are running unopposed.

2022 Provincial Board Election in 4th District of Batangas
Party	Candidate	Votes	%
Nacionalista	Jonas Patrick Gozos	154,939	56.06%
Nacionalista	Jesus De Veyra	121,423	43.94%
Total votes		276,362	100.00%

==== 5th District ====
- City: Batangas City
- Electorate (2022): 220,199

Voters of the district will elect two board members at-large.

Incumbent Board Members Maria Claudette Ambida and Arthur Blanco are running for reelection unopposed under Nacionalista Party.

2022 Provincial Board Election in 5th District of Batangas
Party	Candidate	Votes	%
Nacionalista	Maria Claudette Ambida	128,641	50.48%
Nacionalista	Arthur Blanco	126,185	49.52%
Total votes		254,826	100.00%

==== 6th District ====
- City: Lipa City
- Electorate (2022): 222,589

Voters of the district will elect two board members at-large.

Incumbent Board Members Lydio Lopez Jr. and Aries Emmanuel Mendoza are running for reelection under Nacionalista Party. Rodel Lacorte is also running.

2022 Provincial Board Election in 6th District of Batangas
Party	Candidate	Votes	%
Nacionalista	Lydio Lopez, Jr.	126,049	44.71%
Nacionalista	Aries Emmanuel Mendoza	104,318	37.00%
Independent	Rodel Lacorte	51,554	18.28%
Total votes		281,921	100.00%

== Congressional elections ==
=== 1st District ===
Eileen Ermita-Buhain is term-limited. Her husband, former Philippine Sports Commission and Games and Amusement Board Chairman Eric Buhain is her party's nominee. His opponents are his sister-in-law Liza Ermita, Gerry Manalo and Luisito Ruiz. Eduard Rillo withdrew from the congressional race.

2022 Philippine House of Representatives election in Batangas's 1st District
Party	Candidate	Votes	%
Nacionalista	Eric Buhain	143,573	45.28%
NPC	Lisa Ermita	127,421	40.19%
PPP	Gerry Manalo	42,192	13.31%
Ang Kapatiran	Luisito Ruiz	3,839	1.21%
Total votes		317,025	100.00%
Nacionalista hold			

=== 2nd District ===
Incumbent Raneo Abu is term limited. His daughter, Reina Abu is his party's nominee. Her opponents are former Presidential Anti-graft Commission Commissioner Nicasio Conti and Jinky Luistro, Municipal Administrator of Mabini and wife of incumbent Mabini Mayor Noel Luistro.

2022 Philippine House of Representatives election in Batangas's 2nd District
Party	Candidate	Votes	%
NPC	Gerville Luistro	71,832	43.21%
Nacionalista	Maria Reina Abu	68,208	41.03%
PDP–Laban	Nicasio Conti	26,193	15.76%
Total votes		166,233	100.00%
NPC gain from Nacionalista			

=== 3rd District ===
Incumbent Ma. Theresa "Maitet" Collantes is running for her third and final term. Her opponents are Nestor Burgos and incumbent Talisay Mayor Gerry Natanauan. Irich John Bolinas was substituted by incumbent Tanauan City Mayor Mary Angeline Halili.

2022 Philippine House of Representatives election in Batangas's 3rd District
Party	Candidate	Votes	%
NPC	Ma. Theresa Collantes	224,371	60.94%
PDDS	Mary Angeline Halili	106,785	29.00%
Independent	Gerry Natanauan	31,074	8.44%
Independent	Nestor Burgos	5,968	1.62%
Total votes		368,198	100.00%
NPC hold			

=== 4th District ===
Incumbent Lianda Bolilia is running for her third and final term. Her opponent is former Taysan Mayor Victor Portugal, Jr. This will serve as a rematch of the 2016 congressional elections for both Bolilia and Portugal.

2022 Philippine House of Representatives election in Batangas's 4th District
Party	Candidate	Votes	%
Nacionalista	Lianda Bolilia	184,163	73.06%
NPC	Victor Portugal, Jr.	67,915	26.94%
Total votes		252,078	100.00%
Nacionalista hold			

=== 5th District (Batangas City) ===
Incumbent Marvey Mariño is running for his third and final term. His opponent is Calito Bisa.

2022 Philippine House of Representatives election in Batangas's 5th District
Party	Candidate	Votes	%
Nacionalista	Marvey Mariño	156,530	91.98%
Ang Kapatiran	Carlito Bisa	13,645	8.02%
Total votes		170,175	100.00
Nacionalista hold			

=== 6th District (Lipa City) ===
Incumbent Vilma Santos-Recto, who was initially planning to run for a higher office, is retiring from politics. Her husband, incumbent Senator Ralph Recto is her party's nominee and is running unopposed.

2022 Philippine House of Representatives election in Batangas's 6th District
Party	Candidate	Votes	%
Nacionalista	Ralph Recto	161,540	100.00%
Total votes		161,540	100.00%
Nacionalista hold			

== City and municipal elections ==
All municipalities of Batangas, Batangas City, Lipa City, Santo Tomas City and Tanauan City will elect mayor and vice-mayor this election. The candidates for mayor and vice mayor with the highest number of votes wins the seat; they are voted separately, therefore, they may be of different parties when elected. Below is the list of mayoralty and vice-mayoralty candidates of each city and municipalities per district.

=== 1st District ===
- Municipality: Balayan, Calaca, Calatagan, Lemery, Lian, Nasugbu, Taal, Tuy

==== Balayan ====
Emmanuel Fronda II is the incumbent.

Balayan mayoralty elections
Party	Candidate	Votes	%
Nacionalista	Emmanuel Salvador Fronda II	41,439	88.65%
Liberal	Pablo Lopez	5,306	11.35%
Invalid or blank votes			
Total votes			
Nacionalista hold			

Incumbent Francisco Ramos is running for reelection.

Balayan vice mayoralty elections
Party	Candidate	Votes	%
Nacionalista	Efren Chavez	26,225	55.05%
Liberal	Francisco Ramos	21,417	44.95%
Invalid or blank votes			
Total votes			
Nacionalista gain from Liberal			

2022 Balayan Municipal Council Elections
Party	Candidate	Votes	%
Nacionalista	Raquel Aniwasal		
Nacionalista	Raymund Nonnatus de la Vega		
Nacionalista	John Albert Mapalad		
Nacionalista	Vitaliano Santos Jr.		
NPC	Alfredo Solis III		
Nacionalista	Demetrio Hernandez		
Nacionalista	Bernardo Pantoja		
Nacionalista	Elmer del Carmen		
Nacionalista	Benjamin Garcia-Ascue X		
Independent	Marlon Martinez		
Independent	Rita Abiad		
Liberal	Lorelyn Pamintuan-Caraig		
NPC	Christeta Caraig-Esperon		
Independent	Gaudioso de Lunas		
Independent	Donato Abiog		
Total votes			

==== Calaca ====
Incumbent Sofronio Ona is running for reelection. His opponents are Roberto Landicho and incumbent vice mayor Renante Macalindong.

Calaca mayoralty elections
Party	Candidate	Votes	%
Nacionalista	Sofronio Ona	31,285	59.33%
PPP	Renante Macalindong	21,305	40.40%
PROMDI	Roberto Landicho	139	0.26%
Invalid or blank votes			
Total votes			
Nacionalista hold			

Incumbent Renante Macalindong is term-limited and is running for mayor. His party nominated Melvin Malabanan. His opponents are Jerry Raphael Katigbak and Antonio Mendoza.

Calaca vice mayoralty elections
Party	Candidate	Votes	%
Nacionalista	Jerry Raphael Katigbak	32,926	65.86%
PPP	Melvin Malabanan	16,308	32.62%
PROMDI	Antonio Mendoza	757	1.51%
Invalid or blank votes			
Total votes			
Nacionalista gain from PPP			

2022 Calaca Municipal Council Elections
Party	Candidate	Votes	%
Nacionalista	Deovic Ontangco		
Nacionalista	Robenson Sale		
Nacionalista	Prima Dajoyag		
Nacionalista	Michael Jones Salazar		
Nacionalista	Rexner Jown Pastoral		
Nacionalista	Divina Opelanio		
Nacionalista	Caesar Ryan Noche		
PPP	Cedric de Joya		
PPP	Luis Macalalad		
Nacionalista	Nestor Panaligan		
PPP	Gregorio Andal		
PPP	Gavino Manalo		
PPP	Lilibeth Mediavillo		
PPP	Dante Patulot		
PROMDI	Anjon Casanova		
PROMDI	Adolfo Cabrera		
Independent	Adolfo Rey		
PROMDI	Federico Pastoral		
Independent	Bayani Alamag		
PROMDI	Glenda Vanessa Atienza-dela Cruz		
PROMDI	Ricardo Jumarang		
PROMDI	Glenda Atienza		
PROMDI	Julian Renante Matira		
PROMDI	Mario Muñoz		
PROMDI	Gerardo Villamar		
Total votes			

==== Calatagan ====
Incumbent Peter Oliver Palacio is running for reelection. His opponent is former Vice Mayor Lenie Pantoja.

Calatagan mayoralty elections
Party	Candidate	Votes	%
NPC	Peter Oliver Palacio	17,025	59.77%
Aksyon	Lenie Pantoja	11,459	40.23%
Invalid or blank votes			
Total votes			
NPC hold			

Incumbent Rogelio Zarraga is running for reelection. His opponent is Rexio Bautista.

Calatagan vice mayoralty elections
Party	Candidate	Votes	%
NPC	Rogelio Zarraga	15,377	55.69%
Independent	Rexio Bautista	12,235	44.31%
Invalid or blank votes			
Total votes			
NPC hold			

2022 Calatagan Municipal Council Elections
Party	Candidate	Votes	%
NPC	Theresa Palacio-Pelea		
NPC	Florentino Cahayon		
Aksyon	Teodulo Jose Caisip		
NPC	Ramon Ancheta		
NPC	Virgilio Eleponga Jr.		
NPC	Danilo Pineda		
Independent	Ruben Bautista		
NPC	Anthony Sayo		
Independent	Franklin Quintia		
NPC	Felix Ligan		
NPC	Ernesto Verroya		
Independent	Danilo Quidem		
Independent	Efren Ednaco		
Independent	Amiel Anne Anzaldo-Caraig		
Independent	Gerardo Daluz		
Independent	Domingo Zapata		
Independent	Raymon Anzaldo		
Independent	Sophia Grandeza-Patiño		
Independent	Gilbert Basco		
Aksyon	Alberto Cueto		
Independent	Darwin Concepcion		
Total votes			

==== Lemery ====
Incumbent Geraldine Ornales who assumed office upon the death of Mayor Eulalio Alilio is running for Vice Mayor. Running for the position are Ian Kenneth Alilio, son of former Mayor Alilio who substituted him in the mayoralty race and Nene Bendaña, wife of former mayor Raul Bendaña.

Lemery mayoralty elections
Party	Candidate	Votes	%
Nacionalista	Ian Kenneth Alilio	24,851	52.62%
NPC	Evelyn Bendaña	22,372	47.38%
Invalid or blank votes			
Total votes			
Nacionalista gain from Independent			

Running for the position is incumbent Mayor Geraldine Ornales who is running unopposed.

Lemery Vice Mayoralty Election
Party	Candidate	Votes	%
Independent	Geraldine Ornales	30,651	100%
Invalid or blank votes			
Total votes			
Independent gain from Nacionalista			

Incumbent Maria Hanalee Bustos who assumed office upon the death of Mayor Eulalio Alilio is running for councilor.

2022 Lemery Municipal Council Elections
Party	Candidate	Votes	%
Nacionalista	Maria Hanalee Bustos		
Nacionalista	Hannah Beatriz Cabral		
Nacionalista	Aris Kenneth Punzalan		
Nacionalista	Christopher Jones Bello		
Nacionalista	Rosendo Eguia		
NPC	Rodolfo de Castro Jr.		
Nacionalista	Napoleon Piol		
UNIDO	Susan Vidal		
Nacionalista	Bienvenido Villanueva		
NPC	Maria Lourdes Vergara-Cabanding		
NPC	Michael Perez		
NPC	Alvin Marasigan		
NPC	Rosemarie Valle		
NPC	Armyr Encarnacion		
NPC	Cenon Banaag		
Independent	Edward Umali		
Independent	Louie Rosales		
Independent	Eduardo Encarnacion		
Independent	Jerwin Detera		
Total votes			

==== Lian ====
Incumbent Joseph Peji who assumed office after the death of former Mayor Isagani Bolompo is running for his first full three-year term. His opponents are Iniño Bolompo, son of former Mayor Isagani Bolompo and Vice Mayor Leo Malinay.

Lian mayoralty elections
Party	Candidate	Votes	%
PPP	Joseph Peji	13,140	43.12%
PDP–Laban	Iniño Bolompo	8,799	28.87%
NPC	Leo Malinay	8,536	28.01%
Invalid or blank votes			
Total votes			
PPP hold			

Incumbent Leo Malinay who assumed office after the death of former Mayor Isagani Bolompo is running for mayor. His party nominated Jillian Decilos. His opponents are Jimmy Delos Reyes and Ronin Leviste, son of incumbent Vice Governor Mark Leviste.

Lian vice mayoralty elections
Party	Candidate	Votes	%
Independent	Ronin Leviste	12,635	43.34%
PPP	Jimmy Delos Santos	9,856	33.81%
NPC	Jillian Decilos	6,663	22.85%
Invalid or blank votes			
Total votes			
Independent gain from NPC			

2022 Lian Municipal Council Elections
Party	Candidate	Votes	%
PPP	Cesar Lagus Jr.		
PPP	Benito Magbago		
PPP	Leopoldo Jonson		
NPC	Osita Vergara		
PPP	Arlene Lagus		
NPC	Roland Magyaya		
NPC	Lauro Butiong		
PPP	Reynaldo Herrera Jr.		
NPC	Tomas Delos Reyes		
NPC	Eliseo Maranan		
PPP	Denison Magahis		
PPP	Ireneo Cabahog		
PPP	Maria April Mercado		
PDP–Laban	Lolita de Jesus		
NPC	Michael Comaya		
PRP	Larry Alberto		
NPC	Nelia Magana-Manuel		
NPC	Sixto Aninao		
PFP	Eric Lapitan		
Total votes			

==== Nasugbu ====
Incumbent Antonio Jose Barcelon is running for reelection. His opponents are incumbent Vice Mayor Larry Albanio and Roderick Cabral

Nasugbu mayoralty elections
Party	Candidate	Votes	%
Independent	Antonio Jose Barcelon	32,610	48.06%
NPC	Roderick Cabral	20,329	29.96%
PDP–Laban	Larry Albanio	14,917	21.98%
Invalid or blank votes			
Total votes			
Independent hold			

Incumbent Larry Albanio is term-limited and is running for Mayor. His party nominated Melvin Salanguit. His opponents are Arlene Chuidian and incumbent councilor Mildred Sanchez.

Nasugbu vice mayoralty elections
Party	Candidate	Votes	%
Nacionalista	Mildred Sanchez	31,081	49.43%
NPC	Arlene Chuidian	24,685	39.25%
PDP–Laban	Melvin Salanguit	7,119	11.32%
Invalid or blank votes			
Total votes			
Nacionalista gain from PDP–Laban			

2022 Nasugbu Municipal Council Elections
Party	Candidate	Votes	%
Independent	Jehiel Barcelon		
PDP–Laban	Dennis Apacible		
PDP–Laban	Arvin Ordiales		
Independent	Apolo Villafania		
Independent	Wilfredo Limboc		
NPC	Marcos Guevarra		
Independent	Frederick Silang		
NPC	Jose Mari Bautista		
Independent	Perlita Rufo		
PDP–Laban	Abundio Limboc		
PDP–Laban	King Gumba		
Independent	Marichu Zabarte		
PDP–Laban	Jingle Busilig-Consumo		
Independent	Juner Villarin		
PDP–Laban	Rommel Riñoza		
NPC	Oscar Caraig		
PDP–Laban	Eduardo Bausas		
Independent	Reynaldo Legaspi		
NPC	Aquilino Mendoza		
Lakas	Roland Salanguit		
NPC	Leodigario Consigo		
PDP–Laban	Marco Polo Liwanag		
Independent	Artemio Delos Reyes		
Independent	Edgar Francisco		
Independent	Albert Rolle		
Total votes			

==== Taal ====
Incumbent Fulgencio Mercado is running for reelection. His opponent is Romeo Baleros.

Taal mayoralty elections
Party	Candidate	Votes	%
Nacionalista	Fulgencio Mercado	19,623	61.39%
PRP	Romeo Baleros	12,340	38.61%
Invalid or blank votes			
Total votes			
Nacionalista hold			

Incumbent Jovit Albufera is running for reelection.

Taal vice mayoralty elections
Party	Candidate	Votes	%
NPC	Michael Rey Villano	18,185	57.54%
Nacionalista	Jovit Albufera	13,421	42.46%
Invalid or blank votes			
Total votes			
NPC gain from Nacionalista			

2022 Taal Municipal Council Elections
Party	Candidate	Votes	%
Nacionalista	Arnulfo Garces		
Independent	Warren Alcaraz		
Nacionalista	Maria Adelaida Baleros		
Nacionalista	Marizen Bello-Mercado		
PRP	Jefferson Tamayo		
Nacionalista	Erwin Lascano		
Nacionalista	Erwin Reyes Jr.		
Nacionalista	Juanito Legaspi Jr.		
PRP	Rolando Correa Jr.		
Nacionalista	Juliet Villar		
Nacionalista	Ricky Villanueva		
PRP	Alejandro Montenegro Jr.		
PRP	Rogelio Marcellana		
Independent	Emerson Reyes		
PRP	Christian Sajona		
PRP	Frederick Bonsol		
Independent	Arturo Razon		
PRP	Wilson Tenorio		
Independent	Cecilio Reyes		
PRP	Christopher MC Ryan Aguila		
Independent	Dennis Atienza		
Independent	Cristina Navarrete		
Total votes			

==== Tuy ====
Incumbent Armando Afable is running for Vice Mayor, switching places with Incumbent Vice Mayor Jose Jecerrel Cerrado. His opponent is former Mayor Edgardo Calingasan.

Tuy mayoralty elections
Party	Candidate	Votes	%
Nacionalista	Jose Jecerrel Cerrado	19,455	80.21%
NPC	Edgardo Calingasan	4,799	19.79%
Invalid or blank votes			
Total votes			
Nacionalista hold			

Incumbent Jose Jecerrel Cerrado is running for Mayor, switching places with incumbent mayor Armando Afable. His opponent is Richman Rodriguez.

Tuy vice mayoralty elections
Party	Candidate	Votes	%
Nacionalista	Armando Afable	14,681	61.90%
NPC	Richman Rodriguez	9,037	38.10%
Invalid or blank votes			
Total votes			
Nacionalista hold			

2022 Tuy Municipal Council Elections
Party	Candidate	Votes	%
Nacionalista	Michael Perez		
Nacionalista	Rafael Bautista		
Nacionalista	Randoll Catapang		
Nacionalista	Reymundo Rodriguez		
Nacionalista	Aniceto Abiad		
Nacionalista	Felisa Rivera		
Nacionalista	Eduardo Afable Jr.		
Nacionalista	Adrian Perez		
NPC	Jerome Patulot		
NPC	Emmanuel Calingasan		
NPC	Lilio Cabingan		
NPC	Maximino Hernandez		
NPC	Juliana Capacia-Fabonan		
NPC	Eliseo Garces		

=== 2nd District ===
- Municipality: Bauan, Lobo, Mabini, San Luis, San Pascual, Tingloy

==== Bauan ====
Incumbent Rhyan Dolor is running for reelection.

Bauan mayoralty elections
Party	Candidate	Votes	%
Nacionalista	Rhyan Dolor	37,869	76.80%
NPC	Juan Magboo	11,437	23.20%
Invalid or blank votes			
Total votes			
Nacionalista hold			

Incumbent Julian Casapao is running for reelection.

Bauan vice mayoralty elections
Party	Candidate	Votes	%
NUP	Ronald Cruzat	17,589	35.88%
Nacionalista	Julian Casapao	17,545	35.79%
NPC	Jose Roseller Castillo	13,447	27.43%
Independent	Alejandro Hernandez	435	0.89%
Invalid or blank votes			
Total votes			
NUP gain from Nacionalista			

2022 Bauan Municipal Council Elections
Party	Candidate	Votes	%
Nacionalista	Herminio Dolor		
Nacionalista	Neil Valdez		
Nacionalista	Romel Basilan		
Nacionalista	Jennelle Claresta Guenn Abante		
NPC	Patricia Nicole Abrahan		
Nacionalista	Michael Endaya		
Nacionalista	Josephine Gimeno		
Nacionalista	Leon Ramos Jr.		
Aksyon	Ren Shuster Maramot		
Nacionalista	Mely Castillo		
Independent	Victor Bejer		
NPC	Sanimar Acuzar		
NPC	Dennis Panopio		
NPC	Victor Barredo		
NPC	Christine Briones		
Independent	Timoteo Abu		
NPC	Ronaldo Ilagan		
NPC	Christian Icatlo		
PDP–Laban	Raulito Abrahan		
NPC	Virgilio Dacutan		
Independent	Francisco Maranan		

==== Lobo ====
Incumbent Gaudioso Manalo is term-limited and is running for Vice Mayor. His wife, Lota is his party's nominee. Her opponents are incumbent councilor Dean Albert Araja and former mayor Efren Diona.

Lobo mayoralty elections
Party	Candidate	Votes	%
Nacionalista	Lota Manalo	12,332	52.10%
NPC	Dean Albert Araja	6,145	25.96%
PDP–Laban	Efren Diona	5,191	21.93%
Invalid or blank votes			
Total votes			
Nacionalista hold			

Incumbent Virgilio Manalo is not running. His brother, incumbent mayor Gaudioso Manalo is his party's nominee. His opponents are incumbent councilor Nilo Camo and former vice mayor Renato Perez.

Lobo vice mayoralty elections
Party	Candidate	Votes	%
Nacionalista	Gaudioso Manalo	11,399	50.02%
PDP–Laban	Renato Perez	6,214	27.27%
NPC	Nilo Camo	5,177	22.72%
Invalid or blank votes			
Total votes			
Nacionalista hold			

2022 Lobo Municipal Council Elections
Party	Candidate	Votes	%
PDP–Laban	Geronimo Alfiler	10,049	
PROMDI	Angelito Abiera	9,325	
Nacionalista	Michael Cueto	8,404	
PDP–Laban	Jan-Michael Anyayahan	7,934	
Independent	Victoriano Dueñas	7,780	
NPC	Mark Ernani Tiu	7,597	
PDP–Laban	Amador Ambrocio Sulit	7,446	
NPC	Leslee Aguilar	7,064	
Nacionalista	Mikael Andaya II	6,959	
Nacionalista	Ridian Dueñas	6,958	
Nacionalista	Henry Dimaano	6,862	
Nacionalista	Carlos Magtibay	5,720	
Nacionalista	Roberto Cuadro	5,672	
PDP–Laban	Marilyn Marquez	5,608	
Nacionalista	Mafriel Dimaano	5,517	
Independent	Bienvenido Aliwalas Jr.	5,358	
Nacionalista	Jake Paglicawan	4,729	
Aksyon	Marissa Ilagan	3,892	
NPC	Reynato Ramirez	3,826	
NPC	Winny Acuzar	3,483	
PDP–Laban	Jesus Borbon	2,975	
PDP–Laban	Severa Morales	2,433	
NPC	Alex Bukas Jr.	2,248	
NPC	Paulito Driz	1,516	

==== Mabini ====
Incumbent Noel Luistro is running for reelection. His opponents are Joel Abarintos and former mayor Nilo Villanueva.

Mabini mayoralty elections
Party	Candidate	Votes	%
Aksyon	Nilo Villanueva	14,470	53.54%
NPC	Noel "Bitrics" Luistro	12,505	46.27%
Independent	Joel Abarintos	49	0.18%
Invalid or blank votes			
Total votes			
Aksyon gain from NPC			

Mabini vice mayoralty elections
Party	Candidate	Votes	%
NUP	Leonido Bantugon	12,680	49.95%
NPC	Pablo Villanueva, Jr.	10,793	42.52%
Independent	Luis Cesar Beloso	1,010	3.98%
Independent	Oscar Calangi	902	3.55%
Invalid or blank votes			
Total votes			
NUP gain from NPC			

2022 Mabini Municipal Council Elections
Party	Candidate	Votes	%
NPC	Victorino Bueno Jr.		
NPC	Roland Richard Dieza		
NPC	Marysweet Magnaye		
NPC	Catalino Arago		
NUP	Jerkyll Sandoval		
NPC	Sonny de Leon		
NPC	Jose Nelson Hernandez		
Aksyon	Mark Franklin Castillo		
NPC	Marcelo Castillo		
NPC	Felix Ligan		
NPC	Alex Kenny Fabila		
Aksyon	Rusvin Maramot		
NUP	Jane Abarintos-Maramot		
NUP	Kristian Adam Balasa		
PDP–Laban	Francisca Nancy Homoroc		
Independent	Virgilio Panopio		
NUP	Julsie Schmid		
NUP	Efren Calangi Jr.		
Independent	Rizaldy Luistro Jr.		
Independent	Rubyjane Villanueva		
Independent	Melandro Castillo		
Independent	Meynardo Castillo		
Total votes			

==== San Luis ====
Incumbent Danilo Medina, who won as Vice Mayor in 2019 assumed as Mayor when reelected mayor Samuel Noel Ocampo died before taking his oath of office is running for his first full three-year term. His opponents are Lely Beth Vale, mother of Sangguniang Kabataan Provincial Federation President Mary Louise Vale, incumbent Vice Mayor Oscarlito Hernandez and former Mayor Rodolfo Mendoza.

San Luis mayoralty elections
Party	Candidate	Votes	%
PFP	Oscarlito Hernandez	8,085	37.56%
Nacionalista	Danilo Medina	4,949	22.99%
Aksyon	Lely Beth Vale	4,378	20.34%
Reporma	Rodolfo Mendoza	4,114	19.11%
Invalid or blank votes			
Total votes			
PFP gain from Nacionalista			

Incumbent Oscarlito Hernandez, who won as first Municipal Councilor in 2019 assumed as Vice Mayor when reelected mayor Samuel Noel Ocampo died before taking his oath of office is running for mayor. His party nominated Danilo Lasala.

San Luis vice mayoralty elections
Party	Candidate	Votes	%
Aksyon	Ma-an De Gracia	6,709	31.72%
Reporma	Benjamin De Castro	6,437	30.43%
PFP	Danilo Lasala	3,597	17.01%
Independent	Solan Cuasay	2,635	12.46%
Nacionalista	Armingol De Gracia	1,774	8.39%
Invalid or blank votes			
Total votes			
Aksyon gain from PFP			

2022 San Luis Municipal Council Elections
Party	Candidate	Votes	%
UNA	Aisa Maritha Ocampo		
PFP	Rolan de Villa		
Reporma	Marjorie de Castro		
Independent	Edgardo Pagkaliwagan		
PFP	Amabelle Mangubat-Williams		
PFP	Rolando Reyes		
Reporma	Reynato Patolot		
PFP	Eleazar Cinco		
Reporma	Michael Brett Cornejo		
PFP	Adelio Bonsol		
Nacionalista	Leonardo Gumapac		
PFP	Othello Matro Jr.		
Reporma	Airon Onda		
Nacionalista	Katrina Angela Atienza		
Independent	John Paul de Villa		
PFP	Junar Cabrera		
Aksyon	Danny Mendoza		
Reporma	Marinela Magsombol		
Nacionalista	Jaime Anoyo		
Independent	Rodolfo Jose Boseta		
Reporma	Guiaria Cuasay		
Nacionalista	Alain Beig		
PFP	Bernadette Atienza		
PFP	Roberto Cuasay		
Nacionalista	Francisco Malabanan		
Nacionalista	Merilyn Perez		
Independent	Amiel Badillo		
Reporma	Enrique Marasigan		
Aksyon	Marlyn de Villa		
Aksyon	Rex Lenuel de Claro		
Reporma	Batilde Agnes Cilindro		
Aksyon	Lito Marco		
Aksyon	Maria Madel Isnit		
Aksyon	Limneo Dimalasan		
Nacionalista	Roy Bonsol		
Aksyon	Albert Regala		
Aksyon	Earl Angelo Carandang		
Nacionalista	Cristeta Padua		
Independent	Noli Jolloso		
Total votes			

==== San Pascual ====
Incumbent Antonio Dimayuga is running for reelection. His opponent is former mayor Rosario Anna Victoria "Roanna" Conti.

San Pascual mayoralty elections
Party	Candidate	Votes	%
UNA	Antonio Dimayuga	19,329	55.52%
PDP–Laban	Rosario Anna Victoria Conti	15,485	44.48%
Invalid or blank votes			
Total votes			
UNA hold			

Incumbent Isagani Dimatatac is running for reelection. His opponent is former municipal councilor Angelina "Lynn" Castillo.

San Pascual vice mayoralty elections
Party	Candidate	Votes	%
PDP–Laban	Angelina "Lynn" Castillo	19,077	56.00%
UNA	Isagani Dimatatac	14,991	44.00%
Invalid or blank votes			
Total votes			
PDP–Laban gain from UNA			

2022 San Pascual Municipal Council Elections
Party	Candidate	Votes	%
UNA	Roumel Aguila		
PDP–Laban	Jaime Collantes		
UNA	Lanifel Manalo		
UNA	Dennis Panopio		
UNA	Crispina Caraan		
PDP–Laban	Hazzel Bulanhagui		
UNA	Juanito Chavez		
Independent	Rowena Manalo		
UNA	Ramel Fernandez		
UNA	Efren Reyes		
Independent	Jessie Jusi		
PDP–Laban	Parnel Conti		
Independent	Celso Abrugena		
PDP–Laban	Joey Marie Mauhay		
PDP–Laban	Oliver Manalo		
PDP–Laban	Rodney Cantos		
UNA	Ruben Gonzalbo		
PDP–Laban	Mauricio Caraan		
PDP–Laban	Jucylita Garcia		
Total votes			

==== Tingloy ====
Incumbent Lauro Alvarez is running for reelection.

Tingloy mayoralty elections
Party	Candidate	Votes	%
Nacionalista	Lauro Alvarez	5,549	57.72%
PDP–Laban	Victoria Nubla	4,064	42.28%
Invalid or blank votes			
Total votes			
Nacionalista hold			

Incumbent Rolando Masangkay is running for reelection.

Tingloy vice mayoralty elections
Party	Candidate	Votes	%
Nacionalista	Dawn Erika Alvarez	5,413	56.60%
PDP–Laban	Rolando Masangkay	4,150	43.40%
Invalid or blank votes			
Total votes			
Nacionalista gain from PDP–Laban			

2022 Tingloy Municipal Council Elections
Party	Candidate	Votes	%
Nacionalista	Romeo Macarandang		
Nacionalista	Danilo Datingaling		
Independent	Marinel de Chavez		
Nacionalista	Tessa Marie de Torres		
NPC	Raymundo Atienza		
Independent	Rick Jayson Prepose		
Nacionalista	Camelo de Ade		
Nacionalista	Andres Manalo		
Nacionalista	Virgilio Manalo		
PDP–Laban	Ryan Navarro		
PDP–Laban	Leonardo de Claro		
PDP–Laban	Alexander Magsino		
Nacionalista	Eligio Dumaoal		
Independent	Virgilio Candava		
Nacionalista	Haideecel Atienza		
PDP–Laban	Venus Dacayanan		
Nacionalista	Lauro Manalo		
PDP–Laban	Maria Rosalyn Datingaling		
PDP–Laban	Adoracion Atienza		
Independent	Hilario Binay		
PDP–Laban	Juancho Sison		
PDP–Laban	Alfredo Panopio		
Total votes			

=== 3rd District ===
- Cities: Santo Tomas City, Tanauan City
- Municipality: Agoncillo, Alitagtag, Balete, Cuenca, Laurel, Malvar, Mataas na Kahoy, San Nicolas, Santa Teresita, Talisay

==== Santo Tomas City ====
Incumbent Edna Sanchez is term-limited. Her party's nominee is incumbent Vice Mayor Armenius Silva.

Santo Tomas City mayoralty elections
Party	Candidate	Votes	%
Aksyon	Arth Jhun Marasigan	46,566	50.24%
Nacionalista	Armenius Silva	21,622	23.33%
PFP	Banjoe Manzanilla	14,425	15.56%
PRP	Timmy Almeda	9,411	10.15%
PPP	Dingdong Meer	455	0.49%
Independent	Severino Harina	204	0.22%
Invalid or blank votes			
Total votes			
Aksyon gain from Nacionalista			

Incumbent Armenius Silva is running for mayor.

Santo Tomas City vice mayoralty elections
Party	Candidate	Votes	%
Aksyon	Cathy Jaurigue-Perez	50,606	57.64%
Nacionalista	Renante Arcillas	19,246	21.92%
PFP	Noel Ascaño	17,949	20.44%
Invalid or blank votes			
Total votes			
Aksyon gain from Nacionalista			

2022 Santo Tomas City Council Elections
Party	Candidate	Votes	%
UNA	Ross Allan Maligaya		
Aksyon	Leovino Villegas		
Aksyon	Raquel Maloles		
UNA	Danilo Mabilangan		
NPC	Arlene Fedrico-Mañebo		
PFP	Arturo Pecaña		
NPC	Gerardo Malijan		
NPC	Helengrace Navarro		
PRP	Victor Bathan		
Nacionalista	Adrian Carpio		
PRP	Jonathan Pecaña		
Nacionalista	Peter Thomas Reyes		
NPC	Donna Marie Sanchez		
Nacionalista	Harold Glenn Nora		
PRP	Mico Renzo Bathan		
PRP	Adrian Sanchez		
Nacionalista	Maureen Dimayuga		
Independent	Edwin Ascaño		
PFP	Fermin Solis		
PFP	Eric Gonzales		
Nacionalista	Mark Loven Libiut		
PRP	Jay Oloc-Oloc		
Nacionalista	Ermina Centeno		
Nacionalista	Kim Ryan Balitaan		
Nacionalista	Reginald Michael Manito		
Nacionalista	Danilo de Mesa		
Nacionalista	Hernando Navarez		
PRP	Romulo Latayan		
PRP	Renato Mangaban		
Independent	Ryan Molina		
PRP	Rey Meer		
Independent	Alejandro Sanchez		
Independent	Rosalina Mabilangan		
Independent	Jay-Ar Valderama		
Total votes			

==== Tanauan City ====
Incumbent Mary Angeline Halili is running for congresswoman. Her brother, Mark Anthony Halili is her party's nominee. His opponent is former Batangas 3rd district Representative Sonny Collantes.

Tanauan City mayoralty elections
Party	Candidate	Votes	%
NPC	Sonny Collantes	61,391	49.73%
PDDS	Mark Anthony Halili	55,266	44.77%
Valid ballots		123,429	91.49%
Invalid or blank votes		11,476	8.51%
Total votes		134,905	100.00%
NPC gain from PDDS			

Incumbent Herminigildo Trinidad, Jr. is running for reelection. His opponent is incumbent board member Jhoanna Corona-Villamor.

Tanauan City vice mayoralty elections
Party	Candidate	Votes	%
PDDS	Herminigildo Trinidad, Jr.	65,459	53.03%
NPC	Jhoanna Corona-Villamor	45,217	36.63%
Valid ballots		123,429	91.49%
Invalid or blank votes		11,476	8.51%
Total votes		134,905	100.00%
PDDS hold			

2022 Tanauan City Council Elections
Party	Candidate	Votes	%
Liberal	Sam Bengzon		
PDDS	Eugene Yson		
PDDS	Glen Win Gonzales		
PDDS	Marissa Tabing		
PDDS	Herman De Sagun		
PDDS	Czylene Marqueses		
NPC	Benedicto Corona		
PDDS	Angel Burgos		
NPC	Kristel Guelos		
NPC	Marcelo Eric Manglo		
Nacionalista	Luis Carlos Mariano Laurel II		
PDDS	Shirley Platon		
NPC	Jun Gocuanco		
PDDS	John Kennedy Macalindong		
NPC	Rexander Quimo		
PDDS	Oliver Oscar Infante		
PDDS	Jay-Ar Manaig		
NPC	Macky Leus Gonzales		
NPC	Ed Quilao		
Independent	Joven Amurao		
NPC	Ambet Sanggalang		
Independent	Rosemarie Ramilo		
Independent	Marcos Valdez		
Independent	Balbino Pariño		
Independent	Alejandro Ramos II		
Independent	Angelito Go		
Total votes			

==== Agoncillo ====
Incumbent Daniel Reyes is term-limited and is running for Vice Mayor. His wife, Cindy Reyes, is his party's nominee. Her opponent is incumbent Vice Mayor Danilo Anuran.

Agoncillo mayoralty elections
Party	Candidate	Votes	%
NPC	Cindy Reyes		
PROMDI	Danilo Anuran		
Invalid or blank votes			
Total votes			
NPC hold			

Incumbent Danilo Anuran is term-limited and is running for mayor.

Agoncillo vice mayoralty elections
Party	Candidate	Votes	%
NPC	Daniel Reyes		
PROMDI	Apolinar Simara		
Invalid or blank votes			
Total votes			
NPC gain from PROMDI			

2022 Agoncillo Municipal Council Elections
Party	Candidate	Votes	%
NPC	Sarah Pauline Mendoza		
NPC	Joel Landicho		
PROMDI	Jerwyn Landicho		
NPC	Clark Eduard Caringal		
NPC	Wilbert Catena		
NPC	Joel de Chavez		
NPC	Virgilio Cacao		
PROMDI	Hermenegildo Lacap III		
PROMDI	Pablita Hernandez		
NPC	Quirino Manalo Jr.		
PROMDI	Alfred Paul John Martinez		
NPC	Simeon Mendoza		
PROMDI	Rodel Irineo de Leon		
PROMDI	Florencio Alcazar		
PROMDI	Joan Alcantara		
PROMDI	Angelito Miranda		
Independent	Renato Agojo		
Total votes			

==== Alitagtag ====
Incumbent Edilberto Ponggos is running for reelection.

Alitagtag mayoralty elections
Party	Candidate	Votes	%
NPC	Edilberto Ponggos	11,032	67.73%
Reporma	Reynaldo Rosales	4,549	27.93%
Independent	Rogelio Ramos	707	4.34%
Invalid or blank votes			
Total votes			
NPC hold			

Alitagtag vice mayoralty elections
Party	Candidate	Votes	%
NPC	Manuel Abrigo	11,376	72.21%
Reporma	Bernardo Reyes	4,376	27.78%
Invalid or blank votes			
Total votes			
NPC gain from Reporma			

2022 Alitagtag Municipal Council Elections
Party	Candidate	Votes	%
NPC	Nathaniel Castillo		
Aksyon	Archie Catapang		
NPC	Frederick Salazar		
Aksyon	Paul Joshua Alcaraz		
NPC	Vladimir Riccardo Macalintal		
NPC	Erwin Dimaculangan		
NPC	Jerome Garcia		
Independent	Ambrosio Sandoval		
NPC	Josepher Atienza		
NPC	Dionisio Gonzales		
NPC	Carina Magundayao		
Reporma	Allan Ilagan		
Reporma	Marlon Beloso		
Reporma	Sherwin Quijano		
Reporma	Andres Delgado		
Reporma	Paolo Manalo		
Independent	Ricky Aguila		
Reporma	Vivian Gamboa		
Independent	Ralph Gonzales		
Total votes			

==== Balete ====
Incumbent Wilson Maralit is running for reelection.

Balete mayoralty elections
Party	Candidate	Votes	%
Nacionalista	Wilson Maralit		
PROMDI	Nova Ortega		
Invalid or blank votes			
Total votes			
Nacionalista hold			

Incumbent Alvin Payo is running for reelection.

Balete Vice Mayoralty Election
Party	Candidate	Votes	%
Nacionalista	Alvin Payo		
PROMDI	Armando Maralit		
Invalid or blank votes			
Total votes			
Nacionalista hold			

2022 Balete Municipal Council Elections
Party	Candidate	Votes	%
Nacionalista	Ronald Maralit		
Nacionalista	Raquel Maranan		
Nacionalista	Virgilio del Mundo		
Nacionalista	Ralph Renz Lescano		
Nacionalista	Arlan Garcia		
Nacionalista	Rhyan Tasico		
Nacionalista	Reynaldo Caguitla		
Independent	Roger Serenio		
Nacionalista	Alvin Martinez		
Independent	Jose Ruel de Ocampo		
Independent	Russel Arañez		
PROMDI	Rommel Javier		
PROMDI	Aldwin Valencia		
PROMDI	Myla de Silva		
PROMDI	Marissa Reyes		
PROMDI	Nuel Ortega		
PROMDI	Edwin Magpantay		
PROMDI	Librada Maya		
PROMDI	Victorio Marasigan		
Total votes			

==== Cuenca ====
Faye Endaya is the incumbent. Her opponent is incumbent Vice Mayor Romulo Cuevas.

Cuenca mayoralty elections
Party	Candidate	Votes	%
NPC	Alexander Magpantay		
Nacionalista	Faye Endaya		
Aksyon	Romulo Cuevas		
Invalid or blank votes			
Total votes			
NPC gain from Nacionalista			

Incumbent Romulo Cuevas is running for Mayor. His party nominated Melvin Cuevas.

Cuenca vice mayoralty elections
Party	Candidate	Votes	%
NPC	Aurea Pantas		
Aksyon	Melvin Cuevas		
Nacionalista	Crispin Magsombol		
Invalid or blank votes			
Total votes			
NPC gain from Aksyon			

2022 Cuenca Municipal Council Elections
Party	Candidate	Votes	%
Nacionalista	Niña Neila Verdan		
Nacionalista	Ronnel Pasia		
NPC	Ervin Raymund Remo		
NPC	Angelica Joy Guce		
NPC	Anacleto Javier		
Nacionalista	Danilo Magsombol		
NPC	Henry Larcia		
NPC	Marcelino Malibiran		
Nacionalista	Rolando La Rosa		
Nacionalista	Ian Gorospe		
NPC	Alma Lirio-Castillo		
Nacionalista	Lordlita Hoseña		
NPC	Celestino Lunar		
Nacionalista	Danilo La Rosa		
Aksyon	Apolonio Chavez		
Nacionalista	Celestino Abalayan		
NPC	Francisco Harina		
Aksyon	Lovely Francia Gunay		
Aksyon	Julio Emata		
Aksyon	Gregorio Apuntar		
Aksyon	Grace Lunar-Manalo		
Aksyon	Maria Elizabeth Alday-Ferrer		
Aksyon	Rosario Charity Caraan		
Independent	Rico Devio		
Aksyon	Feliciano Marasigan Jr.		
Total votes			

==== Laurel ====
Incumbent Joan Amo is running for reelection. Her opponent is Lyndon Bruce.

Laurel mayoralty elections
Party	Candidate	Votes	%
PRP	Lyndon Bruce		
NPC	Joan Amo		
Invalid or blank votes			
Total votes			
PRP gain from NPC			

Incumbent Rachelle Ogalinola is running for reelection. Her opponent is former mayoralty candidate Aries Parrilla.

Laurel vice mayoralty elections
Party	Candidate	Votes	%
PRP	Aries Parrilla		
NPC	Rachelle Ogalinola		
Invalid or blank votes			
Total votes			
PRP gain from NPC			

2022 Laurel Municipal Council Elections
Party	Candidate	Votes	%
PRP	Sylvia Austria		
PRP	Angelito Rodriguez		
PRP	Francisco Endozo		
NPC	Iris Joyce Agojo		
Independent	Vincent Endaya		
PRP	Norvic Garcia		
PRP	Leizl de Castro		
NPC	Regina Landicho		
NPC	Junie Ulitin		
PRP	Joemar Maramot		
NPC	Flaviano Pangilinan		
PRP	Manuel Factoriza		
NPC	Cheel Mark Cantero		
NPC	Domingo Tenorio		
NPC	Luciano Gardiola		
NPC	Rosario Turallo		
Independent	Tadeo Dalisay		
Independent	Pedro Umandap Jr.		
Total votes			

==== Malvar ====
Incumbent Cristeta Reyes is running for reelection. Her opponent is her niece, incumbent councilor Carla Reyes, daughter of former mayor Carlito Reyes.

Malvar mayoralty election
Party	Candidate	Votes	%
Nacionalista	Cristeta Reyes		
NPC	Carla Reyes		
Invalid or blank votes			
Total votes			
Nacionalista hold			

Incumbent Matt Louie Aranda is running for councilor. His party nominated former Mayor and Vice Mayor Alberto Lat.

Malvar vice mayoralty election
Party	Candidate	Votes	%
NPC	Alberto Lat		
Invalid or blank votes			
Total votes			
NPC hold			

2022 Malvar Municipal Council Elections
Party	Candidate	Votes	%
NPC	Emiliano Lat		
NPC	Kurt Patrick Abu		
Nacionalista	Karina Reyes		
NPC	Matt Louie Aranda		
Nacionalista	Delia Tagle		
NPC	Ralph Julius Leo Morcilla		
Nacionalista	Edgardo Licarte		
NPC	Jeric Platon		
NPC	Voltaire Kalaw		
Nacionalista	Lemuel Mando		
Independent	Jovito dela Peña		
NPC	Aileen Saludo		
NPC	Arnel Vicente Lantin		
Nacionalista	Gissel Malabanan		
Nacionalista	Federico Basilan		
Nacionalista	Floro Mendoza		
Independent	Christopher Reyes		
Total votes			

==== Mataasnakahoy ====
Incumbent Janet Ilagan is running for reelection.

Mataasnakahoy mayoralty elections
Party	Candidate	Votes	%
NPC	Janet Ilagan		
Aksyon	Randy Tibayan		
Invalid or blank votes			
Total votes			
NPC hold			

Incumbent Jay Ilagan is running for reelection.

Mataasnakahoy vice mayoralty elections
Party	Candidate	Votes	%
NPC	Jay Ilagan		
Aksyon	Lileth Acerimo		
Invalid or blank votes			
Total votes			
NPC hold			

2022 Mataasnakahoy Municipal Council Elections
Party	Candidate	Votes	%
Aksyon	Ferdinand Dimaano		
Aksyon	Karen Joy Laqui		
Independent	Rowell Malabag		
NPC	Herwin del Mundo		
NPC	Lemuel de Ocampo		
NPC	Lourdes Calinisan		
NPC	Pepito Vergara		
NPC	Merlyn Caraan-Laqui		
NPC	Jerry Reyes		
NPC	Angelito Subol		
NPC	Melven Lucero		
Independent	Leander Boyd Obtial		
Independent	Enrique Magpantay		
Aksyon	Antonio Bathan		
Aksyon	Pedro Reyes		
Aksyon	Chester Vergara		
Aksyon	John Kevin Galicia		
PFP	Carmencita Gardiola		
Aksyon	Lemuel Palo		
Aksyon	Jose Eduard Regalado		
Independent	Rowena Cometa		
Total votes			

==== San Nicolas ====
Incumbent Lester De Sagun is running for reelection.

San Nicolas mayoralty elections
Party	Candidate	Votes	%
NPC	Lester De Sagun		
PFP	Helen Sandoval		
Invalid or blank votes			
Total votes			
NPC hold			

Incumbent Napoleon Arceo is running for reelection.

San Nicolas vice mayoralty elections
Party	Candidate	Votes	%
NPC	Nap Arceo		
PFP	Victor Sandoval		
Invalid or blank votes			
Total votes			
NPC hold			

2022 San Nicolas Municipal Council Elections
Party	Candidate	Votes	%
NPC	August Perez		
PFP	Aquilino Harvey Gahol III		
NPC	Agapito Gardiola		
NPC	Alfonso Biscocho		
NPC	Christopher Barrion		
NPC	Marie Kristine Joy Obligar		
NPC	Marivic Malaluan-Ondo		
NPC	Ruelito de Sagun		
NPC	Leo Mortel		
PFP	Lucio Landicho		
PFP	Joseph Landicho		
PFP	Bartolome Banaag		
PFP	Cenon Tenorio		
PFP	Manuelito Balba		
PFP	Joel Nohay		
Total votes			

==== Santa Teresita ====
Incumbent Norberto Segunial is running unopposed.

Santa Teresita mayoralty elections
Party	Candidate	Votes	%
Nacionalista	Norberto Segunial		
Invalid or blank votes			
Total votes			
Nacionalista hold			

Incumbent Ma. Aurea Segunial is running for reelection.

Santa Teresita vice mayoralty elections
Party	Candidate	Votes	%
Nacionalista	Ma. Aurea Segunial		
Invalid or blank votes			
Total votes			
Nacionalista hold			

2022 Santa Teresita Municipal Council Elections
Party	Candidate	Votes	%
Nacionalista	Francia Dagook		
Nacionalista	Marius Ian Sangalang		
Nacionalista	Charlito Arriola		
Nacionalista	Maria Ruth Sandoval		
Nacionalista	Mario Bobadilla		
Nacionalista	Analiza de Chavez		
Nacionalista	Ronilo Atienza		
Nacionalista	Daniel Cataquiz		
Independent	Reynaldo Aquino Jr.		
Independent	Jose Ruel de Ocampo		
PROMDI	Wilson Tingchuy		
Independent	John Lherry Amores		
Independent	Reginaldo Marquinez		
Independent	Rhodalyn Mendoza-Pasion		
Total votes			

==== Talisay ====
Incumbent Gerry Natanauan is term-limited and is running for congressman. His son, incumbent councilor Jerome Natanauan, is running for mayor under Aksyon Demokratiko. His opponents are his uncle, Nestor Natanuan, and the son of former mayor Zenaida Mendoza, Dr. Mark Mendoza.

Talisay mayoralty elections
Party	Candidate	Votes	%
Independent	Nestor Natanauan		
NPC	Mark Mendoza		
Aksyon	Jerome Natanauan		
Invalid or blank votes			
Total votes			
Independent hold			

Incumbent Charlie Natanauan is not seeking any political position, instead his brother Leonardo Natanauan Jr. is running under Aksyon Demokratiko. His opponents are incumbent councilors Francis Magsino and Lorenz Pesigan.

Talisay vice mayoralty elections
Party	Candidate	Votes	%
NPC	Francis "Patet" Magsino		
Lakas	Lorenz Pesigan		
Aksyon	Maliputo Natanauan Jr.		
Invalid or blank votes			
Total votes			
NPC gain from PDP–Laban			

2022 Talisay Municipal Council Elections
Party	Candidate	Votes	%
Independent	Rolly Lamano		
Independent	Henry de Leon		
Independent	Nestor Cabrera		
NPC	Melody Luna		
Lakas	Maria Teresa Panghulan		
Independent	Florencio Mainot		
Aksyon	Edgardo Caraan		
Aksyon	Felix Salazar		
NPC	Arnaldo Luna		
Lakas	Jomin Mathew Centeno		
Aksyon	Maximino Tenorio		
Aksyon	Lope Punzalan		
Aksyon	Mario Lumban		
Aksyon	Rener Cruzat		
Aksyon	Fernando Cacao		
Aksyon	Jefferson Natanauan		
NPC	Edgardo Ordinario		
Independent	Eduardo Pesigan		
Total votes			

=== 4th District ===
- Municipality: Ibaan, Padre Garcia, Rosario, San Jose, San Juan, Taysan

==== Ibaan ====
Edralyn Joy Salvame is running for reelection. Her opponent is former councilor Cesar Marasigan.

Ibaan mayoralty elections
Party	Candidate	Votes	%
PRP	Edralyn Joy Salvame	23,480	67.26%
NPC	Cesar Marasigan	11,430	32.74%
Margin of victory		12,050	34.51%
Valid ballots		34,910	85.68%
Invalid or blank votes		5,826	14.30%
Total votes		40,736	100.00%
PRP hold			

Incumbent Socrates Arellano is running for reelection. His opponent is former councilor and Municipal Administrator Juvy Mendoza. Both Arellano and Mendoza are opponents in the 2019 vice mayoral elections.

Ibaan vice mayoralty elections
Party	Candidate	Votes	%
PRP	Juvy Mendoza	22,182	64.84%
NPC	Socrates Arellano	12,026	35.16%
Margin of victory		10,156	29.68%
Valid ballots		34,208	83.97%
Invalid or blank votes		6,528	16.03%
Total votes		40,736	100.00%
PRP gain from NPC			

2022 Ibaan Municipal Council Elections
Party	Candidate	Votes	%
PRP	Erwin Andal		
NPC	Phil Joshua Caringal		
PRP	Eloise Jan Tejada		
PRP	Arsenio Ricero		
PRP	Paquito Barte		
PRP	Rico Cabatay		
Nacionalista	Sixto "Thosix" Yabyabin		
PRP	Edward De Castro		
PRP	Mateo Guerra		
NPC	Shaila Mella De Castro		
Independent	Eddie Pasia		
NPC	Julius Panaligan		
NPC	Francisco Guerra		
NPC	Victoriano Maputi		
Independent	Pemi Ilao		
Independent	Jayson Magtibay		
Independent	Harold Maralit		
Independent	Cleo Laynes		
Total votes			

==== Padre Garcia ====
Celsa Rivera is running for reelection unopposed.

Padre Garcia mayoralty elections
Party	Candidate	Votes	%
Nacionalista	Celsa Rivera	23,185	100.00%
Valid ballots		23,185	71.73%
Invalid or blank votes		9,134	28.26%
Total votes		32,319	100.00%
Nacionalista hold			

Incumbent Noel Cantos is term-limited. His party nominated former Sangguniang Kabataan Federation President Micko Angelo Rivera, son of incumbent mayor Celsa Rivera and former mayor and 1-CARE party-list representative Michael Angelo Rivera.

Padre Garcia vice mayoralty elections
Party	Candidate	Votes	%
Nacionalista	Micko Angelo Rivera	16,517	61.14%
Independent	Marvin Braceros	10,497	38.86%
Margin of victory		6,020	22.28%
Valid ballots		27,014	83.59%
Invalid or blank votes		5,305	16.41%
Total votes		32,319	100.00%
Nacionalista hold			

2022 Padre Garcia Municipal Council Elections
Party	Candidate	Votes	%
Nacionalista	Melvin Vidal		
Nacionalista	Francisco Bathan		
Nacionalista	Erwin Estole		
Nacionalista	Leandro Linatoc		
Independent	Roy Flores		
Nacionalista	Artemio Gonzales		
Independent	Rico Araño		
Independent	Mona Liza Rivera-Gutierrez		
Nacionalista	Ramil Generoso		
Nacionalista	Cornelio Carpio, Jr.		
Nacionalista	Nilo Dimaculangan		
Independent	Ruben Vidal		
Independent	Shiela Petalio		
Independent	Bernard Joseph Padua		
Independent	Ambet Gutierrez		
Independent	Restituto Recto		
Total votes			

==== Rosario ====
Incumbent Manuel Alvarez is term-limited. His son Joel is his party's nominee. His opponent are incumbent Vice Mayor Leovigildo Morpe, Sonny Roque Parica and former Vice Mayor Jose Valencia.

Rosario mayoralty elections
Party	Candidate	Votes	%
Nacionalista	Leovigildo Morpe	36,418	51.06%
Independent	Joel Alvarez	31,244	43.81%
PROMDI	Jose Valencia	3,565	4.10%
Independent	Sonny Roque Parica	93	0.13%
Margin of victory		5,174	7.25%
Valid ballots		71,320	88.74%
Invalid or blank votes		9,050	11.26%
Total votes		80,370	100.00%
Nacionalista gain from Independent			

Incumbent Leovigildo Morpe is running for mayor. His party nominated incumbent councilor Atanacio Zara. His opponents are incumbent councilors Arnold Austria, Christopher Conti, Aldwin Garcia and former councilor Ferdinand De Veyra.

Rosario vice mayoralty elections
Party	Candidate	Votes	%
Nacionalista	Atanacio Zara	27,701	40.23%
Independent	Arnold Austria	16,975	24.66%
PPP	Aldwin Garcia	16,012	23.26%
PROMDI	Ferdinand De Veyra	4,598	6.68%
KBL	Christopher Conti	3,561	5.17%
Margin of victory		10,726	4.02%
Valid ballots		68,847	85.66%
Invalid or blank votes		11,523	14.34%
Total votes		80,370	100.00
Nacionalista hold			

2022 Rosario Municipal Council Elections
Party	Candidate	Votes	%
Nacionalista	Edward Aguilar		
Nacionalista	Marciano Aquino		
Nacionalista	Albino Altura		
Nacionalista	Joaz De Veyra		
Independent	Angel Alvarez		
Nacionalista	Teodoro Karr Luansing		
Independent	Jose Galicha		
Independent	Darius Aguado		
Nacionalista	Anastacia Torres		
Independent	Catherine Calingasan		
Nacionalista	Dennis Hernandez		
Independent	Marilou Villapando		
Independent	Rodjelo Hernandez		
Independent	Luzviminda Austria		
Independent	Clemencia Maglaqui		
Independent	Melissa Jareño		
Nacionalista	Shirley Ponpon		
PFP	Marian Marquez		
Independent	Apolonia Ilagan		
Independent	Virgilio Pitel		
PROMDI	Dennis Indanan		
PROMDI	Justina Dimaano		
Independent	Ronald Jocson		
PROMDI	Leonardo Anyayahan		
Independent	Pedro Guire		
PROMDI	Bernardo Simbahan		
PROMDI	Rufina Olchondra		
Independent	Jerry Almarez		
PROMDI	Marcelo Reyes		
PROMDI	Jhon Roy Bautista		
Independent	Mario Sanggalang		
Independent	Reynand Cabungcal		
Independent	Nilo Soriano		
PROMDI	Samuel Barral		
Independent	Arnold Omandam		
Total votes			

==== San Jose ====
San Jose mayoralty elections
Party	Candidate	Votes	%
Nacionalista	Valentino Patron		
KBL	Oscar Mendoza		
PFP	Nestor Mercado		
Invalid or blank votes			
Total votes			
Nacionalista hold			

San Jose vice mayoralty elections
Party	Candidate	Votes	%
Aksyon	Noel Virtucio		
Nacionalista	Entiquio Briones		
PFP	Shiela Marie Chavez		
Independent	Arturo De Castro		
Invalid or blank votes			
Total votes			
Aksyon hold			

2022 San Jose Municipal Council Elections
Party	Candidate	Votes	%
Nacionalista	Renji Arcilla		
Nacionalista	Jerick Mercado		
Nacionalista	Joseph Patrick Zara		
Independent	Juvenal Rodriguez		
Nacionalista	Arnold Aguila		
Aksyon	Alex Mendoza		
Aksyon	Armida De Roxas		
Independent	Anabelle Aguila		
Independent	Marife Bathan		
Aksyon	Herminigildo Maquinto		
Nacionalista	Godfrey Umali		
Independent	Lito Andal		
Nacionalista	Pepito Nitro		
Nacionalista	Philip Ona		
Aksyon	Ronald Javiña		
Independent	Renato Addatu		
Independent	Ronald Macaraig		
Independent	Joselito Magpantay		
PFP	Maria Teresa Robles		
Independent	Rosemarie Largo		
Total votes			

==== San Juan ====
Ildebrando Salud is the incumbent and is running unopposed.

San Juan mayoralty elections
Party	Candidate	Votes	%
Independent	Ildebrando Salud	49,349	100.00%
Valid ballots		49,349	68.08%
Invalid or blank votes		23,133	31.92%
Total votes		72,482	100.00%
Independent hold			

Incumbent Octavio Antonio Marasigan is running for reelection. His opponent is incumbent councilor Alvin John Samonte.

San Juan Vice Mayoralty Election
Party	Candidate	Votes	%
Independent	Octavio Antonio Marasigan	35,569	56.88%
Independent	Alvin John Samonte	24,594	39.99
Margin of victory		10,975	18.24%
Valid ballots		60,163	83.00%
Invalid or blank votes		12,319	17.00%
Total votes		72,482	100.00%
Independent hold			

2022 San Juan Municipal Council Elections
Party	Candidate	Votes	%
Independent	Wenilo Ada	42,530	
Independent	Florencio "Poling" De Chavez	39,277	
Independent	Angelo Luis Marasigan	34,643	
Independent	Rowena Magadia	34,568	
Independent	Gerardo Tantay, Jr.	31,626	
Independent	Meynardo Robles	26,147	
Independent	Rodello "Bibingka" De Chavez	26,138	
Independent	Grenalyn "Ineng" Virtusio	25,068	
Nacionalista	Jessie Patron	23,320	
Independent	Erniño "Kid" Llana	23,295	
Independent	Melchor Ayap	22,816	
Independent	Pelita Zaraspe	7,585	
Total votes			

==== Taysan ====
Incumbent Grande Gutierrez is running for reelection. His opponents are former councilors Brigido "Bidong" A. Villena and Ian Portugal.

Taysan mayoralty elections
Party	Candidate	Votes	%
Nacionalista	Grande Gutierrez	13,559	55.14%
PFP	Brigido "Bidong" A. Villena	7,945	32.31%
NPC	Ian Portugal	3,085	12.55%
Margin of victory		5,614	22.83%
Valid ballots		24,589	85.93%
Invalid or blank votes		4,027	14.07%
Total votes		28,616	100.00%
Nacionalista hold			

Incumbent Marianito Perez is running for reelection. His opponent are incumbent councilor Edilberto Adabay and former councilor Clint Bosch.

Taysan vice mayoralty elections
Party	Candidate	Votes	%
Nacionalista	Edilberto Adabay	11,286	47.95%
PFP	Marianito "Nitoy" G. Perez	9,966	42.35%
NPC	Clint Bosch	2,283	9.70%
Margin of victory		1,320	5.61%
Valid ballots		23,535	88.60%
Invalid or blank votes		5,801	11.40%
Total votes		28,616	100.00%
Nacionalista gain from PFP			

2022 Taysan Municipal Council Elections
Party	Candidate	Votes	%
Nacionalista	Luis Favorito		
Nacionalista	Nenita Perez		
Nacionalista	Maria Almirol		
Nacionalista	Francisco Dio		
Nacionalista	Randy Garcia		
Nacionalista	Victoriano Macalalad		
Nacionalista	Danilo Castillo		
Nacionalista	Darwin Cena		
PFP	Rollie "Medallion" Delos Reyes		
NPC	Mark Anthony Arcega		
NPC	Edgardo Arellano		
NPC	Marcelino Comia		
PFP	Sherlyn "She" Peradilla		
PFP	Methuselah "Mitos" Gutierrez		
PFP	Rommel "Omel" Escabel		
NPC	Nelson Macaraig		
PFP	Jefrey "Jef" Arnaiz		
NPC	Dave Batarao		
NPC	Reggie Jienyl Untalan		
Independent	Lorenzo Bisa		
PFP	Richard "DJ Banjo" Ariola		
PFP	Johne "John" Perez		
Independent	Joel Alcantara		
PFP	Roberto "Robert" Mendoza		
NPC	Rolando Florendo		
Independent	Norman Masilang		
NPC	Eladio Cuartero		
Total votes			

=== 5th District ===
- City: Batangas City

==== Batangas City ====
Incumbent Beverley Rose Dimacuha is running for her third and final term. Her opponent is Edu Garcia who is initially running under the Alliance for the Common Good, now under the party Ang Kapatiran.

Batangas City mayoralty elections
Party	Candidate	Votes	%
Nacionalista	Beverley Rose Dimacuha	159,870	91.79%
Ang Kapatiran	Edu Garcia	14,305	8.21%
Margin of victory		145,565	83.57%
Valid ballots		174,175	79.10%
Invalid or blank votes		46,024	20.90%
Total votes		220,199	100.00%
Nacionalista hold			

Incumbent Emilio Francisco Berberabe is term-limited and is running for party-list representative of Buklod Filipino. Running for the position unopposed is incumbent first councilor Alyssa Renee Cruz.

Batangas City Vice Mayoralty Election
Party	Candidate	Votes	%
Nacionalista	Alyssa Renee Cruz	154,656	100.00%
Valid ballots		154,656	70.23%
Invalid or blank votes		65,543	29.77%
Total votes		220,199	100.00%
Nacionalista gain from PDP–Laban			

2022 Batangas City Council Elections
Party	Candidate	Votes	%
Nacionalista	Hamilton Blanco	125,955	
Nacionalista	Karlos Emmanuel Buted	114,758	
Nacionalista	Andrea Faytaren Macaraig	112,781	
Nacionalista	Nestor Dimacuha	107,549	
Nacionalista	Oliver Macatangay	98,918	
Nacionalista	Armando Lazarte	98,623	
Nacionalista	Nelson Chavez	95,858	
Nacionalista	Jonash Tolentino	92,659	
Nacionalista	Zester Carlo Hernandez	91,117	
Nacionalista	Isidra "Ched" Atienza	90,738	
Nacionalista	Lorenzo Gamboa, Jr.	87,425	
Nacionalista	Michael Villena	81,844	
Independent	Bianca "Ian" Villena	55,655	
Independent	Francisco Tegon	36,633	
PPM	Babydoll Berberabe Clemente	33,945	
WPP	Hancel Delos Reyes	18,038	
Independent	Dan-Rey Melo Reyes	16,023	
Total votes			

=== 6th District ===
- City: Lipa City

==== Lipa City ====
Incumbent Eric Africa is running for reelection. His opponents are former Mayor Meynardo Sabili and former Batangas Provincial Police Director Nestor Sanares.

Lipa City mayoralty elections
Party	Candidate	Votes	%
Nacionalista	Eric Africa	138,674	73.10%
Pwersa ng Masang Pilipino	Meynardo Sabili	45,000	23.72%
Reporma	Nestor Sanares	6,018	3.17%
Margin of victory		93,674	49.38%
Valid ballots		189,692	85.22%
Invalid or blank votes		32,897	14.78%
Total votes		222,589	100.00%
Nacionalista hold			

Incumbent Mark Aries Luancing is running for reelection. His opponents are incumbent councilor Camille Angeline Lopez and former councilor Nonato Monfero.

Lipa City Vice Mayoralty Election
Party	Candidate	Votes	%
Reporma	Camille Angeline Lopez	85,319	44.32%
Nacionalista	Mark Aries Luancing	76,193	41.53%
Partido ng Masang Lipeño	Nonato "Patmon" Monfero	21,954	11.97%
Margin of victory		9,126	4.97
Valid ballots		183,466	83.77%
Invalid or blank votes		39,133	16.23%
Total votes		222,589	100.00
Reporma gain from Nacionalista			

2022 Lipa City Council Elections
Party	Candidate	Votes	%
Nacionalista	Mikee Morada	138,938	
Nacionalista	Atty. Gally Angeles	110,827	
Nacionalista	Spye Toledo	107,272	
Nacionalista	Oscar "Jun Jun" Gozos II	105,708	
Nacionalista	Nicole Ronquillo	105,268	
Nacionalista	Venice Manalo	104,411	
Nacionalista	Mike Lina	92,787	
Nacionalista	Merlo Silva	92,388	
Nacionalista	Avior "Tagumpay" Rocafort	89,697	
Nacionalista	King Umali	86,788	
Nacionalista	Aries Macala	81,408	
Nacionalista	Percival Lojo	81,352	
Partido ng Masang Lipeño	Beverly Luancing-Luna	72,049	
Partido ng Masang Lipeño	Reginald Laco	53,197	
Partido ng Masang Lipeño	Francis Meynard Sabili	51,662	
Partido ng Masang Lipeño	Carlo Latayan	46,267	
Partido ng Masang Lipeño	Drolah Sanchez	44,668	
Partido ng Masang Lipeño	Hazel Quinto	44,178	
Partido ng Masang Lipeño	Daryl Go	39,325	
Partido ng Masang Lipeño	Pol Joseph Garing	32,735	
Independent	Mario Panganiban	27,484	
Partido ng Masang Lipeño	Karlo Ramos	21,080	
Partido ng Masang Lipeño	Ronald "Aiko Mission" Hernandez	20,048	
Independent	Gerry America	17,684	
PFP	Mario Medina	16,208	
Independent	Ronald Lalong-Isip	15,976	
Reporma	Ed Villanueva	15,100	
Reporma	Erick Maulion	13,241	
Partido ng Masang Lipeño	Porfirio Elmer Reyes	12,225	
Reporma	Earl Jherese Camacho	10,851	
Independent	Jomar Ong	9,926	
Independent	Mateo Avegail Leynes	8,459	
Independent	Ramir Bathan	8,138	
Independent	Glenn Yabut	3,634	
Total votes			
