= Antonio Halili =

Filipino politician (1946–2018)

Mayor of Tanauan
- In office June 30, 2013 – July 2, 2018
- Vice Mayor: Jhoanna Corona-Villamor
- Preceded by: Sonia Torres-Aquino
- Succeeded by: Jhoanna Corona-Villamor
- In office March 1992 – June 30, 1992
- Preceded by: Sotero Olfato
- Succeeded by: Cesar Platon

Personal details
- Born: Antonio Cando Halili; February 8, 1946 Manila, Philippines
- Died: July 2, 2018 (aged 72) Tanauan, Batangas, Philippines
- Cause of death: Assassination by gunshot
- Spouse: Angelina Perez Yson
- Children: 2 (including Mary Angeline Halili)

Antonio Cando Halili (February 8, 1946 – July 2, 2018) was a Filipino politician who served as the Mayor of Tanauan, Batangas in 1992 and from 2013 until his assassination in 2018. His term as mayor was controversial due to his methods of dealing with crime and illegal drugs in the city. On July 2, 2018, he was shot and killed by an unknown gunman during a flag ceremony at the Tanauan City Hall.

== Business career ==
Prior to pursuing a political career, Antonio Halili was a businessman. He established ANC Halili Group of Companies (ANC HGC), a fully Filipino-owned conglomerate with its subsidiaries involved in the real estate, information technology, and private emission and drug industries. ANC HGC runs 60 emission testing centers in Luzon alone.

== Political career ==
=== Mayor of Tanauan ===
Halili became mayor of Tanauan, a then-town in the province of Batangas in the Philippines, in 1992, succeeding Sotero Olfato, who resigned to run for Governor of Batangas. He held the position for only three months. At the same time, he ran for mayor of Tanauan but lost to Cesar Platon.

He gained his old post, this time as city mayor, in 2013. He was re-elected in 2016. During his term as mayor, he gained notoriety for his treatment of suspected criminals, namely those involved in drug-related crimes. In 2016, Halili became the center of newfound attention after he ordered drug suspects to be paraded around the city, in a campaign that was dubbed the ‘walk of shame’. Suspected criminals were forced to wear cardboard signs that read, “I'm a pusher, don't emulate me”. His campaign was criticized by human rights groups and other politicians. Later on in his term, Halili himself would be accused of having drug-related ties, an accusation he denied. In October 2017, he had his supervisory powers over the local police stripped from him.

== Assassination ==
On July 2, 2018, Halili was shot by an unidentified sniper during a flag-raising ceremony at the Tanauan City Hall. The bullet hit a mobile phone in Halili's pocket and pierced his chest. Halili's bodyguards fired back towards a hill where the bullet appeared to have come from. The police searched the hill but failed to find anyone. Bystanders were shocked, and began panicking and taking cover.

Halili was driven to the Reyes Memorial Hospital and he was declared dead less than an hour after being shot. Philippine National Police Chief Director General Oscar Albayalde said that a regional special task group had been convened to investigate the killing, and was considering the suspect parades as a motive. One day later, another Philippine mayor, Ferdinand Bote of General Tinio, Nueva Ecija, was shot dead, also by a sniper.
