= Mary Angeline Halili =

Filipino politician

The Honorable Mary Angeline Halili

Mayor of Tanauan
- In office June 30, 2019 – June 30, 2022
- Vice mayor: Herminigildo Trinidad Jr.
- Preceded by: Jhoanna Villamor
- Succeeded by: Nelson P. Collantes

Personal details
- Born: Mary Angeline Yson Halili Tanauan, Batangas, Philippines
- Party: PDDS (2021–present)
- Other political affiliations: UNA (2018–2021)
- Relations: Antonio Halili (father)
- Profession: Politician

Mary Angeline "Sweet" Yson Halili is a Filipino politician who last served as mayor of Tanauan from 2019 to 2022. She is the daughter of former mayor Antonio Halili, who was assassinated on July 2, 2018. She vied for a seat in Congress for Batangas's 3rd district in 2022, but lost to incumbent Ma. Theresa Collantes.
