= Assassination of Antonio Halili =

2018 shooting in Tanauan, Batangas, Philippines

- Part of the Philippine drug war
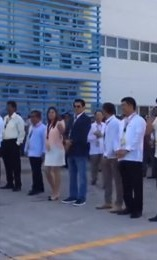
- Antonio Halili (in dark blue) moments before his assassination. On his right is his vice mayor (in pink).
- Location: Tanauan City Hall, Tanauan, Batangas, Philippines
- Date: July 2, 2018
- Target: Antonio Halili
- Attack type: Assassination by shooting
- Weapon: M16 rifle
- Deaths: Antonio Halili
- Assailant: Unknown suspects
- No. of participants: 3
- Motive: Under investigation, possibly politics

On July 2, 2018, Antonio Halili, the mayor of Tanauan, Batangas in the Philippines, was shot by an unknown shooter during a flag ceremony at the city hall. He was rushed to a nearby hospital, where was pronounced dead at 8:45 A.M. (PhST), less than an hour after the shooting. He was the second mayor of Tanauan to be assassinated after Cesar Platon in April 2001.

Following the assassination, the Philippine National Police launched an investigation, and at least three suspects were involved in the assassination according to the authorities. Several angles were investigated as possible motives, including Halili's controversial campaign against drugs during his tenure as mayor of the city, though there were no suspects publicly named or apprehended.

== Background ==
The victim of the assassination, Antonio Halili was the mayor of Tanauan, a city in the northeast of Batangas province. In 2016, he garnered wide public attention for his "Walk of Shame" campaign which involved publicly parading drug suspects, who were made to wear cardboard signs that read "I'm a pusher, don't emulate me." The act raised concerns from human rights officials. Halili publicly supported President Rodrigo Duterte's national campaign against illegal drugs, but believed that drug kingpins should be the main target of the police operations.

Allegedly, Halili himself was involved in the illegal drug trade according to police. The politician strongly denied the claim, and said that he would resign and have himself publicly paraded as a drug suspect if the police were able to come up with evidence to support the allegation. The mayor was stripped of supervisory powers over the local police in October 2017 due to the proliferation of illegal drugs in his city.

== Assassination ==
On July 2, 2018, Antonio Halili was attending a flag ceremony together with vice mayor Jhoanna Villamor and around 300 local government employees as well as the newly elected barangay officials of the city. The ceremony was filmed from various angles by the attendees. During the singing of the national anthem, near the end of the song, a single shot, initially reported by various news outlets as coming from a sniper, was fired and heard across the scene, as panic quickly ensued. Halili was seen to be able to run for a few moments before collapsing on the ground. Several warning shots were fired by city hall security as Halili's detail quickly transported the mayor to a van. He was rushed to a nearby hospital, where he was pronounced dead at 8:45 A.M. (PhST), less than an hour after the shooting. Halili was shot through his left chest.

== Investigation ==
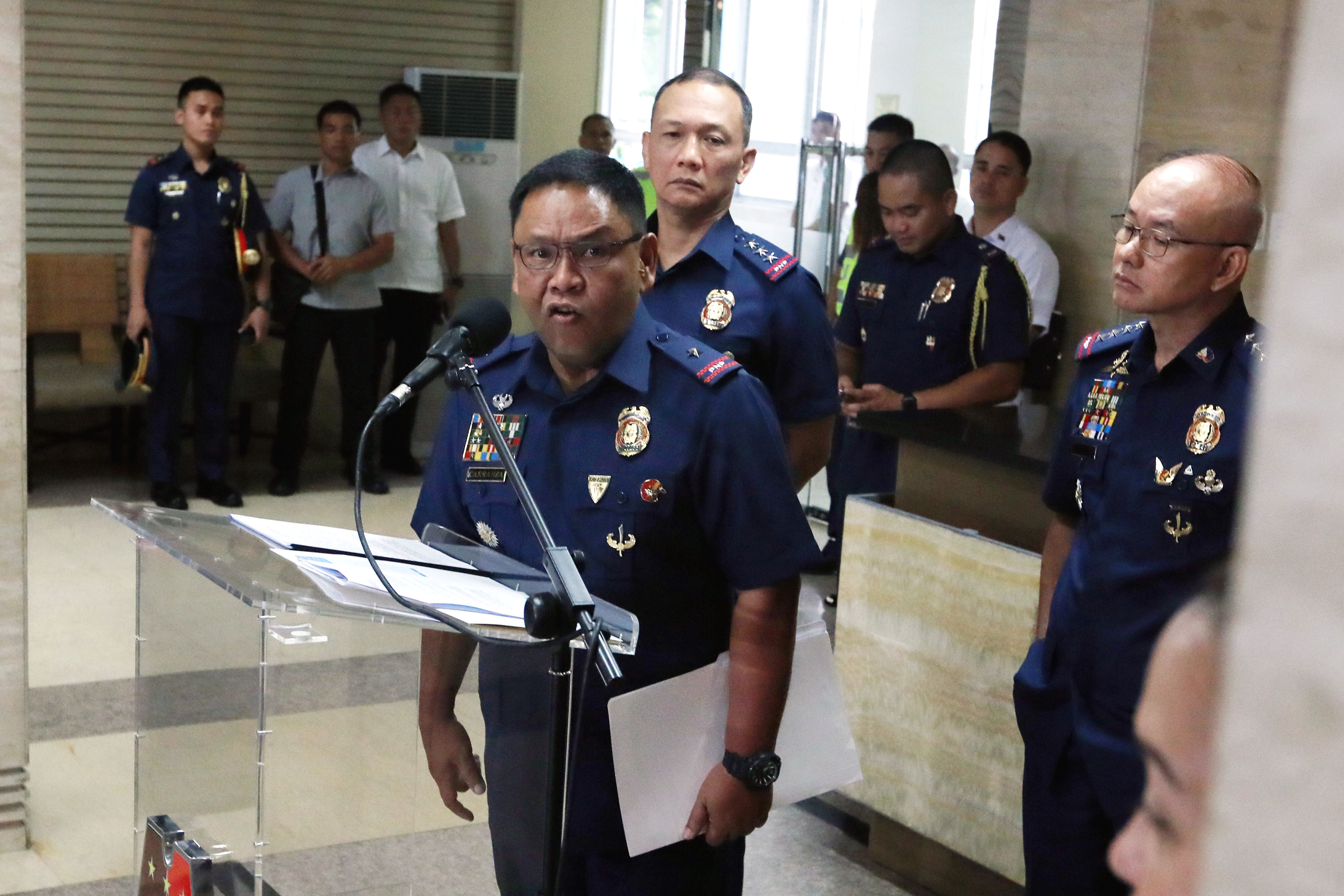
PNP PRO4-A Acting Regional Director Police Chief Edward Carranza announced in a press conference on July 9, 2018, at Camp Crame in Quezon City, that personal security personnel, and the police, were responsible for the close-in security of Halili when he was shot during the flag raising ceremony at the Tanauan City Hall.

Philippine National Police Chief Oscar Albayalde ordered the creation of a special investigation task group with Calabarzon regional director Edward Carranza acting on the order.

=== Suspects ===
The police identified two "persons of interest" who were suspected of playing a role in Halili's killing. A third suspect was also in the process of identification. All of these people are said to be involved in the illegal drug trade. The gunman who killed Halili is suspected to be working with accomplices.

On August 22, CCTV footage was revealed showing a white car owned by a suspected gunman parks near the gasoline station – about 1 kilometer away from the incident – dated July 2. A man emerges from the car wearing a black T-shirt and green cap, and, not less than ten minutes later, returns to the car and drives away. Another showing the car driving back-and-forth at the memorial park near the City Hall where the incident took place. Soon after the incident, another CCTV showed the same car driving the expressway; it was revealed that the plate number of the car was changed, suspected that it is the getaway vehicle, and, according to the police, the plate number seen in the gas station was actually not issued by the Land Transportation Franchising and Regulatory Board (LTFRB). The man is yet to be identified by the police.

At a hearing by the House of Representatives of the Philippines on extrajudicial killings during the drug war on October 11, 2024, former senior PNP official Royina Garma accused a then-police major of "boasting" about his role in Halili's assassination.

=== Possible motive ===
The police is considering the motive of the assassination to be related to the illegal drug trade, due to the identities of their designated "persons of interest" although they are not ruling out political motives for the killing. According to Philippine National Police Chief Oscar Albayalde, the police are also looking into a land dispute and a feud with a former high-ranking general in relation to the motive of the crime.

=== Circumstances of the killing ===
The police held a reenactment of the crime on July 5, 2018. A spent shell of a 5.6 mm (0.22 in) bullet was found by the police on an empty lot where the unidentified gunman positioned himself for the hit. The police has not ascertained that the bullet came from the gunman's weapon. The weapon is concluded not to be a sniper, since the gunman decided to hit Halili in the chest and was viewed as not "confident" enough to aim for the mayor's head.

It was initially reported that the distance between the gunman and Halili was 160 meters (520 ft) but was later established by the police to be just 76.8 meters (252 ft). The gunman was also concluded to have positioned himself on a higher elevation than the ground the mayor was standing.

== Aftermath ==
On April 3, 2019, at least 19 armed men disguised as police abducted two of Halili's aides, Allan Fajardo and Ricky Atienza, at the hotel in Santa Rosa, Laguna. The authorities said that they did not conduct any operation against Fajardo, who is a top aide of Halili. The suspects escaped using a white van with no license plate.

== See also ==
- List of unsolved murders (2000–present)
- Assassination of Ninoy Aquino – A similar event occurred where it targeted a political opposition leader
