= 2010 Antipolo local elections =

Philippine election

2010 Antipolo City mayoral election
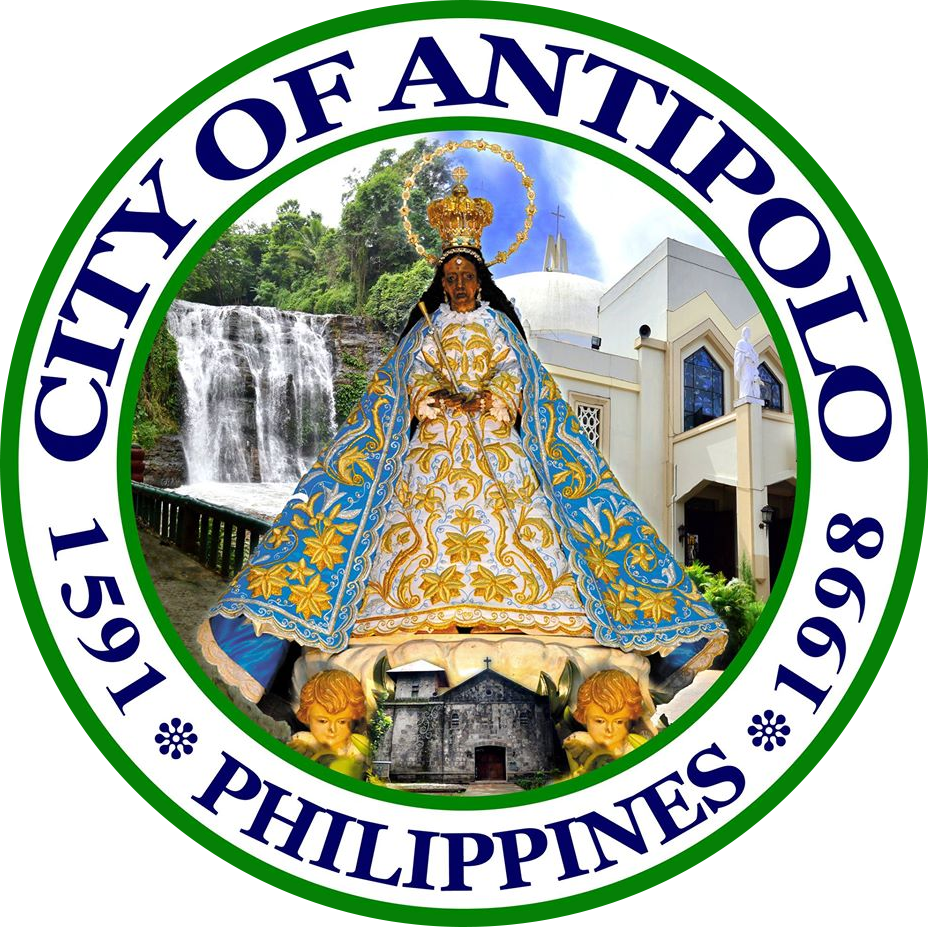
← 2007	May 10, 2010	2013 →
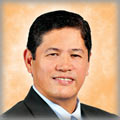
Nominee	Danilo "Nilo" Leyble	Angelito Gatlabayan
Party	Lakas	NPC
Running mate	Susana Garcia-Say	Serafin "Apin" Alvaran
Popular vote	120,783	97,061
Percentage	54.98	44.18
Mayor before election
Danilo "Nilo" Leyble
Lakas
Elected mayor
Danilo "Nilo" Leyble
Lakas

Local elections was held in Antipolo on May 10, 2010, within the Philippine general election. The voters elected candidates for the elective local posts in the city: the mayor, vice mayor, the two district congressmen, two provincial board members of Rizal, one for each district, and the sixteen councilors, eight in each of the city's districts.

== Background ==
On January 6, 2009, almost a year after elections, then-Mayor Victor Sumulong died because of multiple organ failure due to diabetes. Vice Mayor Danilo "Nilo" Leyble immediately took place as acting mayor, with Second District Councilor Lorenzo Zapanta as acting vice mayor.

Acting Mayor Danilo "Nilo" Leyble ran as mayor, seeking first full term as mayor. He was challenged by former Mayor and incumbent Second District Representative Angelito Gatlabayan, Silverio "Ver" Bulanon, Wilfredo "Willie" Garcia, and Edgardo "Ed" Purawan.

Acting Vice Mayor Lorenzo Zapanta did not run for reelection. He ran as representative of Second District. Susana Garcia-Say ran for his place instead. Garcia was challenged by former First District Councilor Serafin "Apin" Alvaran, Basilio Mendoza, Maria Teresa "Tess" Trinidad, and Glicerio "Toto" Vallega.

Incumbent First District Representative Roberto Puno sought for his second term. He was challenged by Ricardo "Carding" Dapat, Florante "Ante" Quizon, Primer "Prime" Pagunuran, and Salvador "Raldy" Abaño.

Incumbent Second District Angelito Gatlabayan ran for Mayor. Acting Vice Mayor Lorenzo Zapanta ran for his place instead. Zapanta was challenged by former Councilor and former Rizal Vice Governor Jestoni Alarcon, Lorenzo Juan "LJ" Sumulong III, Romeo Acop, Marcelino "Boyet" Arellano, Hoover "Ver" Simbillo, Virginia "Gie" Mendoza, and Federico "Dick" Marquez, brother of incumbent First District Councilor and re-electionist Alexander "Bobot" Marquez.

Incumbent First District Board Member Arnel Camacho did not run for re-election. Agripino "Atan" Garcia ran for his place. Garcia was challenged by First District Councilor Ronald Barcena, Jacinto "Ento" Canales, Dr. Enrico "Rico" De Guzman, and Federico 'Erik" Zapanta.

Incumbent Second District Board Member Zacarias Tapales did not run for re-election; he ran as councilor for Second District instead. Incumbent Second District Councilor Jesus Angelito "Joel" Huertas Jr. ran for his place. Huertas was challenged by Nelia "Nel" Bulanon and German "Gerry" Mata.

== Results ==
=== For Mayor ===
Acting Mayor Danilo "Nilo" Leyble won against incumbent Second District Representative Angelito Gatlabayan in the mayoral race.

Antipolo mayoral elections
Party	Candidate	Votes	%
Lakas	Danilo "Nilo" Leyble	120,783	54.98
NPC	Angelito Gatlabayan	97,061	44.18
Independent	Wilfredo Garcia	1,008	0.46
Independent	Silverio Bulanon	503	0.23
PGRP	Edgardo Purawan	346	0.16
Total votes		219,701	100.00
Lakas hold			

=== For Vice Mayor ===
Susana Garcia-Say defeated former First District Councilor Serafin "Apin" Alvaran.

Antipolo vice mayoral elections
Party	Candidate	Votes	%
Lakas	Susana Garcia-Say	120,874	57.74
NPC	Serafin Alvaran	65,051	31.07
Liberal	Maria Teresa Trinidad	18,637	8.90
Independent	Basilio Mendoza	3,132	1.50
Independent	Glicerio Vallega	1,643	0.78
Total votes		209,337	100.00
Lakas hold			

=== For Representative ===
==== First District ====
Rep. Roberto Puno was re-elected. Puno defeated Ricardo Dapat of Nationalist People's Coalition.

Congressional election for Antipolo's First district
Party	Candidate	Votes	%
Lakas	Roberto Puno	67,500	62.08
NPC	Ricardo Dapat	37,546	34.53
Independent	Florante Quizon	1,381	1.27
Independent	Primer Pagunuran	1,202	1.11
Independent	Salvador Abaño	1,095	1.01
Valid ballots		108,724	91.99
Invalid or blank votes		9,472	8.01
Total votes		118,196	100.00
Lakas hold			

==== Second District ====
Romeo Acop defeated other prominent candidates, including Lorenzo Juan "LJ" Sumulong III, former Vice Governor Jestoni Alarcon, Federico Marquez, and Acting Vice Mayor Lorenzo Zapanta.

Congressional election for Antipolo's Second District
Party	Candidate	Votes	%
Independent	Romeo Acop	32,281	31.36
Liberal	Lorenzo "LJ" Sumulong III	24,907	24.20
Independent	Anthony Jesus "Jestoni" Alarcon	20,159	19.59
NPC	Federico Marquez	15,057	14.63
Lakas	Lorenzo Zapanta	6,961	6.76
Independent	Marcelino Arellano	2,924	2.84
Independent	Hoover Simbillo	374	0.36
Independent	Virginia Mendoza	262	0.25
Valid ballots		102,925	93.26
Invalid or blank votes		7,441	6.74
Total votes		110,366	100.00
Independent gain from Lakas			

=== For City Councilors ===
Party	Votes	%	Seats
Lakas–CMD	638,582	45.72	14
Nationalist People's Coalition	422,147	30.22	2
Liberal Party	144,060	10.31	0
Ang Kapatiran	5,472	0.39	0
Independent	186,548	13.36	0
Ex officio seats			2
Total	1,396,809	100.00	18

==== First District ====
City Council Election for Antipolo's First District
Party	Candidate	Votes	%
Lakas	Alexander Marquez	47,569	6.54
Lakas	Prudencio Aquino	46,589	6.40
Lakas	Bernard Leo Zapanta	45,562	6.26
Lakas	Pablo Oldan Jr.	41,923	5.76
Lakas	Juanito Lawis	41,711	5.73
Lakas	Troadio Reyes	40,817	5.61
Lakas	Eufracio Tapales	39,102	5.37
Lakas	Mario Garcia	38,559	5.30
NPC	Mario Bacani	36,473	5.01
NPC	Justo Gilbert de Jesus	32,889	4.52
Liberal	Bernardo Gatlabayan	31,877	4.38
NPC	Roderick Agustin	31,183	4.28
NPC	Sonia Ampo	27,575	3.79
NPC	Lynn Alegre	25,285	3.47
NPC	Jose Bienvenido Revil	24,760	3.40
Independent	Jesus Palileo	20,582	2.83
NPC	Apolonio Samson	19,033	2.62
Liberal	Maria Shiela Dioso	18,734	2.57
NPC	Rolando Avendaño	17,676	2.43
Liberal	Wilfredo Zacarias	17,257	2.37
Independent	Lauro Tapales	16,413	2.26
Liberal	John Joriel Samoy	9,419	1.29
Independent	Antonio Mendoza Jr.	8,313	1.14
Independent	Jonathan Gonzales	8,146	1.12
Independent	Armando Adame	6,636	0.91
Independent	Viviano Picayo	5,653	0.78
Independent	Armie Gacilo	5,228	0.72
Independent	Billy Gamboa	4,926	0.68
Independent	Joralyn Grafil	3,563	0.49
Independent	Bernardo Tañedo	3,470	0.48
Independent	Dioscoro Sinilong Jr.	3,119	0.43
Independent	Zaldy Nuez	2,932	0.40
Independent	Antonio Lagorin	2,813	0.39
Independent	Ernesto Caones	2,049	0.28
Total votes		727,836	100.00

==== Second District ====
City Council Election for Antipolo's Second District
Party	Candidate	Votes	%
Lakas	Ronaldo Leyva	49,751	7.44
NPC	Christian Edward Alarcon	44,590	6.67
Lakas	Edward O'Hara	41,237	6.16
Lakas	Corazon Braga	40,073	5.99
Lakas	Celestino Gatlabayan	39,708	5.94
Lakas	Edilberto Lagasca	35,559	5.32
Lakas	Zacarias Tapales	34,676	5.18
NPC	Nixon Aranas	32,037	4.79
Lakas	Antonio Masangkay	30,238	4.52
NPC	Josme Macabuhay	27,046	4.04
NPC	Armando Masangkay	25,905	3.87
Lakas	Danilo Silva	25,508	3.81
NPC	Romulo Andrade	24,563	3.67
NPC	Enrico Ferdinand Naidas	20,592	3.08
NPC	Ricardo Immaculata	17,030	2.55
NPC	Catalina Hernandez	15,510	2.32
Liberal	Carlito Pedracio	14,039	2.10
Liberal	Daryl dela Cruz	12,769	1.91
Liberal	Armando de Guzman	11,240	1.68
Liberal	Alejandro Bautista Jr.	11,073	1.66
Liberal	Hipolito Espiritu	10,597	1.58
Independent	Rafael Martinez	9,546	1.43
Independent	Joel Tatad	8,737	1.31
Independent	Antonio Reillo	7,551	1.13
Independent	Mario Abriam	7,119	1.06
Liberal	Danilo Quizon	7,055	1.05
Independent	Nestor Jornacion	6,689	1.00
Independent	Fowad-Azam Malik	6,631	0.99
Independent	Elmer Inlayo Sr.	6,568	0.98
Independent	Antonio Martinez	5,630	0.84
Ang Kapatiran	Irvin Bautista	5,472	0.82
Independent	Lucio Javier	4,555	0.68
Independent	Rogelio Cabasbas	4,538	0.68
Independent	Jose Velasco	3,620	0.54
Independent	Cesar dela Rosa	3,460	0.52
Independent	Nestor Arceo	3,284	0.49
Independent	Danilo Dipad	3,027	0.45
Independent	Joseph Paluyo	2,815	0.42
Independent	Rogelio Sumicad	2,557	0.38
Independent	Trinitario Caber	2,447	0.37
Independent	Ailene Novero	1,649	0.25
Independent	Ruby Tuppil	1,157	0.17
Independent	Lorenzo Narito Sr.	1,125	0.17
Total votes		668,973	100.00
