= 2004 Antipolo local elections =

Philippine election

2004 Antipolo City mayoral election
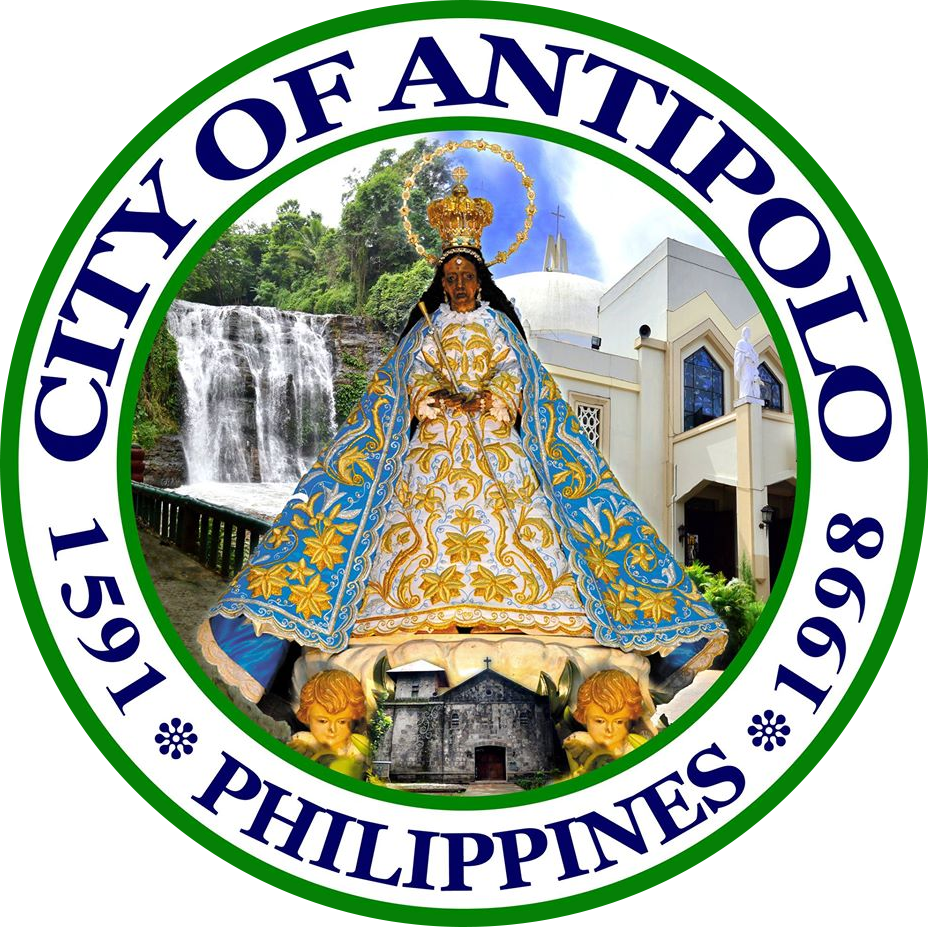
- May 10, 2004
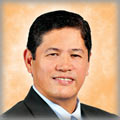
Nominee	Angelito Gatlabayan	Susana Garcia-Say
Party	Lakas	KNP
Running mate	Danilo Leyble (NPC)	Troadio Reyes (Lakas)
Popular vote	90,233	77,477
Percentage	53.57	45.99
Mayor before election
Angelito Gatlabayan
Lakas
Elected mayor
Angelito Gatlabayan
Lakas

Local elections was held in Antipolo on May 10, 2004, within the Philippine general election. The voters elected candidates for the elective local posts in the city: the mayor, vice mayor, the two district congressmen, two provincial board members of Rizal, one for each district, and the sixteen councilors, eight in each of the city's districts.

== Background ==
On December 22, 2003, the Municipality of Antipolo was converted into a city, and its lone district was dissolved into two.

Incumbent Mayor Angelito Gatlabayan ran for his third and final term. He was challenged by Susana Garcia-Say.

Second District Councilor Danilo "Nilo" Leyble ran as vice mayor.

Former DILG Secretary Ronaldo Puno ran for his first term as representative of the newly created First District. He was challenged by Josefina "Pining" Gatlabayan, wife of incumbent Mayor Angelito Gatlabayan.

Incumbent Lone District Representative Victor Sumulong ran for his first time as representative of the newly created Second District, and third term as representative of Antipolo's lone district (dissolved). He was challenged by former Vice Mayor and OIC-Mayor Felix Mariñas.

== Results ==
=== For Mayor ===
Mayor Angelito Gatlabayan won the elections against Susana Garcia-Say.

Antipolo mayoral election
Party	Candidate	Votes	%
Lakas	Angelito Gatlabayan (incumbent)	90,233	53.57
KNP	Susana Garcia-Say	77,477	45.99
PDP–Laban	Silverio Bulanon	742	0.44
Total votes		168,452	100.00
Lakas hold			

=== For Vice Mayor ===
Councilor Danilo Leyble won the elections.

Antipolo vice mayoral election
Party	Candidate	Votes	%
NPC	Danilo Leyble	79,776	52.80
Lakas	Troadio Reyes	64,412	42.63
PDP–Laban	Virginia Mendoza	5,353	3.54
Independent	Lauro Tapucar	1,564	1.04
Total votes		151,105	100.00
NPC hold			

=== For Representative ===
==== First District ====
Former DILG Secretary Ronaldo "Ronnie" Puno defeated Josefina "Pining" Gatlabayan, wife of incumbent Mayor Angelito Gatlabayan.

Congressional election for Antipolo's First District
Party	Candidate	Votes	%
Lakas	Ronaldo Puno	49,176	
KAMPI	Josefina "Pining" Gatlabayan	33,334	
	Florante Quizon	400	
	Tertullano Guevarra Jr.	381	
	Macario Aggarao	226	
	Ariel Zartiga	42	
Total votes			100.00
Lakas hold			

==== Second District ====
Incumbent Lone District representative Victor Sumulong defeated former Vice Mayor and OIC-Mayor Felix Mariñas.

Congressional election for Antipolo's Second District
Party	Candidate	Votes	%
Lakas	Victor Sumulong	40,031	
	Felix Mariñas	26,974	
	Rodrigo Ceron	6,839	
Total votes			100.00
Lakas hold			

=== For City Councilors ===
==== First District ====
City Council election for Antipolo's First District
Party	Candidate	Votes	%
Lakas	Serafin Alvaran		
Lakas	Eufracio Tapales		
Lakas	Bernard Leo Zapanta		
Lakas	Ronald Barcena		
Lakas	Pablo Oldan Jr.		
Lakas	Alexander Marquez		
Lakas	Marino Bacani		
Lakas	Evelyn Querubin		

==== Second District ====
City Council election for Antipolo's Second District
Party	Candidate	Votes	%
Lakas	Lorenzo Zapanta		
Lakas	Corazon Braga		
Lakas	Ronaldo Leyva		
Lakas	German Mata		
Lakas	Jesus Angelito Huertas Jr.		
Lakas	Humberto Bautista		
Lakas	Nixon Aranas		
Lakas	Josme Macabuhay		
