= Mambugan National High School =

Public high school in Rizal, Philippines

Coordinates: 14°37′24″N 121°08′32″E

Information
- Established: 1999; 27 years ago

Mambugan National High School is a public high school located at Phase 3, Siruna Village, Brgy. Mambugan, Antipolo, Rizal, Philippines.

== History ==
Mambugan National High School, formerly named Antipolo National High School – Mambugan Extension, was established when the former Mayor Angelito Gatlabayan and the City Council passed the Resolution # 04 -99.

The school was established in June of 1999. Mambugan Elementary School lent three rooms which house the administration building and two classrooms with a population of 240 students and 5 faculty members. Marilyn D. Zapanta was the school head. The first official building of Mambugan National High School (ACG Bldg) was built in 2003 with four rooms in its own site located at Ruhat Hills, Siruna Village with a total land area of 3,200 m2. The ACG Bldg. was used by the second batch of students during their fourth year. The first graduation of Mambugan National High School on the new site was April 2004 with 215 graduates.

The land area of the school became bigger with the initiative of the local government. In 2006, another building, the Principal and Admin Office, was built. Several buildings were then constructed after that as follows:

Building Name	Year Constructed
Covered Court	2007
Stage	2009
SEF Building	2009
PLB 2 Building	2009
DPWH Building	2018

Today, MNHS has 33 classrooms, five computer labs, a library, a clinic, a TLE Room, the Administration Building (Principal, OIC, Liaison and Accounting Office), a covered court and stage.

There is a teaching force of 119, a principal, and two accounting staff.

In the succeeding years of the school, the population gradually increased as follows:

Batch Year	Total Population
1999 - 2000	240
2000 - 2001	525
2001 - 2002	1111
2002 - 2003	1582
2003 - 2004	1899
2004 - 2005	1999
2005 - 2006	2254
2006 - 2007	2086
2007 - 2008	2304
2008 - 2009	2721
2009 - 2010	3093
2010 - 2011	3629
2011 - 2012	3761
2012 - 2013	3999
2013 - 2014	4261

== Principals ==
Ms. Marilyn D. Zapanta was the first school head, from 1999 to September 15, 2005. Dr. Adelina M. Cruzada, was the principal from September 16, 2005 to Sept 20, 2011. Ms. Adelaida A. San Diego led from September 21, 2011 up to July 10, 2013. Mr. Rommel S. Beltran led from July 15, 2013 to June 2016, and Mrs. Anna Lyn P. Raymundo from June 5, 2016 up to the present.
