= 2007 Antipolo local elections =

Philippine election

2007 Antipolo mayoral election
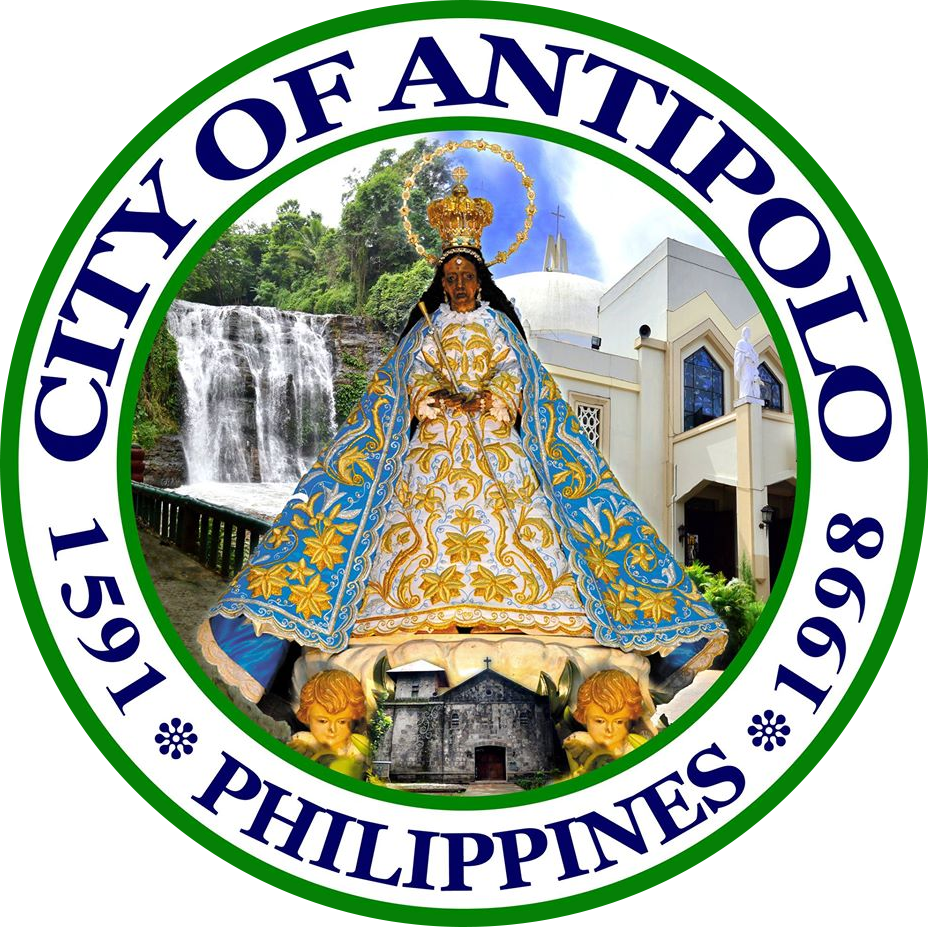
- May 14, 2007
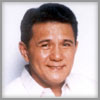
Nominee	Victor Sumulong	Susana Garcia-Say
Party	KAMPI	Independent
Running mate	Federico Marquez	Eleazar Salonga (UNO)
Popular vote	75,088	70,458
Percentage	51.59	48.41
Mayor before election
Angelito Gatlabayan
Lakas
Elected mayor
Victor Sumulong
KAMPI

Local elections was held in Antipolo on May 14, 2007, within the Philippine general election. The voters elected candidates for the elective local posts in the city: the mayor, vice mayor, the two district congressmen, two provincial board members of Rizal, one for each district, and the sixteen councilors, eight in each of the city's districts.

== Background ==
Incumbent Mayor Angelito Gatlabayan was on his third and final term. He ran as representative of Second District. Incumbent Second District Representative Victor Sumulong ran for his place. Sumulong faced Gatlabayan's former opponent, Susana Garcia-Say.

Incumbent Vice Mayor Danilo Leyble ran for reelection.

Incumbent First District Representative Ronaldo Puno was elected in 2004. In 2006, he resigned in office and appointed as Secretary of Department of the Interior and Local Government by President Gloria Macapagal-Arroyo. His seat left vacant until election. His brother, Roberto Puno ran for his place. Puno was challenged by Florante Quizon and Amarante Velasco Jr.

Incumbent Second District Representative Victor Sumulong did not run for re-election. Incumbent Mayor Angelito Gatlabayan ran for his place instead. Gatlabayan was challenged by Vice Governor Jestoni Alarcon.

== Results ==
=== For Mayor ===
Second District Rep. Victor Sumulong won the elections.

Antipolo mayoral election
Party	Candidate	Votes	%
KAMPI	Victor Sumulong	75,088	51.59
Independent	Susana Garcia-Say	70,458	48.41
Total votes		145,546	100.00
KAMPI hold			

=== For Vice Mayor ===
Vice Mayor Danilo Leyble was re-elected.

Antipolo vice mayoral election
Party	Candidate	Votes	%
NPC	Danilo Leyble (incumbent)	62,295	45.60
KAMPI	Federico Marquez	43,555	31.88
UNO	Eleazar Salonga	16,512	12.09
Independent	Serafin Alvaran	14,240	10.42
Total votes		136,602	100.00
NPC hold			

=== For Representative ===
==== First District ====
Roberto Puno won the election.

Congressional election for Antipolo's First District
Party	Candidate	Votes	%
KAMPI	Roberto Puno	55,758	89.83
UNO	Florante Quizon	3,743	6.03
KBL	Amarante Velasco Jr.	2,571	4.14
Total votes		62,072	100.00
KAMPI hold			

==== Second District ====
Mayor Angelito Gatlabayan won the elections.

Congressional election for Antipolo City's Second District
Party	Candidate	Votes	%
KAMPI	Angelito Gatlabayan	46,216	69.60
UNO	Jestoni Alarcon	19,958	30.06
Independent	Tomasa Alarcon	225	0.34
Total votes		66,399	100.00
KAMPI hold			

=== For City Councilors ===
==== First District ====
City Council election for Antipolo's First District
Party	Candidate	Votes	%
KAMPI	Ronald Barcena	29,771	
KAMPI	Marino Bacani	29,145	
NPC	Bernard Leo "Boots" Zapanta	22,646	
KAMPI	Alexander "Bobot" Marquez	22,250	
NPC	Juanito "Dudok" Lawis	21,223	
KAMPI	Troadio "Adiong" Reyes	20,912	
KAMPI	Eufracio "Efren" Tapales	20,574	
KAMPI	Mario Garcia	20,550	

==== Second District ====
City Council election for Antipolo's Second District
Party	Candidate	Votes	%
KAMPI	Lorenzo "Enchong" Zapanta	32,762	
KAMPI	Ronaldo "Puto" Leyva	31,892	
KAMPI	Corazon "Cora" Braga	29,443	
KAMPI	Nixon Aranas	29,401	
KAMPI	Edward O'Hara	28,500	
NPC	German "Gerry" Mata	27,809	
NPC	Jesus Angelito "Joel" Huertas Jr.	27,644	
NPC	Celestino "Esting" Gatlabayan	20,891	

== Aftermath ==
Mayor Victor Sumulong died in office on January 6, 2009. Vice Mayor Danilo Leyble assumed office as acting mayor and Second District councilor Lorenzo Zapanta as acting vice mayor until 2010.
