= Victor Sumulong =

Filipino politician (1946–2009)

The Honourable Victor "Vic" Sumulong
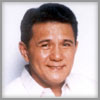

Mayor of Antipolo
- In office June 30, 2007 – January 6, 2009
- Vice Mayor: Danilo Leyble
- Preceded by: Angelito Gatlabayan
- Succeeded by: Danilo Leyble

Member of the House of Representatives from Antipolo
- In office June 30, 1998 – June 30, 2004
- Preceded by: Post created
- Succeeded by: Post dissolved
- Constituency: at-large district
- In office June 30, 2004 – June 30, 2007
- Preceded by: Post created
- Succeeded by: Angelito Gatlabayan
- Constituency: 2nd district

Undersecretary for the Department of the Interior and Local Government
- In office 1992–1996
- President: Fidel V. Ramos

Personal details
- Born: May 19, 1946 Manila, Philippines
- Died: January 6, 2009 (aged 62) Makati, Philippines
- Party: Lakas (2004–2007, 2008–2009)
- Other political affiliations: KAMPI (2007–2008); LDP (2001–2004); NPC (1998–2001)
- Spouse: Michelle Jalandoni
- Relations: Juan Sumulong (grandfather); Francisco Sumulong (uncle)
- Children: 3
- Parent(s): Lorenzo Sumulong (father); Estrella Rodriguez (mother)
- Education: Ateneo de Manila University; University of the Philippines Diliman
- Occupation: Politician

Victor Rodriguez Sumulong (May 19, 1946 – January 6, 2009) was a Filipino politician. He was a member of the House of Representatives of the Philippines from Antipolo. He was mayor of Antipolo and an undersecretary for the Department of the Interior and Local Government.

== Early life ==
Sumulong was born May 19, 1946 in Manila. His parents were Estrella Rodriguez and Lorenzo Sumulong, a lawyer and politician who served in the Senate of the Philippines. His paternal grandfather was Juan Sumulong, also a senator, and his uncle was Francisco Sumulong, who served in the House of Representatives of the Philippines. His cousin was Corazon Aquino, president of the Philippines.

Sumulong attended elementary school at De La Salle College and secondary school at the Ateneo de Manila University, graduating in 1964. He continued his studies at Ateneo de Manila University, receiving an A.B. in political science in 1968.

He graduated from the University of the Philippines Diliman with a Bachelor of Laws in 1973 and a Master of Laws in 1981. He was a member of Sigma Rho law fraternity. Sumulong also received a Master's in Business and Government Administration from Ateneo de Manila University in 1983.

== Political career ==
In 1971 to 1973, Sumulong worked as an administrative assistant for the Senate of the Philippines. He was then was an associate at the Sumulong Law Office from 1974 to 1978 Sumulong was theassistant secretary for the Department of Local Government and Community Development by President Ferdinand Marcos in 1975 to 1985. In 1987, he became a television host and producer for Isip Pinoy, Channel 9.

From 1992 to 1996, Sumulong served as Undersecretary for Local Government of the Department of the Interior and Local Government under the administration of President Fidel Ramos. He was also the executive director of the Presidential Committee on the Marilaque Growth Area from 1994 to 1998.

Sumulong was elected to the House of Representatives of the Philippines for the Antipolo at-large district, serving from June 30, 1998 to June 30, 2004. He served a second term for the 2nd District of Antipolo from June 30, 2004 to June 30, 2007. He was elected Mayor of Antipolo in 2007, serving from June 30, 2007 until he died in 2009.

== Personal life ==
Sumulong was married to Michelle Jalandoni. Their children were Maria Victoria, Mikaela Angela, and Christopher Emmanuel. His wife had schizophrenia and was found dead in their home in September 2003 from an apparent suicide.

He was the founder and president of Gabay para sa Kaunlaran ng Rizal, president of Sandiwanihang Pilipino at Kristiyano, and a member of Couples for Christ.

Sumulong died of organ failure resulting from diabetes at the Makati Medical Center in Makati on January 6, 2009, at the age of 62.

House of Representatives of the Philippines
New district	Congressman, Lone District of Antipolo; 1998–2004	District dissolved
New district	Congressman, 2nd District of Antipolo; 2004–2007	Succeeded by Angelito Gatlabayan
Political offices
Preceded by Angelito Gatlabayan	Mayor Antipolo; 2007–2009	Succeeded by Danilo Leyble
