= Angelito Gatlabayan =

Filipino politician

The Honourable Angelito Gatlabayan
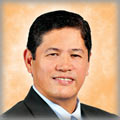
- Official portrait, 2007

Member of the Philippine House of Representatives from Antipolo's 2nd congressional district
- In office June 30, 2007 – June 30, 2010
- Preceded by: Victor Sumulong
- Succeeded by: Romeo Acop

Mayor of Antipolo
- In office June 30, 1998 – June 30, 2007
- Vice Mayor: Danilo Leyble (2004–2007)
- Preceded by: Daniel Garcia
- Succeeded by: Victor Sumulong

Personal details
- Born: Angelito Cabaron Gatlabayan; July 3, 1952 (age 74) Antipolo, Rizal
- Party: NPC (2009–present)
- Other political affiliations: Lakas (1998–2007, 2008–2009); KAMPI (2007–2008)
- Spouse: Josefina Galang
- Occupation: Politician
- Profession: Engineer

Angelito Cabaron Gatlabayan (born July 3, 1952), also referred to by his initials ACG, is a Filipino engineer and politician. He was the first City Mayor of Antipolo following its transition to cityhood, serving from 1998 to 2007. He was a member of the House of Representatives of the Philippines representing the 2nd District of Antipolo during the 14th Congress from 2007 to 2010. He is the husband of incumbent Rizal Vice Governor Josefina Gatlabayan.

== Early life ==
Gatlabayan was born in 1952 and raised by his parents, former Vice Mayor Maximo Leyva Gatlabayan and Catalina Legado Cabaron, in Antipolo. Before serving as a politician, he worked in various multinational companies such as Handyware Philippines, and Union Ajinomoto Philippines.

== Political career ==
As Antipolo transitioned from a municipality to a component city of Rizal, Gatlabayan was elected as its first city mayor on May 15, 1998 and was re-elected in a landslide victory to a second term on May 14, 2001. Mayor Gatlabayan was responsible for handling Antipolo's ₱800-million budget and served its 500,000 residents.

House of Representatives of the Philippines
Preceded by Victor R. Sumulong	Representative, 2nd District of Antipolo; 2007–2010	Succeeded by Romeo M. Acop
Political offices
Preceded by Daniel S. Garcia	Mayor, Antipolo; 1998–2007	Succeeded by Victor R. Sumulong
