= Antipolo =

Capital city of Rizal, Philippines

- Component city
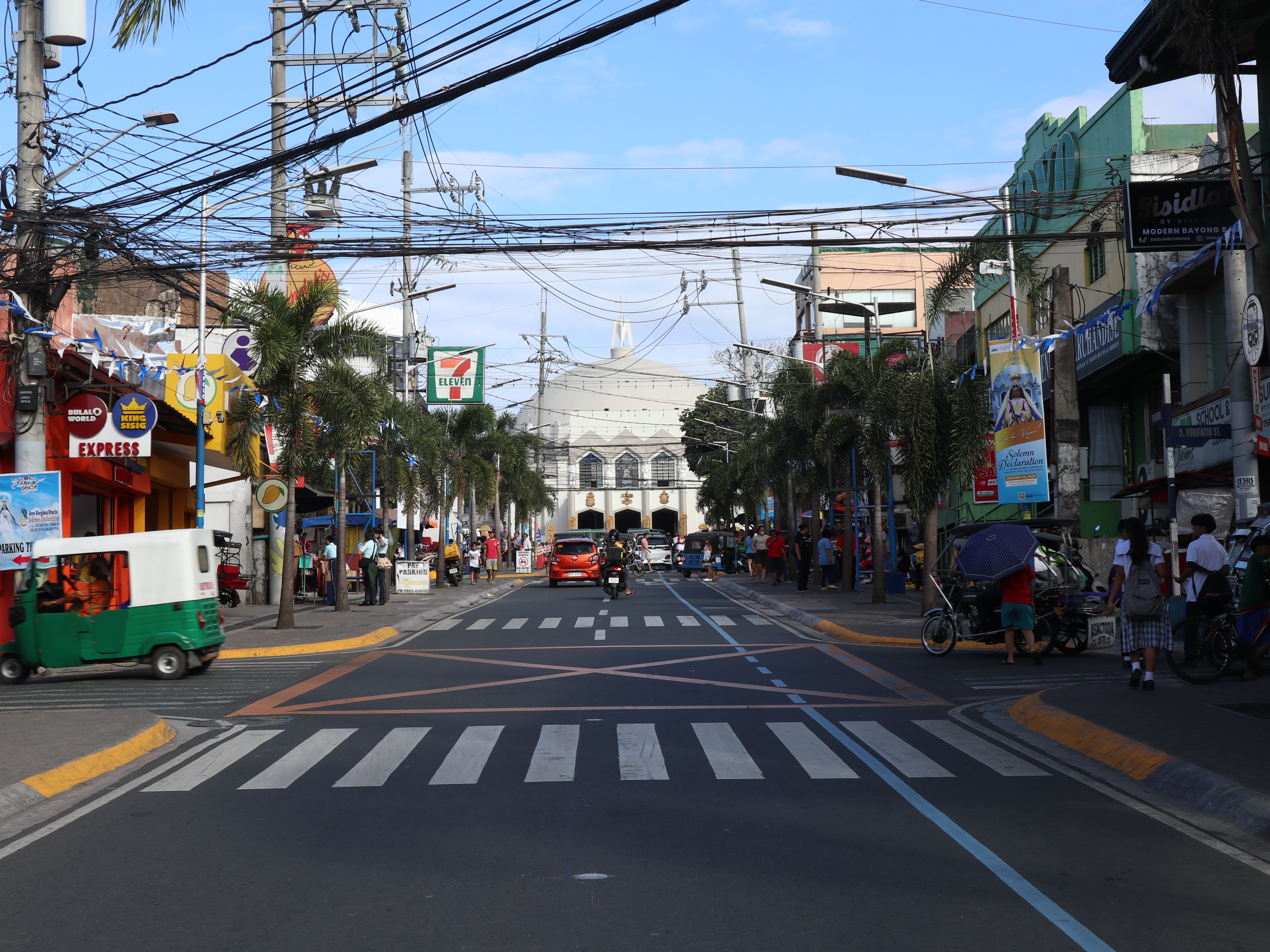
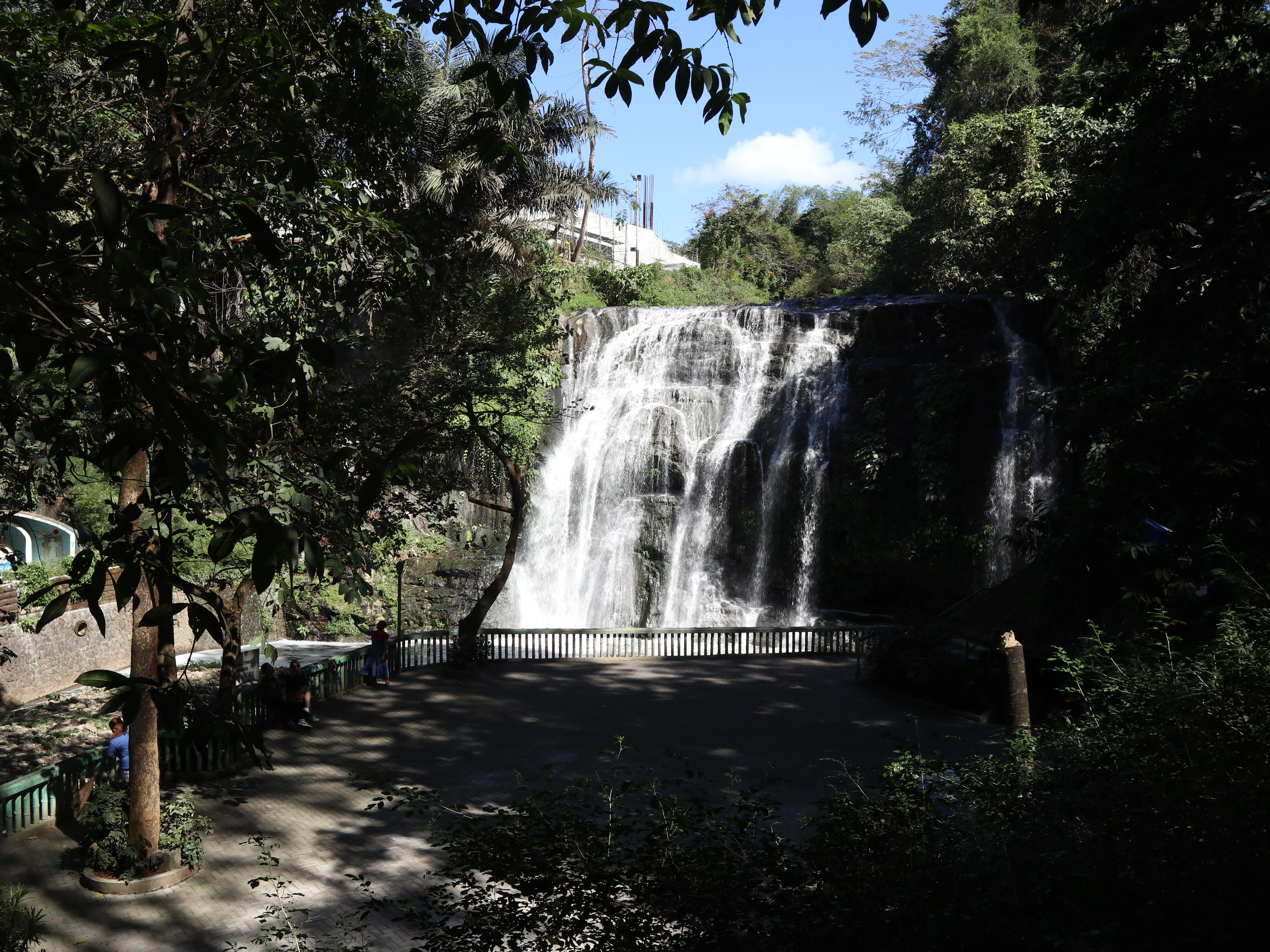
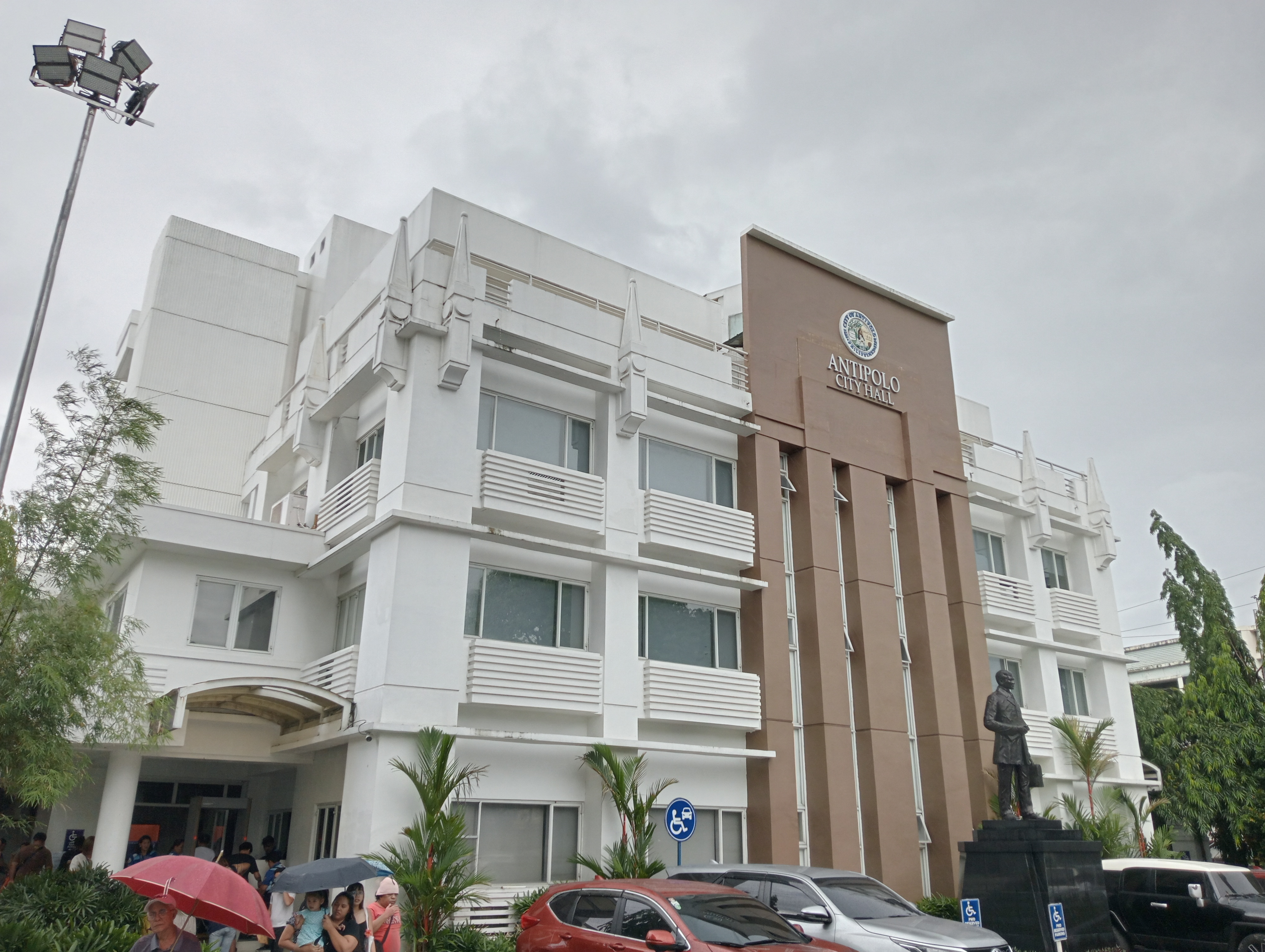
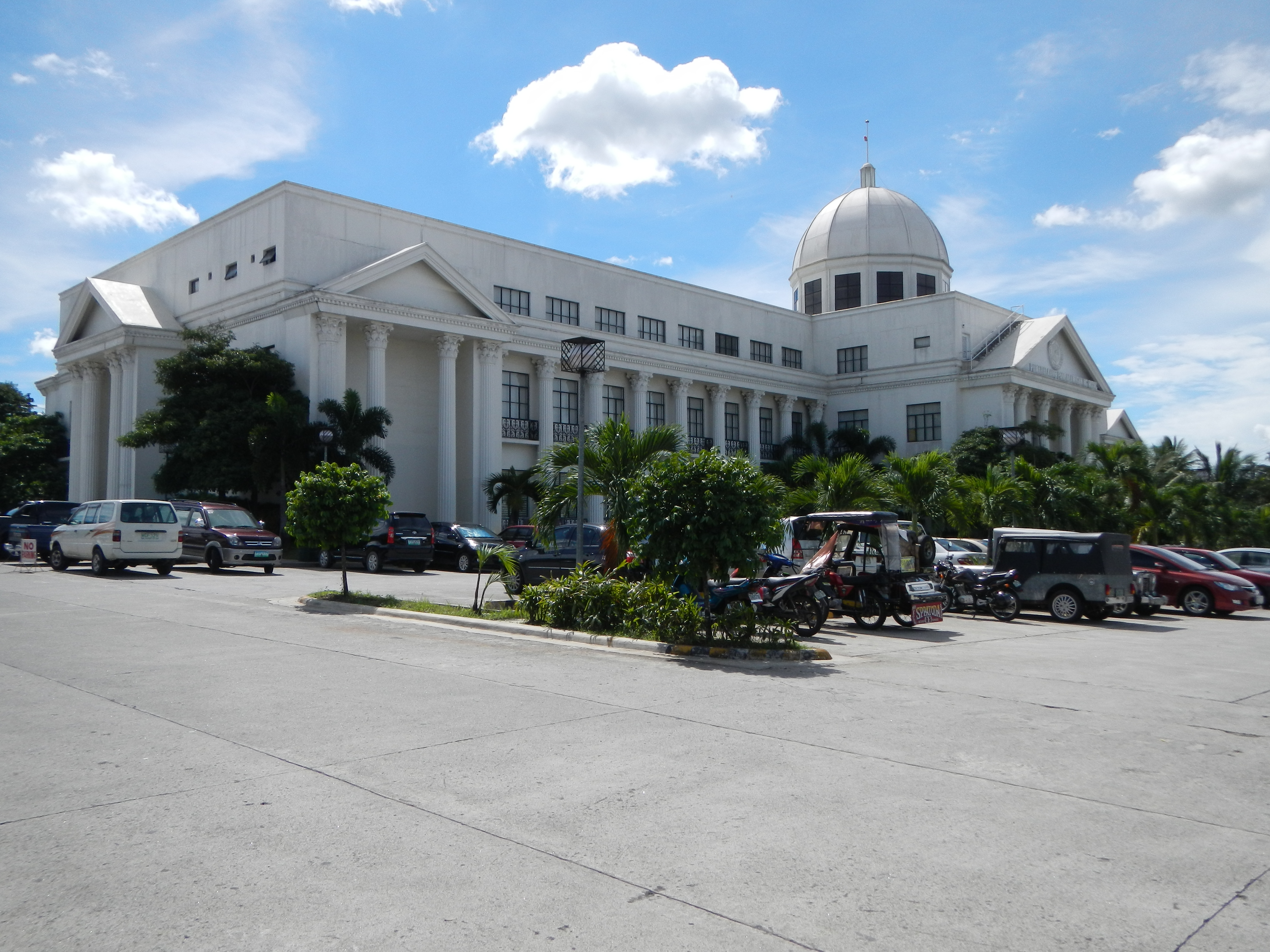
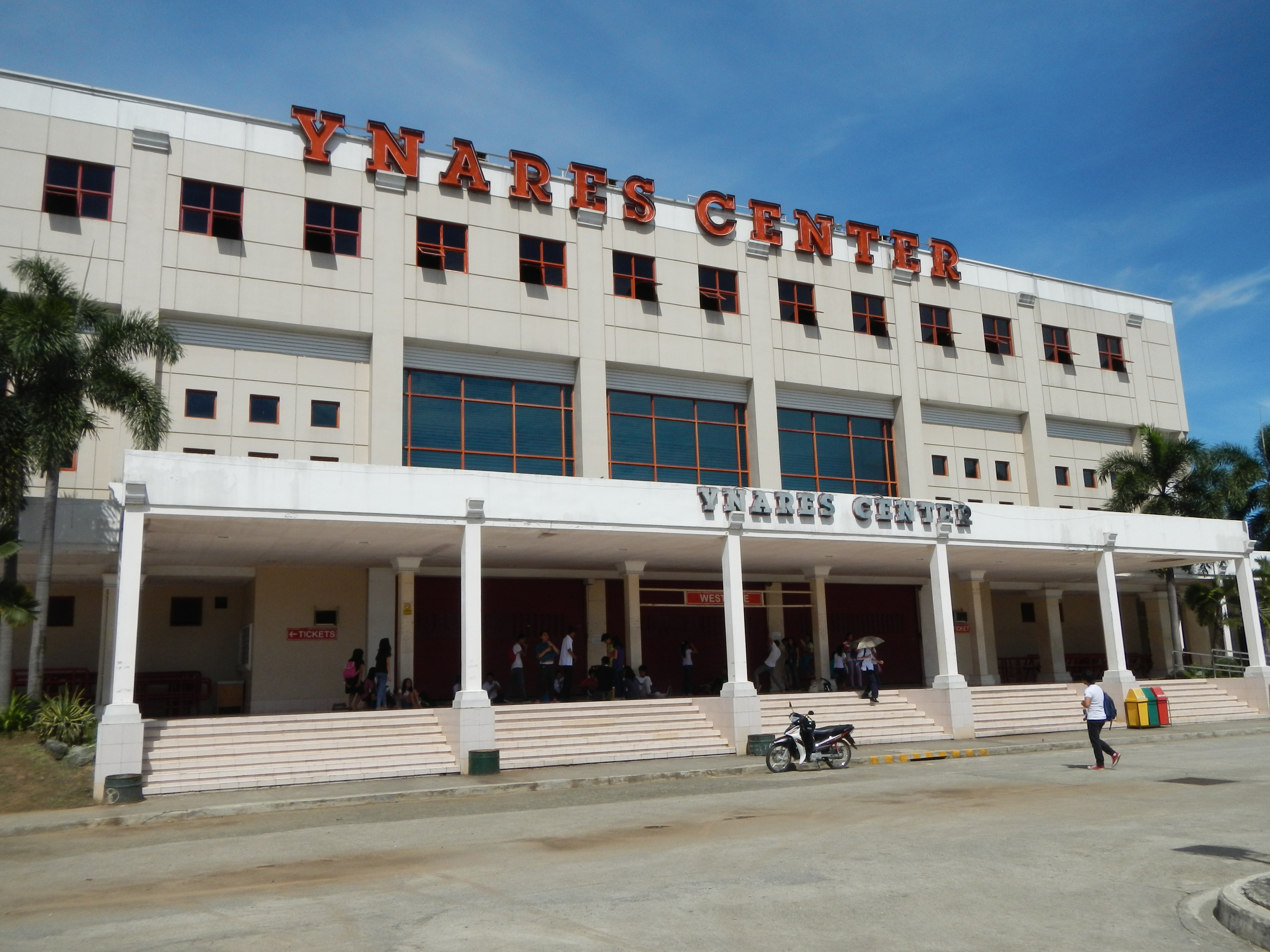
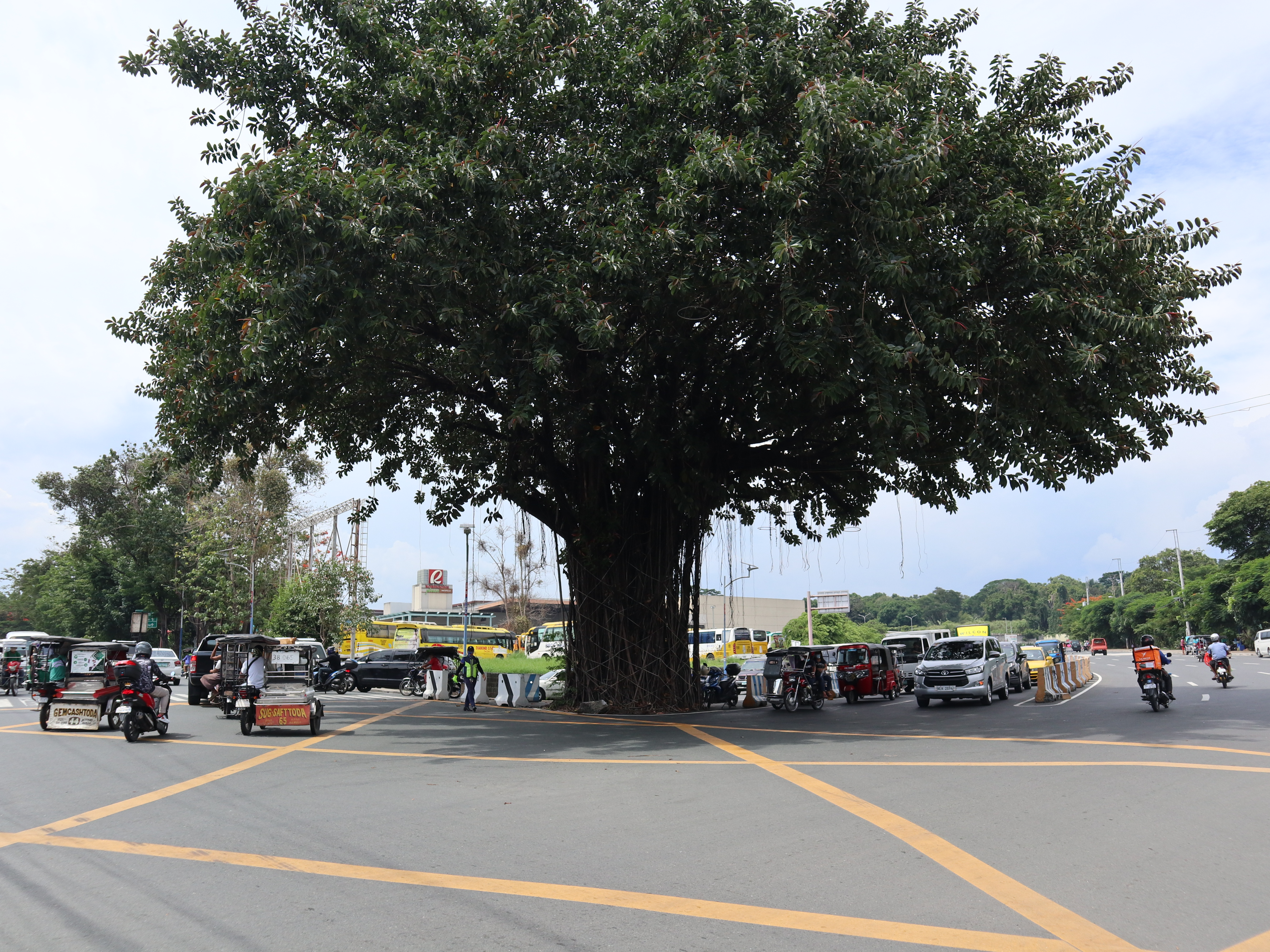
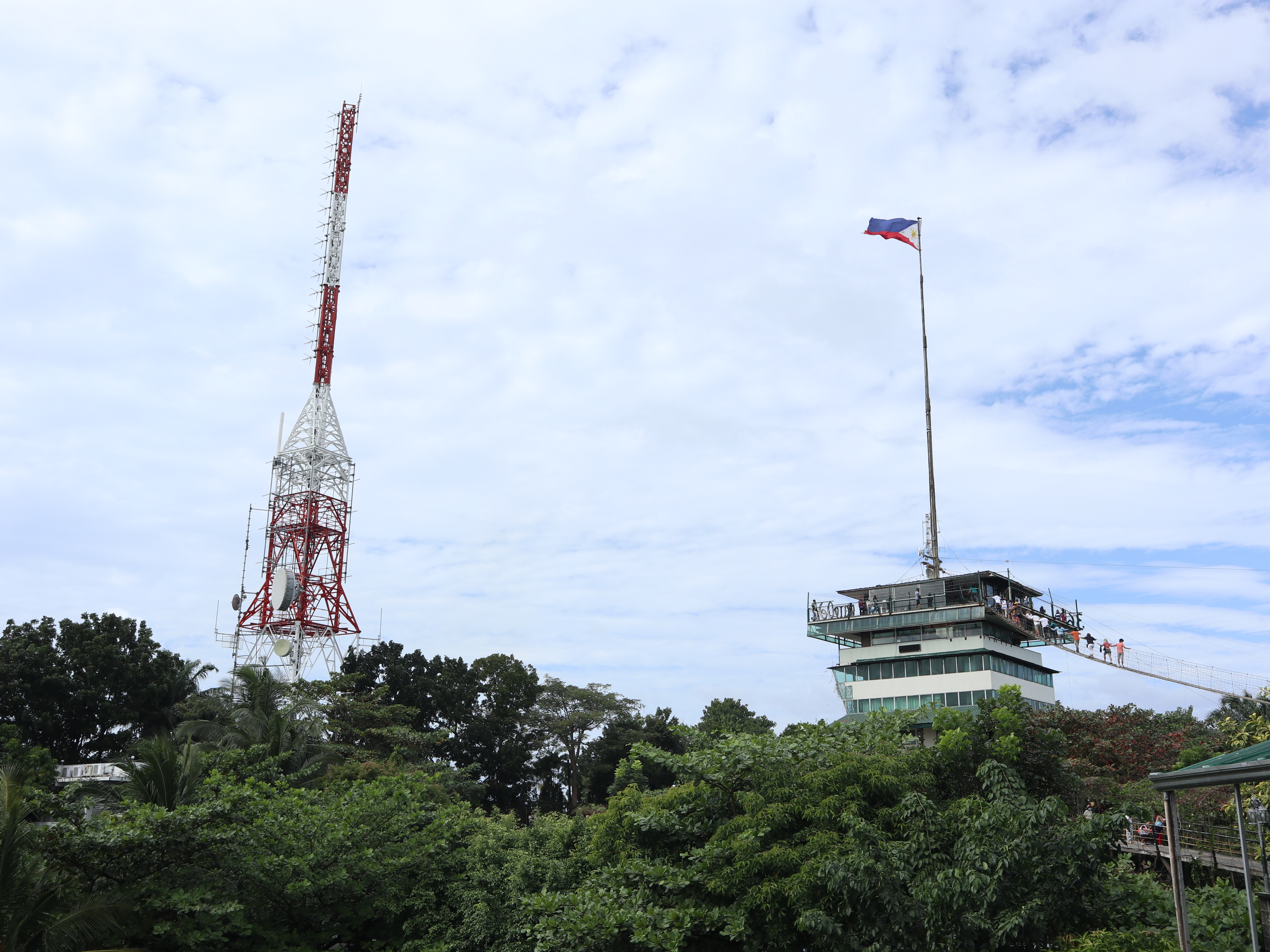
- Antipolo City proper with Antipolo Cathedral in the background Hinulugang Taktak Antipolo City Hall Rizal Provincial Capitol Ynares Center Old Rubber Tree Cloud 9

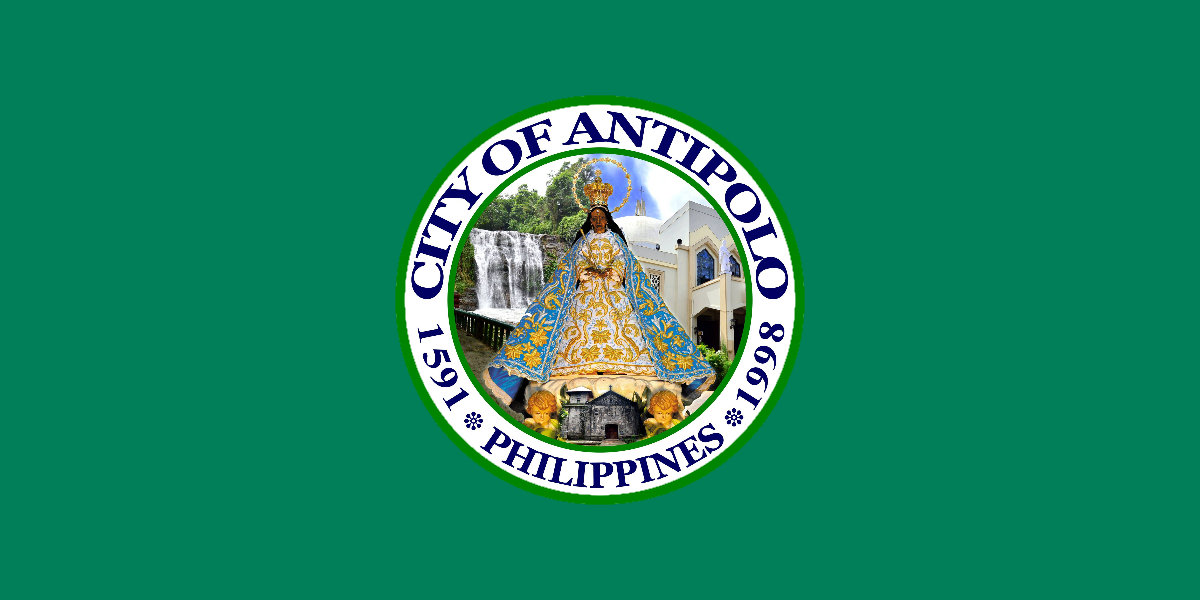
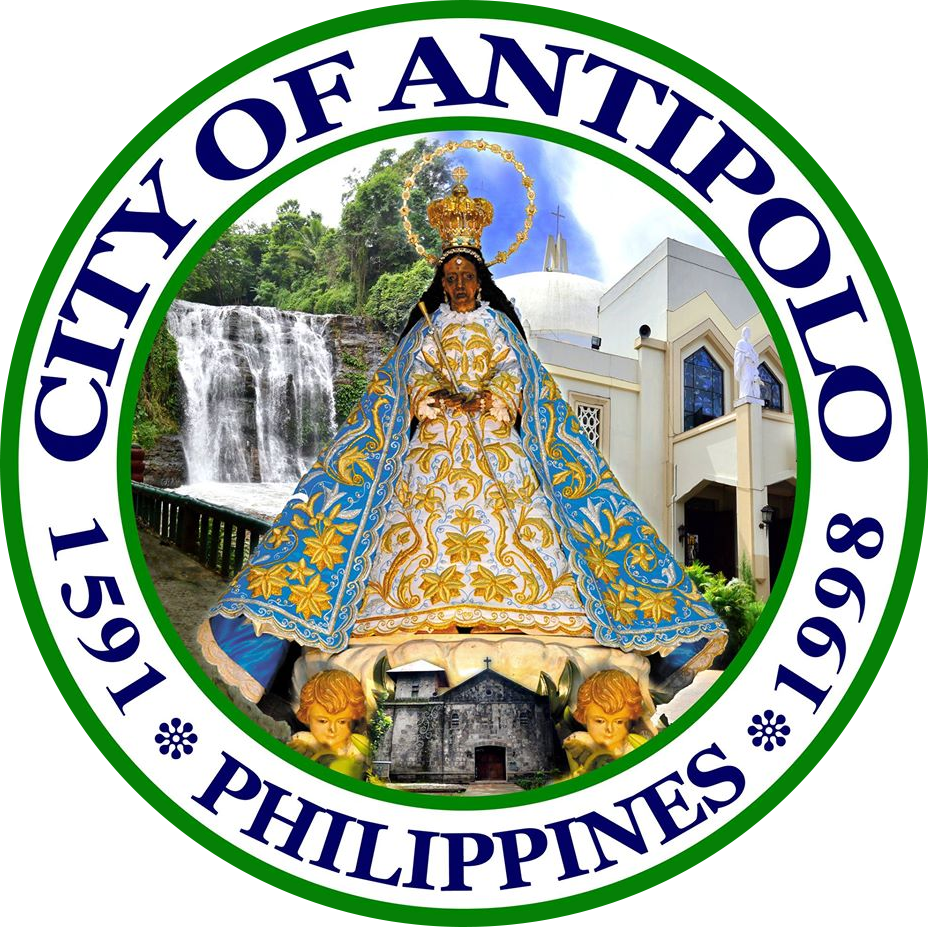
- Flag Seal
- Nicknames: Pilgrimage Capital of the Philippines; City in the Sky
- Motto: (Filipino: Tayo na sa Antipolo!) (English: "Let's go to Antipolo!")
- Anthem: Hymno ng Antipolo
- Map of Rizal with Antipolo highlighted
- Interactive map of Antipolo
- Location within the Philippines
- Coordinates: 14°35′03″N 121°10′35″E
- Country: Philippines
- Region: Calabarzon
- Province: Rizal
- District: 1st and 2nd district
- Founded: 1591
- Chartered: 1650
- Cityhood: April 4, 1998
- Barangays: 16 (see Barangays)

Government
  - Type: Sangguniang Panlungsod
  - Mayor: Casimiro A. Ynares III (NPC)
  - Vice Mayor: Roberto Andres R. Puno Jr. (NUP)
  - Representative: First District - Ronaldo V. Puno (NUP); Second District - Philip "Bong" Acop (NUP)
  - City Council: Members: 1st District; Robert R. Altamirano Sr.; Jewel Anne G. Camacho; Enrico C. De Guzman; Juan Ponciano T. Lawis; Agnes G. Oldan-Gratil; John Robin G. Say; Charmaine Jill C. Tapales; Lemuel Marlowe G. Zapanta; 2nd District; Christian Edward O. Alarcon; Josefina A. Garcia; James G. Gatlabayan; John Michael S. Leyva; Ronaldo L. Leyva; Christian A. Masangkay; Lorenzo Juan Y. Sumulong III; Irvin Paulo C. Tapales
  - Electorate: 455,797 voters (2025)

Area
  - Total: 306.10 km^{2} (118.19 sq mi)
- Elevation: 137 m (449 ft)
- Highest elevation: 1,336 m (4,383 ft)
- Lowest elevation: 1 m (3.3 ft)

Population (2024 census)
  - Total: 913,712
  - Rank: 7th
  - Density: 2,985.0/km^{2} (7,731.1/sq mi)
  - Households: 208,324

Economy
  - Income class: 1st city income class
  - Poverty incidence: 7.68% (2023)
  - Revenue: ₱ 5,694 million (2024)
  - Assets: ₱ 22,690 million (2024)
  - Expenditure: ₱ 2,833 million (2024)
  - Liabilities: ₱ 6,352 million (2024)

Service provider
  - Electricity: Manila Electric Company
  - Water: Manila Water
- Time zone: UTC+8 (PST)
- ZIP code: 1870, 1871 (Mayamot), 1872 (Bagong Nayon/Cogeo), 1873 (Cupang), 1874 (Langhaya), 1875 (Mambagat)
- PSGC: 045802000
- IDD : area code: +63 (0)2
- Native languages: Hatang Kayi (Remontado Dumagat); Tagalog
- Catholic diocese: Diocese of Antipolo
- Patron saint: Our Lady of Peace and Good Voyage
- Website: www.antipolo.ph

Antipolo, officially the City of Antipolo (Filipino: Lungsod ng Antipolo), is a component city and capital of the province of Rizal, Philippines. According to the 2024 census, it has a population of 913,712 people. It is the most populous city in Rizal and in Calabarzon region, and the seventh most-populous city in the Philippines. It is also the most populated city under the component city status.

Its higher elevation than that of Metro Manila and rest of Rizal provides vantage points overlooking the metropolitan area and surrounding parts of the province, particularly at night plus most transmitters from some FM and TV stations in Metro Manila are also located in this city, primarily broadcasting the Mega Manila area. Its locally grown mangoes and cashews are popular among tourists, as well as suman – a local delicacy made out of glutinous rice. The Hinulugang Taktak National Park, which was once a popular summer get-away is being restored to become again one of the city's primary attractions because it was devastated by a typhoon.

== Etymology ==
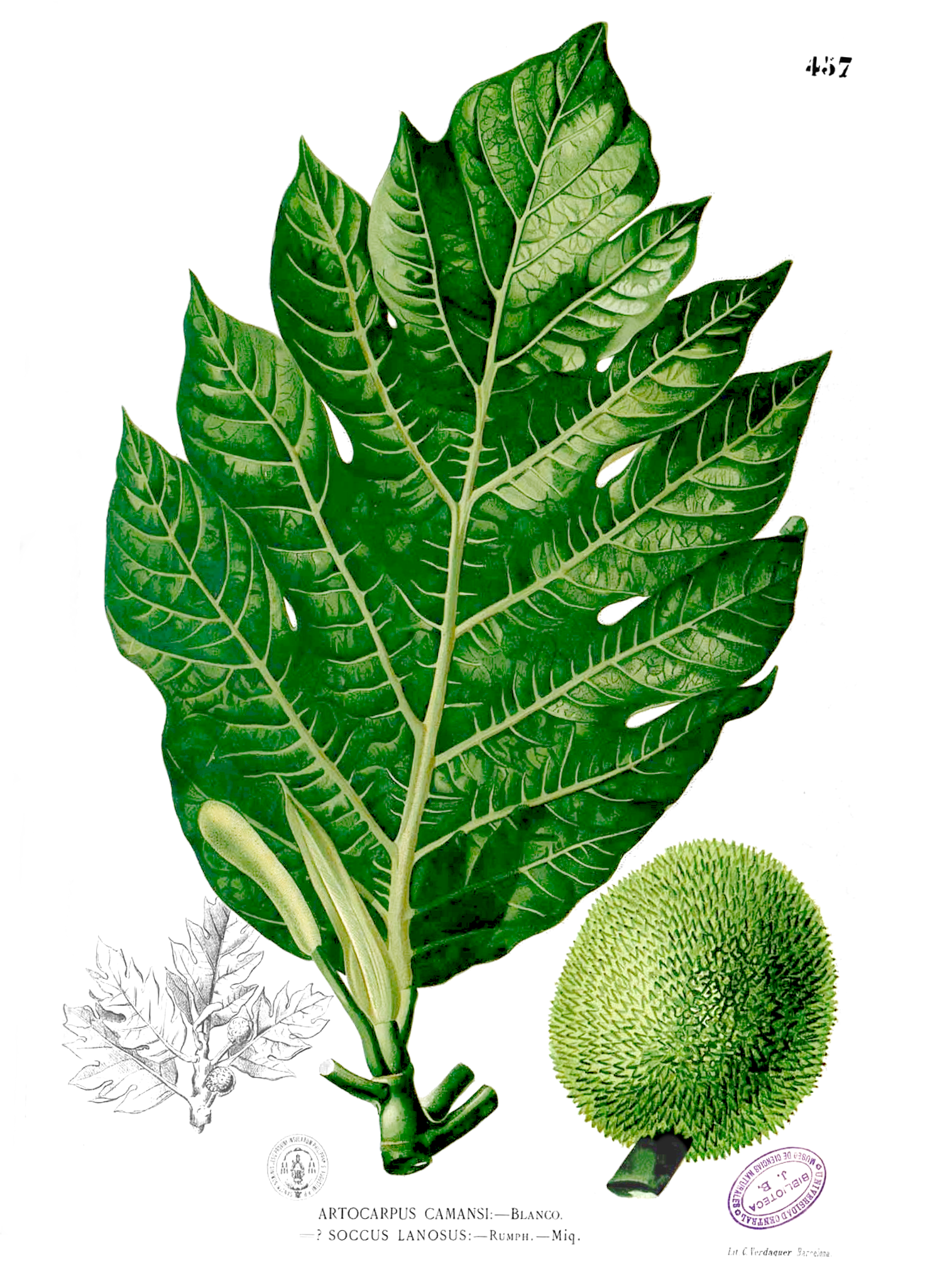
Artocarpus camansi, a close relative of the tipulo tree

The city was named after the breadfruit tree (Artocarpus blancoi) which in Tagalog is antipulo or tipulo, which was in abundance in the area. It is highly similar to the kamansi plant or Artocarpus camansi.

== History ==
=== Spanish colonial era ===
Franciscan missionaries arrived in Antipolo in 1578, and built a small church on what is now Boso-Boso Church. They were soon replaced in 1591 by the Jesuits, who organized the village into a parish. By 1601, The Christian population of Antipolo had grown to about 3,000 as the indigenous Dumagat population dwindled and moved deeper into the interiors.

An uprising of Manila's Chinese residents reached Antipolo in 1602. It led to the razing of the church.

On March 25, 1626, the image now known as the Virgin of Antipolo was brought from Acapulco, New Spain (now Mexico) by Governor-General Juan Niño de Tabora, who relinquished the image to the Jesuits for Antipolo's church.

In 1650, the village was organized into a town and became part of Tondo Province. When the province was divided in 1853, Antipolo became a part of the District of San Mateo de los Montes, which later became the District of Morong.

Later in the 1700s, discharged soldiers and deserters (from Mexico, Spain and Peru) were providing Indios military training for the weapons that had been disseminated all over the territory during the British Occupation of Manila as they disperesed across the provinces surrounding Manila, including Antipolo, Rizal.

The Recollects took over Antipolo in 1864. It was during these years that the Virgin of Antipolo gained a following of devotees. Devotees from Manila and nearby towns and provinces flocked to Antipolo on foot, carrying hammocks, trekking along mountain trails and springs.

=== American colonial period ===
During the First Republic, the town served as the capital of Morong, until it was occupied by the United States on June 4, 1899 during the Philippine-American War; the Revolutionary Government then transferred Morong's capital to Tanay. Soon after, the Americans established a civil government in 1901, Valentin Sumulong became the first municipal president. On June 11, 1901, Antipolo was incorporated into the newly established Province of Rizal, which included towns of Morong District and Manila Province. In 1903, the nearby towns of Bosoboso and Teresa were merged with Antipolo. The town's territory was expanded again in 1913 to add the sitios of Mayamot and Bulao; just to lose Teresa six years later to become an independent municipality. The Manila Railroad Company (currently Philippine National Railways) inaugurated a railway service to Antipolo on December 24, 1908.

Long before the LRT Line 2 finally opened its services in Santolan in the Pasig-Marikina border in 2004, steam train services had once served those places in the past, even before World War II.

In Marikina, there is a street named "Daangbakal", also called by the names of "Shoe Avenue Extension", "Munding Avenue" and "Bagong Silang". There is also a similar "Daangbakal" in the San Mateo-Montalban (Rodriguez) area, and on the maps one can notice that the two roads should have been connected with each other. In fact, as the name suggests in Tagalog, these streets were once a single railway line. The two sides of the "Daangbakal" roads were once connected by a bridge in the San Mateo-Marikina border. However, as the railroad tracks have been largely ignored after the Japanese occupation and was transformed into separate highways, the railway connection was abandoned.

The old railroad tracks, called the Marikina Line, were connected from Tutuban station in Manila, passing through Tramo (Barangay Rosario, Pasig) coming all the way to the town of Marikina up to Montalban. On the northern end of the "Daangbakal" road in Montalban is a basketball court. The basketball court, situated between the Montalban Catholic Church and Cemetery, occupies the former site of the railway line's terminus station.

The present-day Santo Niño Elementary School in Marikina was said to be a train depot. And also, it was said that a railroad station once stood in the Marikina City Sports Park.

The Marikina Line was completed in 1906, and continued its operation until 1936. It was said that the Japanese Imperial Army made use of this railway line during the Second World War. These railways were dismantled during the 1960s and were converted into ordinary roads.

Today, the citizens are dependent on tricycles, jeepneys, taxis, UV Express services, buses and AUVs, which contribute to the everyday traffic of Metropolitan Manila. Even now there is uncertainty concerning the Northrail project, which is to link Manila to the northern provinces of Luzon, owing to corruption within the project's construction.

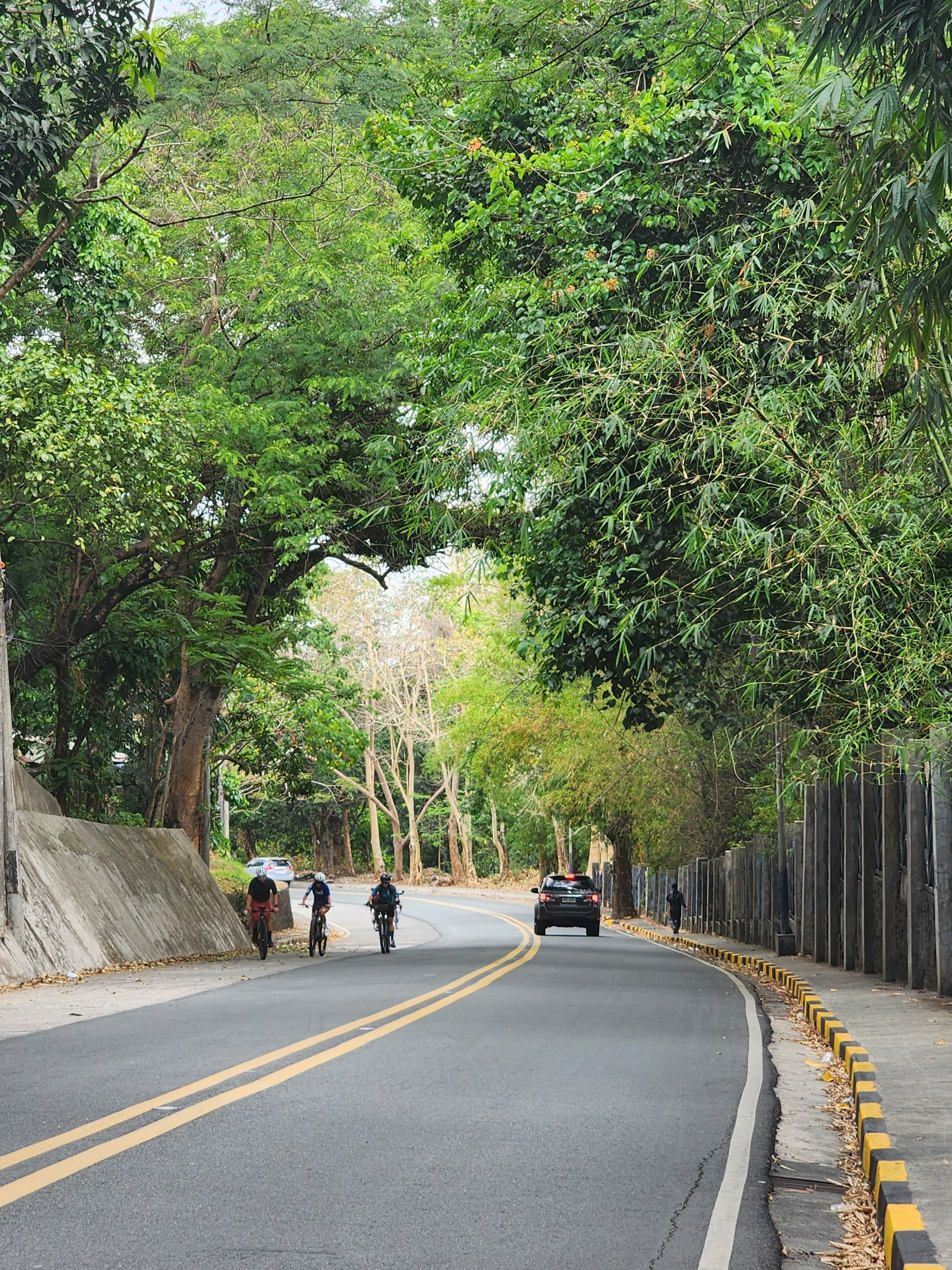
Daangbakal Road, interchangeably Taktak Road. The Remains of the terminus of the former railway line is situated near the Hinulugang Taktak falls.

Aside from the Marikina Line, two other lines have existed before but are now removed permanently. These are the Cavite Line, which passed through Paco, Parañaque, Bacoor and up to Naic, Cavite. Completed in 1908, its operation continued until 1936. The other is the Antipolo Line, which passed through Santa Mesa, Mandaluyong, Pasig, Cainta, Taytay, up to Antipolo near the "Hinulugang Taktak" Falls. Its operation ceased in 1917. There is a street named "Daangbakal" in Antipolo; there, as with the "Daangbakal" roads on Marikina and San Mateo, a railway line once existed. The railroad tracks also extended along what is now the Ortigas Avenue Extension.

=== Japanese occupation era ===
During the start of the Second World War in the Philippines, Antipolo became a refugee destination for many citizens from Manila and its suburbs who sought to avoid the Japanese invasion force about to occupy the capital. Also, two guerrilla units operated in the town against the Japanese. They were the Hunters ROTC under Miguel Ver and Terry Adevoso and the Marking Filipino and American Troops, which were established and led by Marcos Villa Agustin, more popularly known under the name Brig. Gen. Agustin Marking. Many inhabitants were tortured and killed by the Japanese, including Mayor Pascual Oliveros and his son Reynaldo, Padre Eusebio Carreon, Padre Ariston Ocampo, Sis. Ma. Elizabeth Cagulanas, RVM, Sis. Ma. Consuelo Recio, RVM; Ambrosio Masangkay, Alfonso Oliveros and Atty. Francisco C. Gedang Sr.

The liberation of Antipolo from the Japanese forces was bloody and devastating. On February 17, 1945, Mambugan, Antipolo was heavily bombarded by American planes. Antipolo residents evacuated to Sitio Colaique and up to the towns of Angono, Santolan and Marikina. To protect the image from being destroyed, Procopio Angeles, then the sacristan mayor, and members of the community brought with them the Virgin of Antipolo. The bombings on March 6–7, 1945, destroyed the church, and after twelve days of battle, the combined American and Filipino soldiers under the United States Army, Philippine Commonwealth Army and Philippine Constabulary and aided the local recognized guerrillas of the Hunters ROTC and Marking's Filipino-American Troops (MFAT) liberated the town on March 12, 1945. The general headquarters of the Philippine Commonwealth Army and Philippine Constabulary was stationed in Antipolo from March 1945 to June 1946 was built today and operates during and after the war was fought the Japanese and they helping guerrillas and Allies. After the war, a temporary church was built and the Virgin of Antipolo was returned from the Quiapo Church on October 15, 1945.

=== Philippine independence ===
Religious devotees began to flock to the town, and on May 6, 1947, the first procession of the Virgin of Antipolo was held, starting at the hills of Pinagmisahan. In the following year, a national committee was formed to undertake a nationwide fund-raising campaign to rebuild the Cathedral of Antipolo.

On June 15, 1952, Hinulugang Taktak was proclaimed a National Park by President Elpidio Quirino, and on January 14, 1954, the Bishops of the Philippines proclaimed the Antipolo Church as the national shrine of the Virgin of Antipolo. In May 1960, vice mayor Maximo Gatlabayan and police chief Pio Tolentino were sentenced by Judge Cecilia Muñoz-Palma to 30 days in jail for refusing to follow a court order not to collect any fees from motorists making a pilgrimage to Our Lady of Peace and Good Voyage.

In the 1960s, the town proper (poblacion) was widened and the Sumulong Highway was constructed. On September 12, 1969, Philippine Air Lines Flight 158 was flying from Cebu to Manila when it crashed into a hill at 760 feet in Sitio Colaique (or Kolaike) within Barrio San Roque, killing 45 of the 47 people on board. It was the worst aviation disaster in the Philippines at the time.

In the 1990s, the Marikina–Infanta Road, better known as the Marcos Highway, was constructed, traversing the mountains of Antipolo.

The Roman Catholic Diocese of Antipolo was created on June 25, 1983, with Rev. Protacio G. Gungon, D.D. as the first bishop of the diocese.

=== Provincial capital ===
On March 4, 2009, a new capitol building was inaugurated in the city to replace the old capitol in Pasig.

On June 19, 2020, President Rodrigo Duterte signed Republic Act No. 11475, designating Antipolo City as the official capital of Rizal province, replacing Pasig that held the title since the province's creation in 1901 even after its incorporation to Metro Manila in 1975. It took effect on July 7, 2020.

=== Cityhood ===
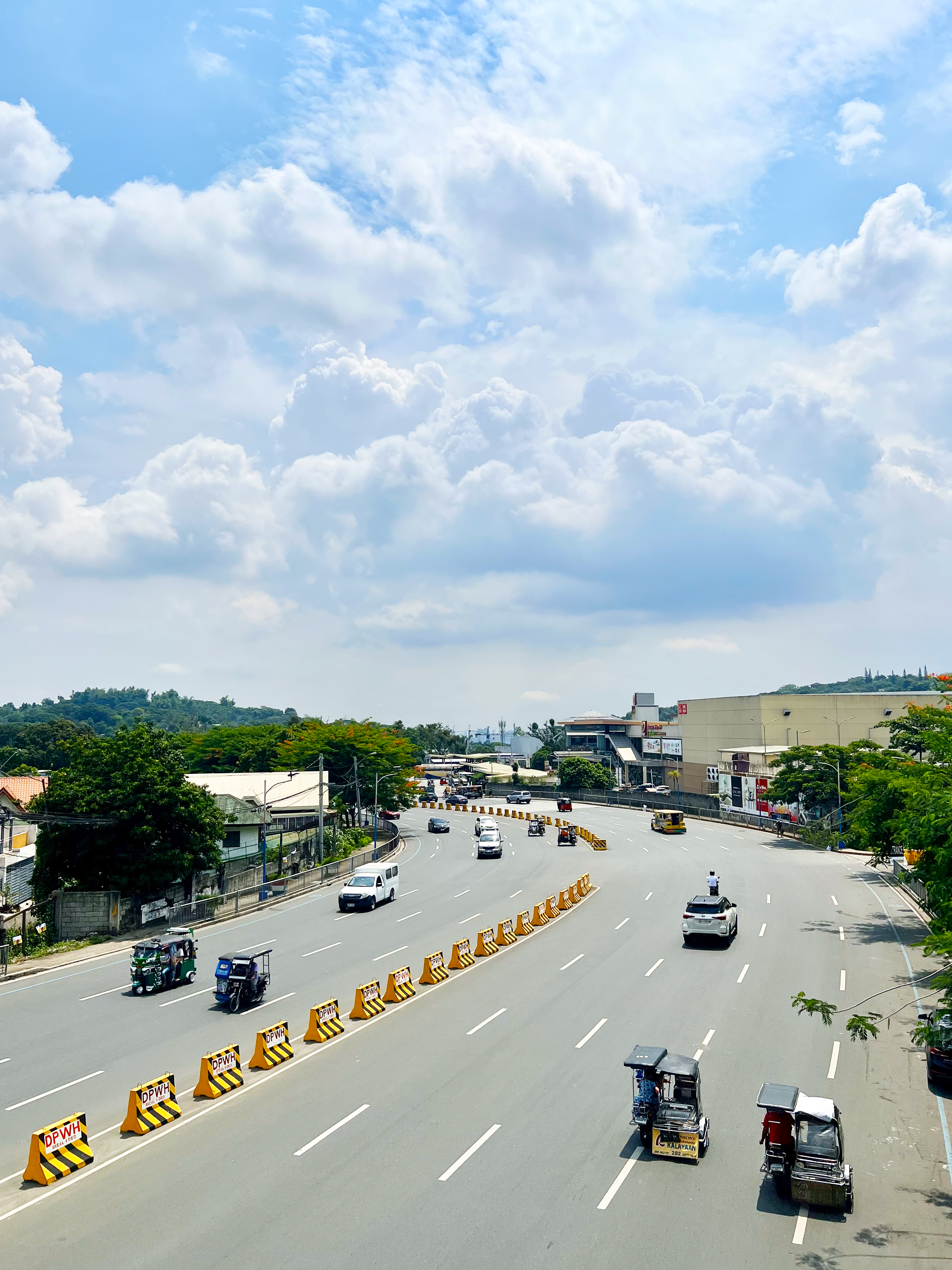
Sen. L. Sumulong Memorial Circle, also known as Circumferential Road

On February 13, 1998, Republic Act No. 8508 was enacted, Antipolo was converted from a municipality into a component city of Rizal Province on April 4, 1998.

==== Highly urbanized city ====
On March 14, 2011, then-President Benigno Aquino III declared the city as a highly-urbanized city by virtue of Proclamation No. 124, series of 2011. However, the proclamation has yet to be ratified in a plebiscite.

== Geography ==
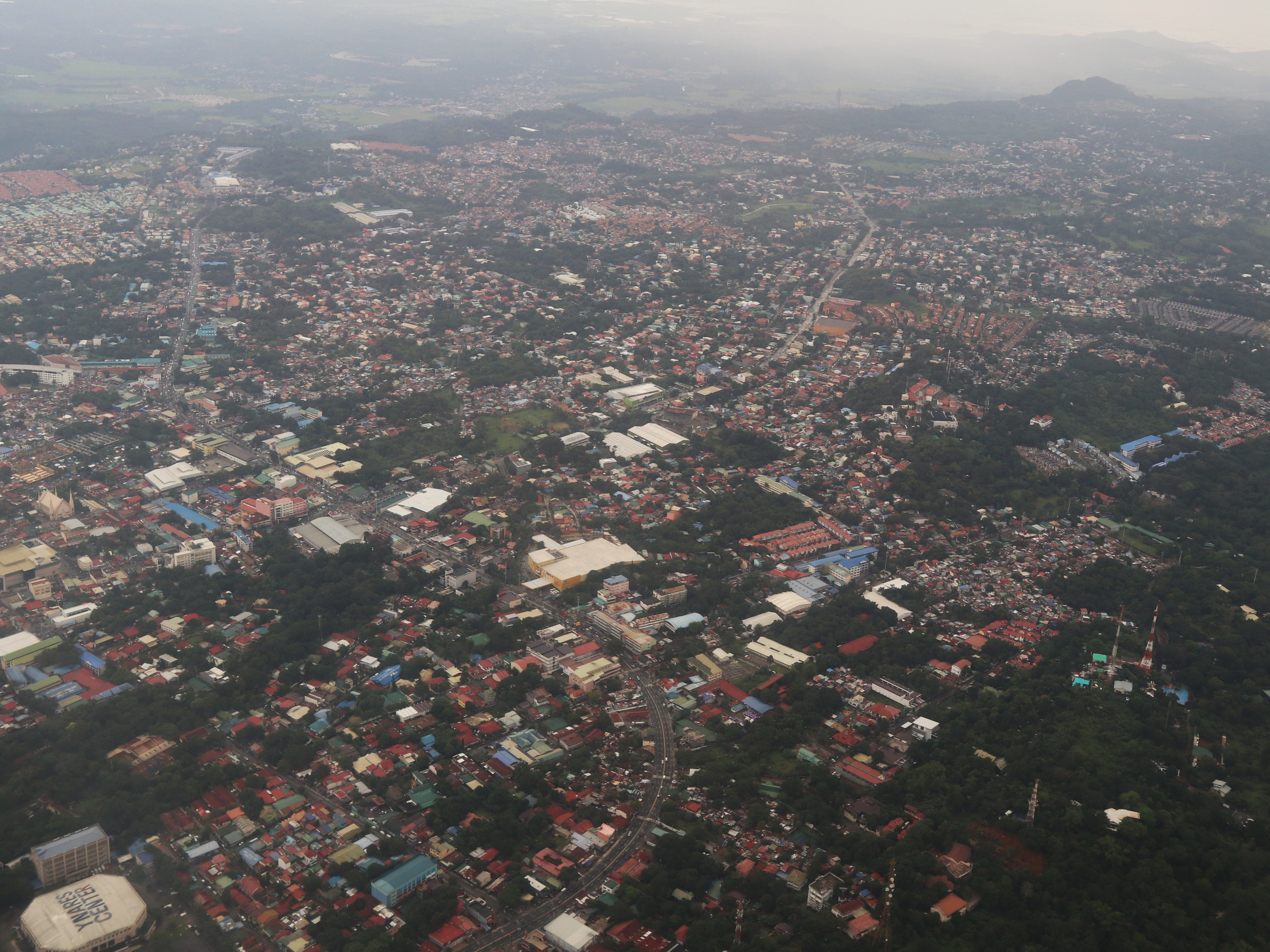
Aerial view of western Antipolo

Antipolo is in the northern half of Rizal Province, close to its meridional center. It is located on the slopes of the Sierra Madre Mountain Range. Much of the city sits on a plateau averaging 200 meters (660 ft). It has the second-largest city area in the province, with an area of 156.68 km^{2} (60.49 sq mi). The northern and southern sections of the city are in the dense forest areas of the Sierra Madre.

Antipolo is landlocked; it is bounded to the north by San Mateo and Rodriguez, to the east by Tanay, to the south by Angono, Taytay and Teresa, and to the west by Cainta and Marikina in Metro Manila.

The Bitukang Manok of Pasig—also known as the Parian Creek—had once linked the Marikina River with the Antipolo River before the Manggahan Floodway was built in 1986. The Parian Creek was actually connected to the Sapang Bato-Buli Creek (which serves as the boundary between Pasig's barangays Dela Paz-Manggahan-Rosario-Santa Lucia and the Municipality of Cainta), the Kasibulan Creek (situated at Vista Verde, Barangay San Isidro, Cainta), the Palanas Creek (leaving Antipolo through Barangay Muntindilao), the Bulaw Creek (on Barangay Mambungan, besides the Valley Golf and Country Club), and the "Hinulugang Taktak" Falls of Barangay Dela Paz (fed by the Taktak Creek passing close to the Antipolo town square), thus being the detached and long-abandoned Antipolo River.

From the early 17th century up to the period of Japanese imperialism, over a thousand Catholic devotees coming from "Maynilad" (Manila), "Hacienda Pineda" (Pasay), "San Juan del Monte", "Hacienda de Mandaloyon" (Mandaluyong), "Hacienda Mariquina" (Marikina), "Barrio Pateros", "Pueblo de Tagig" (Taguig), and "San Pedro de Macati" (Makati), followed the trail of the Parian Creek to the Pilgrimage Cathedral on the mountainous pueblo of Antipolo, Morong (the present-day Rizal Province).

The Antipoleños and several locals from the far-reached barrios of "Poblacion de San Mateo", "Montalban" (Rodriguez), "Monte de Tan-ay" (Tanay), "Santa Rosa-Oroquieta" (Teresa), and "Punta Ibayo" (Baras), had also navigated this freshwater creek once to go down to the vast "Kapatagan" (Rice plains) of lowland Pasig. Even the marian processions of the Our Lady of Peace and Good Voyage passed this route back and forth eleven times.

The creek was also used during the British occupation of Manila from 1762 to 1764 by the British Army, under the leadership of General William Draper and Vice Admiral Sir Samuel Cornish, 1st Baronet, to transport their troops upstream to take over the nearby forest-surrounded villages of Cainta and Taytay. They even did an ambush at the "Plaza Central" in front of the Pasig Cathedral, and turned the Roman Catholic parish into their military headquarters, with the church's fortress-like "campanilla" (belfry) serving as a watchtower against Spanish defenders sailing from the walled city of Manila via the Pasig River.

The Sepoys turned against their British lieutenants and sided with the combined forces of the Spanish overseas officials (assigned by the Governor-General Simon de Anda y Salazar), Filipino rice farmers, fisherfolk, and Chinese traders.

=== Climate ===
Climate data for Antipolo City, Rizal
Month	Jan	Feb	Mar	Apr	May	Jun	Jul	Aug	Sep	Oct	Nov	Dec	Year
Mean daily maximum °C (°F)	29 (84)	30 (86)	32 (90)	34 (93)	33 (91)	31 (88)	30 (86)	29 (84)	29 (84)	30 (86)	30 (86)	29 (84)	31 (87)
Mean daily minimum °C (°F)	20 (68)	20 (68)	21 (70)	23 (73)	24 (75)	25 (77)	24 (75)	24 (75)	24 (75)	23 (73)	22 (72)	21 (70)	23 (73)
Average precipitation mm (inches)	7 (0.3)	7 (0.3)	9 (0.4)	21 (0.8)	101 (4.0)	152 (6.0)	188 (7.4)	170 (6.7)	159 (6.3)	115 (4.5)	47 (1.9)	29 (1.1)	1,005 (39.7)
Average rainy days	3.3	3.5	4.8	8.1	18.9	23.5	26.4	25.5	24.5	19.6	10.4	6.4	174.9
Source: Meteoblue

Antipolo enjoys a slightly cooler weather compared to nearby Metro Manila due to its altitude of 156m above sea level. However, it can be as hot during the El Niño.

=== Barangays ===
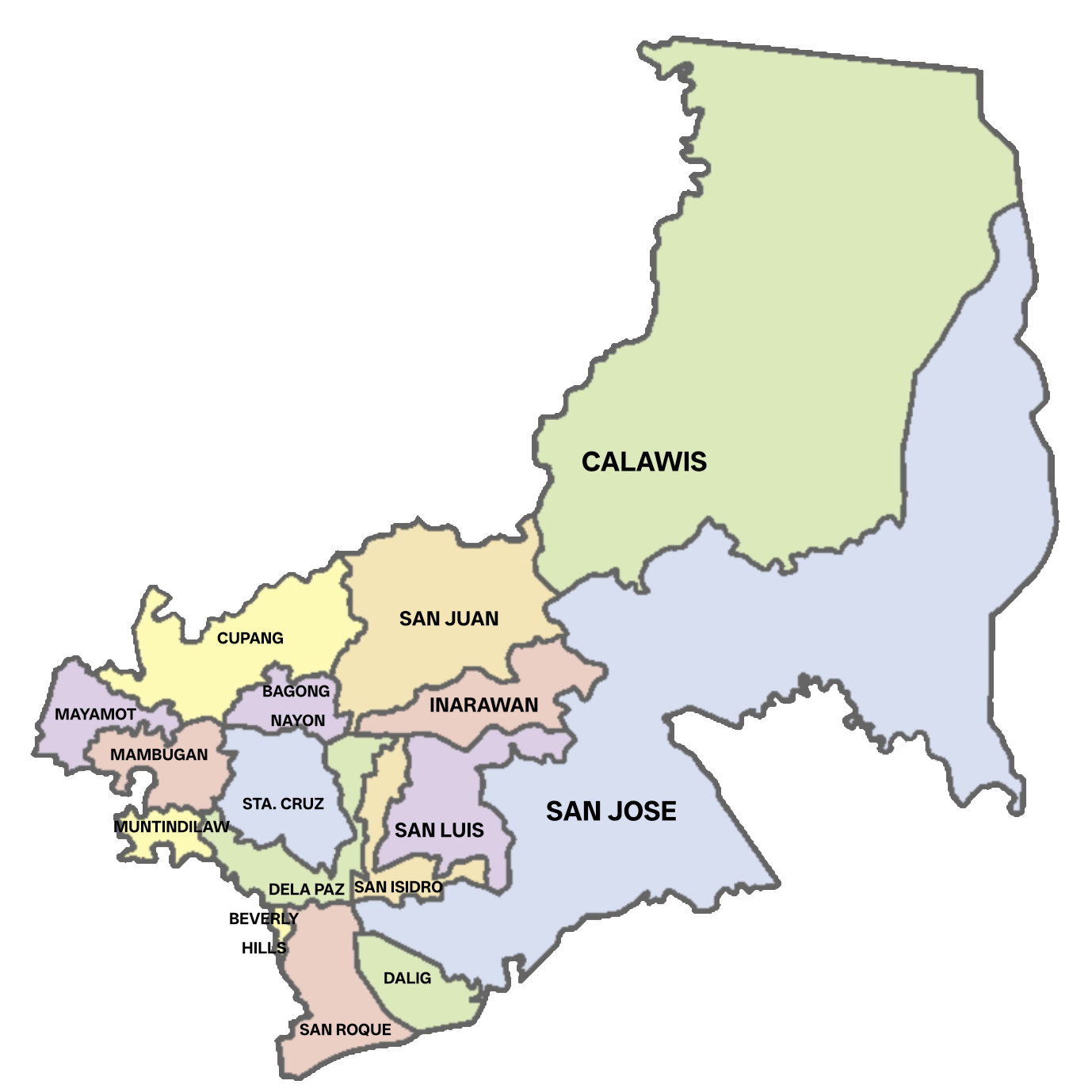
Map of Antipolo with its barangays.

Antipolo is politically subdivided into 16 barangays, as indicated in the matrix below and in the image herein. Each barangay consists of puroks and some have sitios.

The area where the boundaries of Barangays Dela Paz, San Isidro, San Jose and San Roque meet is the city proper referred to in Tagalog as bayan.

District	Barangay	Population (2024)	Area (km^{2})	Density (/km^{2})
1st	Bagong Nayon	50,326	3.01	16,310
1st	Beverly Hills	1,069	0.29	3,760
1st	Dela Paz (Pob.)	81,538	5.98	12,910
1st	Mambugan	55,664	3.68	15,020
1st	Mayamot	53,654	5.41	9,710
1st	Muntindilaw	14,676	4.73	2,860
1st	San Isidro (Pob.)	67,433	4.80	13,650
1st	Santa Cruz	67,447	7.26	9,000
2nd	Calawis	8,935	55.81	150
2nd	Cupang	135,996	5.68	23,780
2nd	Inarawan	33,061	9.60	3,320
2nd	San Jose (Pob.)	10,441	137.79	930
2nd	San Juan	10,062	33.27	300
2nd	San Luis	66,351	5.03	13,190
2nd	San Roque	74,242	7.23	9,700
	Total	913,712	305.04	2,900

== Demographics ==
=== Population ===
Antipolo's population in the 2015 census was enumerated at 776,386 inhabitants. It grew at an annual rate of 4.19 percent from the 2000 figure. The annual population growth rate has slowed somewhat in recent years, but it remains above the annual national average of 2.04 percent. The 2007 figure was three times the population of the city in 1990. Antipolo is the most populated city in the Philippines under a component city status.

Population census of Antipolo
Year	Pop.	±% p.a.
1903	3,286	—
1918	6,076	+4.18%
1939	6,135	+0.05%
1948	7,604	+2.41%
1960	21,598	+9.09%
1970	26,508	+2.07%
1975	40,944	+9.11%
1980	68,912	+10.97%
1990	205,096	+11.53%
1995	345,512	+10.27%
2000	470,866	+6.86%
2007	633,971	+4.19%
2010	677,741	+2.46%
2015	776,386	+2.62%
2020	887,399	+2.85%
2024	913,712	+0.70%
Source: Philippine Statistics Authority

=== Languages ===
Residents of the city mainly speak Tagalog. Very minor communities of the indigenous Dumagat people can be found in Barangay Calawis and the sitios Old Boso-Boso, San Isidro, San Jose and Kaysakat in Barangay San Jose.

=== Religion ===
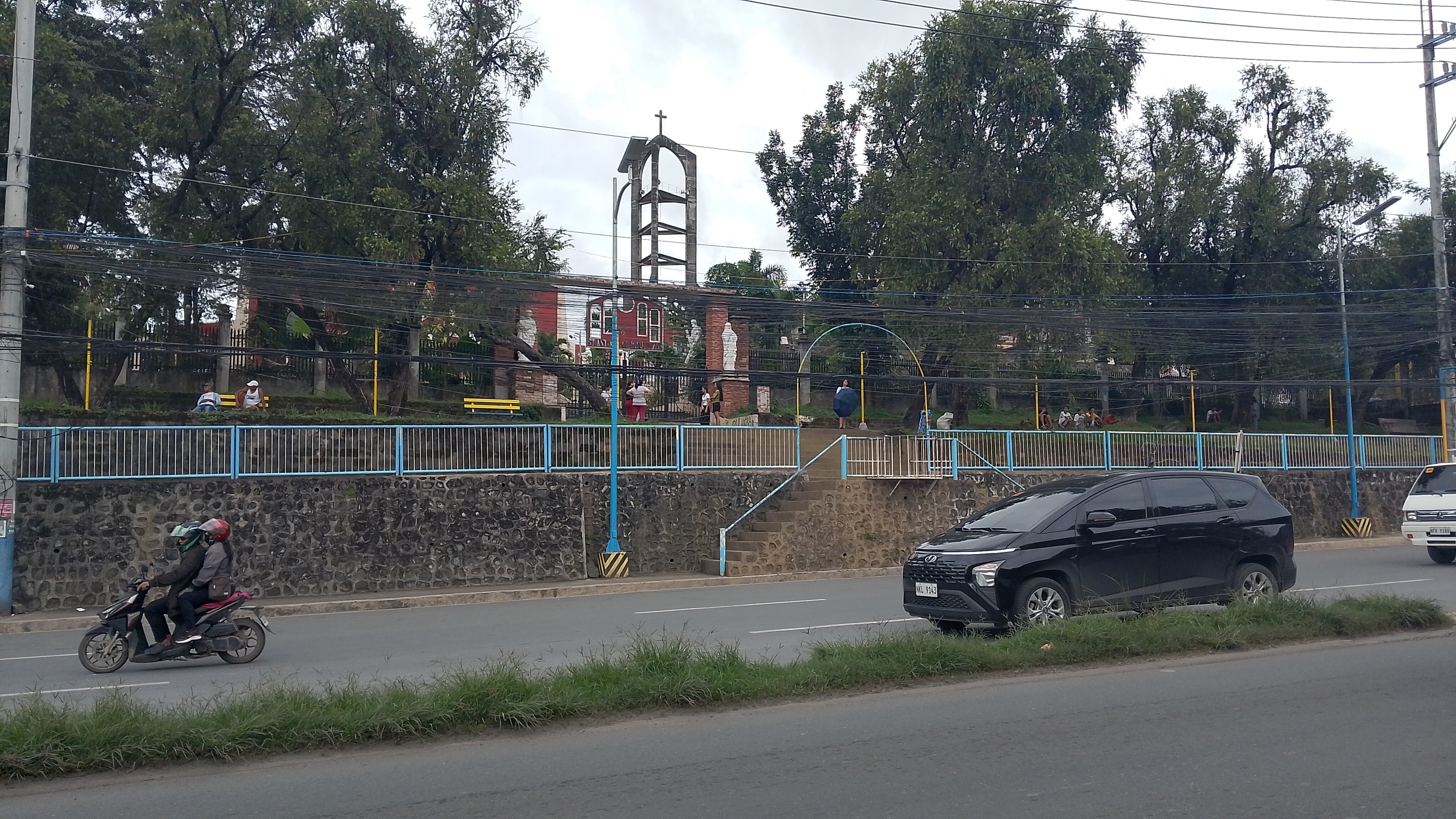
St. Anthony of Padua Parish Church in Barangay Inarawan

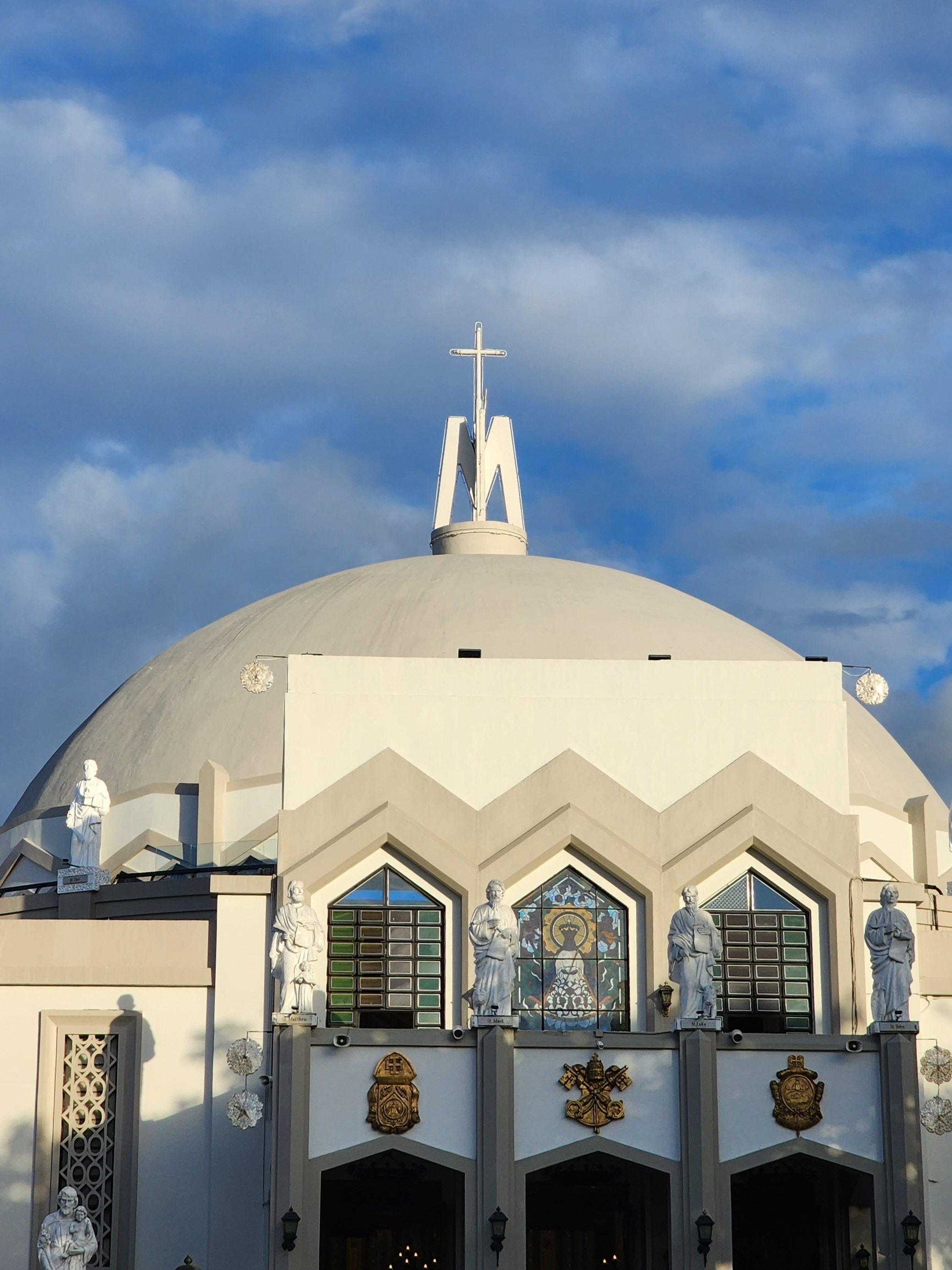
A close-up shot of the Antipolo Cathedral, declared as an international shrine

The city is popular for being a pilgrimage site. It prides itself as the "Pilgrimage Capital of the Philippines". The Marian image of the Our Lady of Peace and Good Voyage or the Virgin of Antipolo, which was brought in from Mexico in 1626, and enshrined in the Antipolo Cathedral has a continuous following among Filipino Catholics since the Spanish colonial era. A popular custom of pilgrimages to the Virgin of Antipolo is the trek going to its shrine on the eves of Good Friday and May 1, from various locations in Rizal Province and Metro Manila. The most notable of these pilgrimages would begin the trek from the Minor Basilica of the Black Nazarene (Quiapo Church), in Quiapo, Manila following the procession of the image. There is also an existing custom to have new cars blessed at the church in the belief that this will ensure the safety of the car and its passengers, and also preferred by outgoing OFWs to ensure their success abroad.

== Economy ==
Poverty incidence of Antipolo (%)

Source: Philippine Statistics Authority

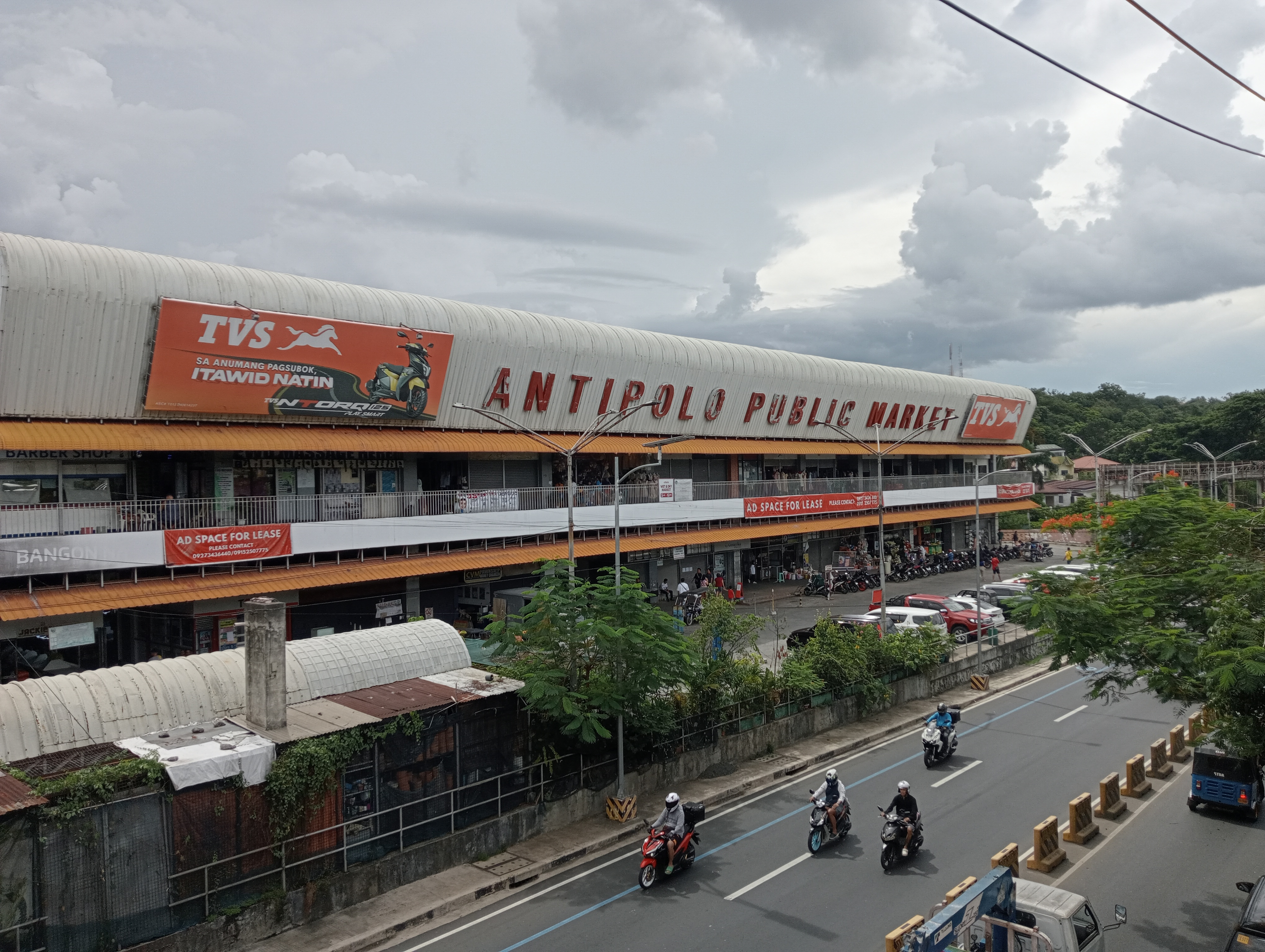
Antipolo Public Market in 2024

Antipolo is classified as a First Class City as of last local government income classification of the Department of Finance in 2008.

In 2007, the city registered a total revenue of ₱993.1 million, an increase of 5.6 percent from the previous fiscal year; in 2010 this amount has grown to ₱1.56 billion. Its proximity to Metro Manila has continuously spurred the growth of the real estate industry and by 2007, revenue from real property taxes has ballooned by 32.1 percent from 2006 to ₱146.2 million as there are also about 456 residential subdivisions in the city.

During the mid-2010s, Antipolo has experienced rapid growth mainly attributed to the local government's streamlining of business applications, improved public services, and transparency.

In the latest 2022 COA Annual Financial Report released in late-2023, Antipolo ranked as 14th richest city in the Philippines in terms of assets, surpassing Metro Manila cities Pasay, Valenzuela, and Las Piñas; and regional cities Puerto Princesa and Baguio. Removing Highly Urbanized Cities (HUCs) in the list, Antipolo stands as the 2nd richest component city in the country, trailing Laoag City by only ₱2 billion pesos in difference.

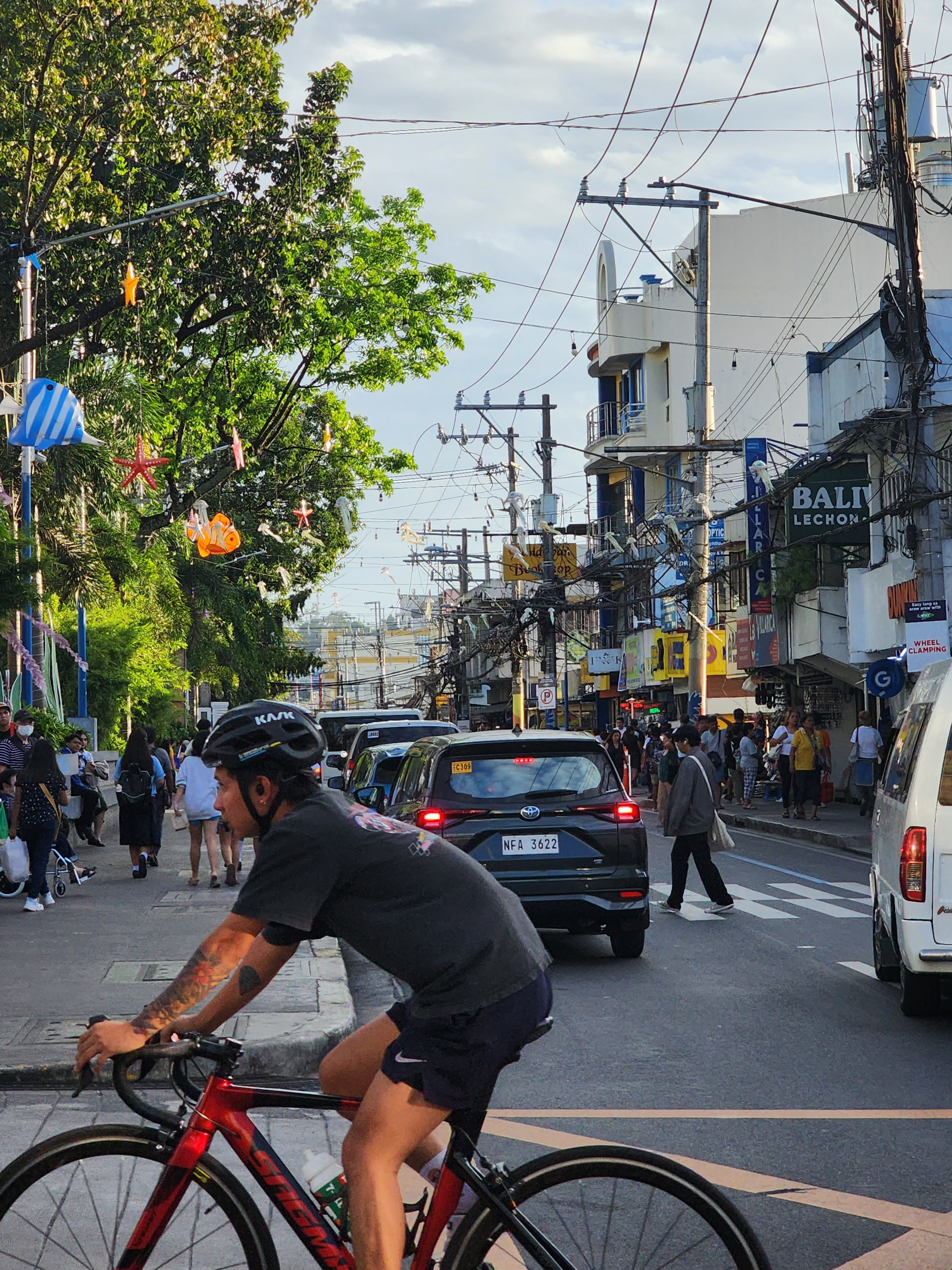
A busy M.L. Quezon Street, in uptown Antipolo

Antipolo is an economically decentralized city with major economic centers located in key areas. The city's upland poblacion area also include Robinsons Antipolo, Walter Mart, a Shopwise, iMall, Victory Park and Shop, and a Vista Mall. Meanwhile, the downtown has SM Masinag, SM Center Antipolo Downtown (formerly SM Cherry Antipolo) and a Xentro Mall. The city is also dotted with Wilcon Depot centers and an AllHome. Both the upland and downtown areas have their own wet and dry marketplaces. The upcoming Antipolo City Government Center in Cabading is also expected to spur growth near the city's geographical center.

== Government ==
=== Local government ===
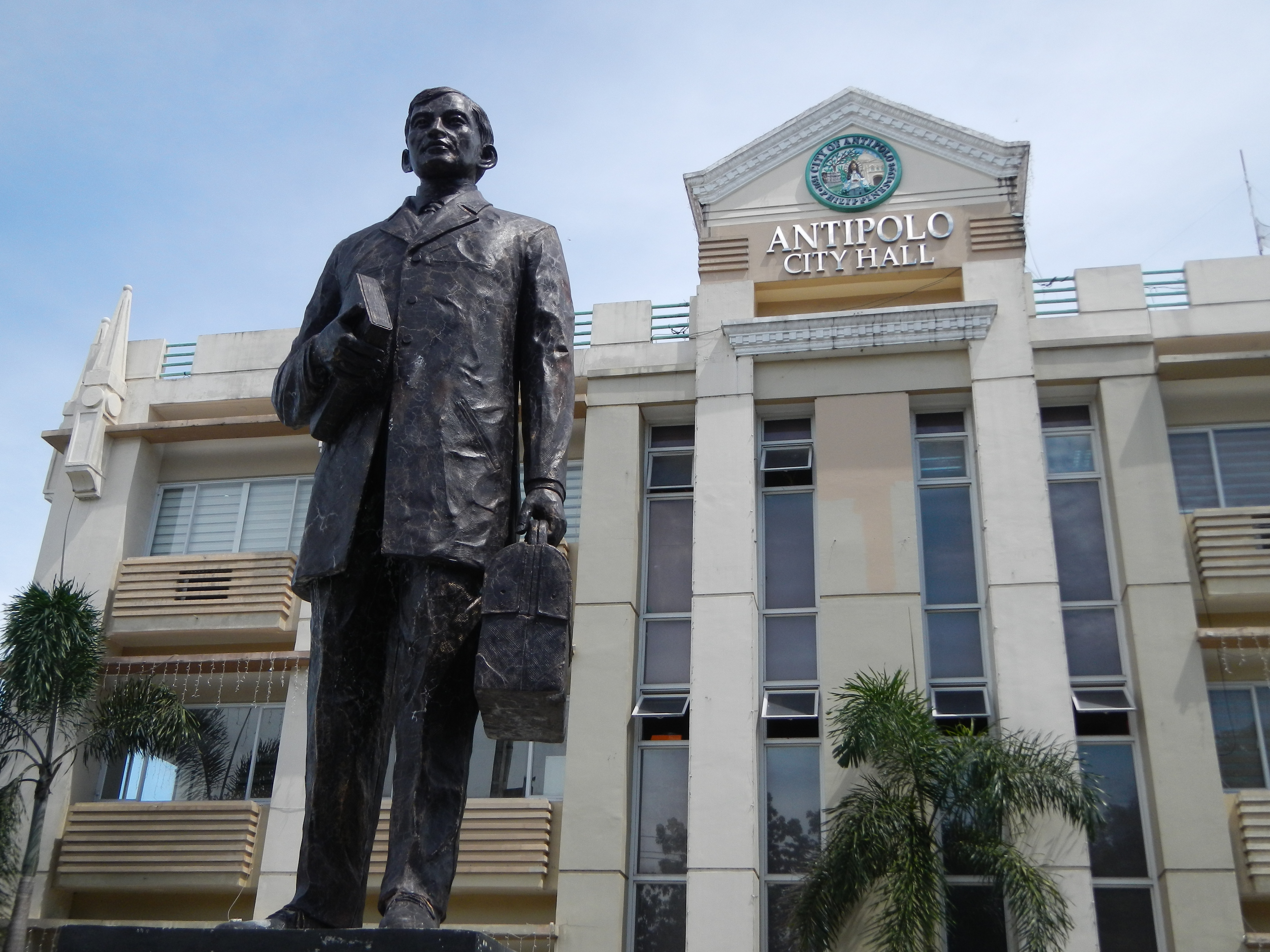
Facade of City Hall

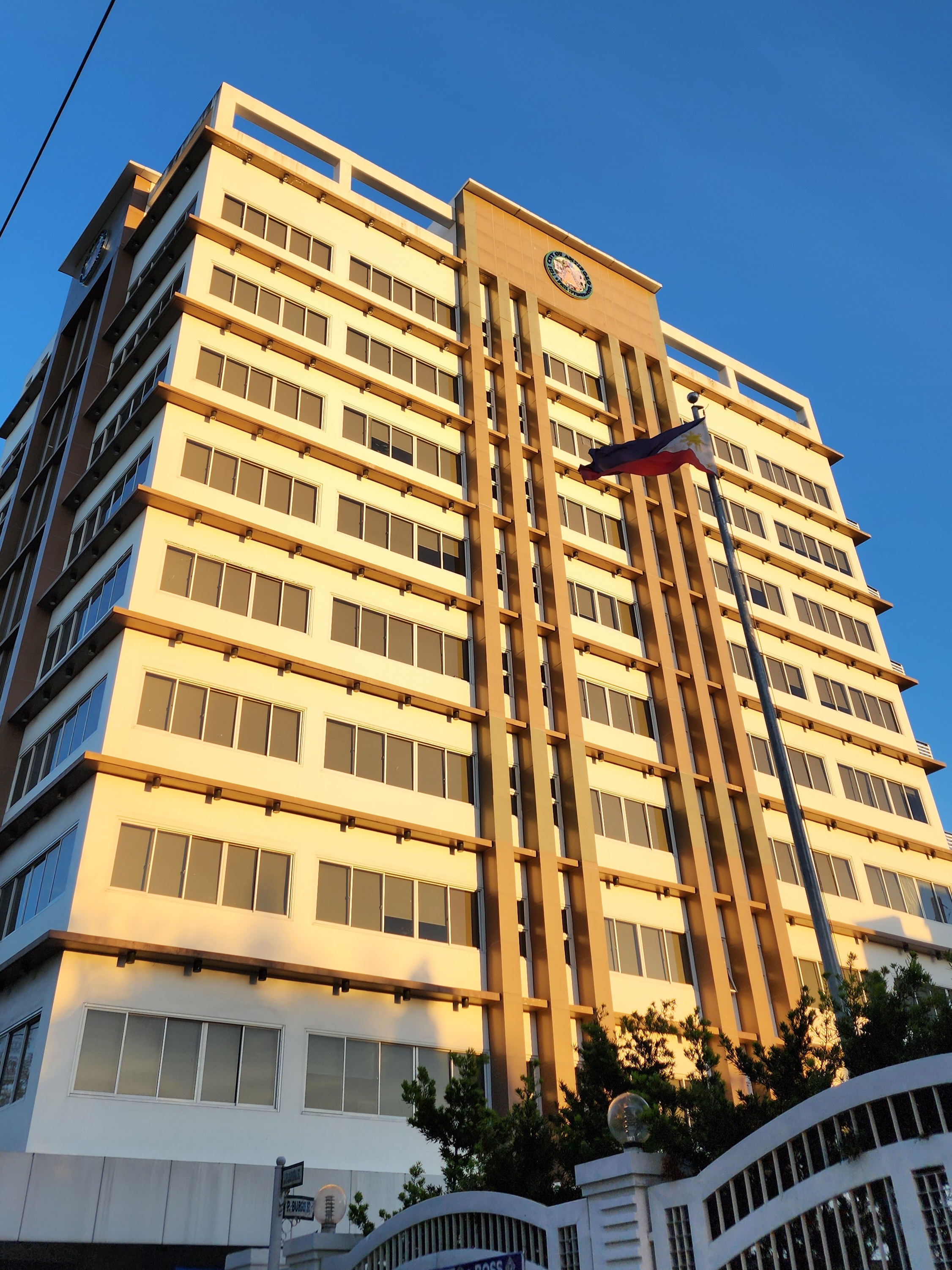
The newly-built City Hall Annex building, adjacent to the old City Hall

As a component city and the capital of the Province of Rizal, government officials in the provincial level are voted by the electorates of the city. The provincial government have political jurisdiction over local transactions of the city government.

Similar to other cities in the Philippines, the government structure of Antipolo is prescribed in the Local Government Code of 1991, and further codified in its city charter. It is headed by a city mayor, who serves as its chief executive and exercises overall supervision of its administrative agencies.

Its second-highest official, the city vice mayor, primarily serves as presiding officer of the Sangguniang Panlungsod and assumes the position of city mayor in the event of its vacancy. As presiding officer of the Sangguniang Panlungsod, the vice mayor does not vote except in cases to break a tie.

The city's Sangguniang Panlungsod or city council is composed of 16 elected members, two ex officio officers and an option to have at most three sectoral representatives. The 16 barangays Antipolo is divided into are grouped into two districts. Each of these districts elect at-large eight city councilors, while the two ex officio officers are the city's Liga ng mga Barangay president and Sangguniang Kabataan Federation president.

Apart from legislating city ordinances, it also reviews the ordinances enacted by its barangays and makes recommendations for modification if they are found to be inconsistent with existing laws and city ordinances. On the other hand, ordinances and certain resolutions of the Sangguniang Panlungsod are transmitted to the Sangguniang Panlalawigan of Rizal for compliance review.

Barangays are also headed by elected officials: Barangay Captain, Barangay Council, whose members are called Barangay Councilors. The barangays have SK federation which represents the barangay, headed by SK chairperson and whose members are called SK councilors.

Elective city officials serve a term of three years and may serve up to three consecutive terms.

=== Congress representation ===
Antipolo's barangays are grouped into two legislative districts. Each district elects eight members to its Sangguniang Panlalawigan and one each to the House of Representatives.

=== List of former chief executives ===
No.	Mayor	In office
1	Valentin Sumulong	1901–1904
2	Tranquilino Oldan	1904–1907
3	Severino Oliveros	1907–1909
4	Francisco Dimanlig	1909–1911
5	Ambrocio Masangkay	1912–1914
6	Roberto de Jesus	1914–1916
7	Federico Asuncion	1916–1918
8	Sixto Pedracio	1916–1918
9	Cornelio Lawis	1918–1920
10	Jose Carigma	1920–1926
11	Marcelino Santos	1927–1931
12	Pascual Oliveros	1931–1944
(11)	Marcelino Santos	1945–1946
13	Isaias Tapales	1946–1964
14	Francisco de Jesus	1964–1967
15	Jose R. Oliveros	1968–1986
16	Felix Mariñas	1986–1988
17	Daniel Garcia	1988–1998
18	Angelito Gatlabayan	1998–2007
19	Victor Sumulong	2007–2009
20	Danilo O. Leyble	2009–2013
21	Casimiro Ynares III	2013–2019
22	Andrea Bautista-Ynares	2019–2022
(21)	Casimiro Ynares III	2022–incumbent

== Education ==
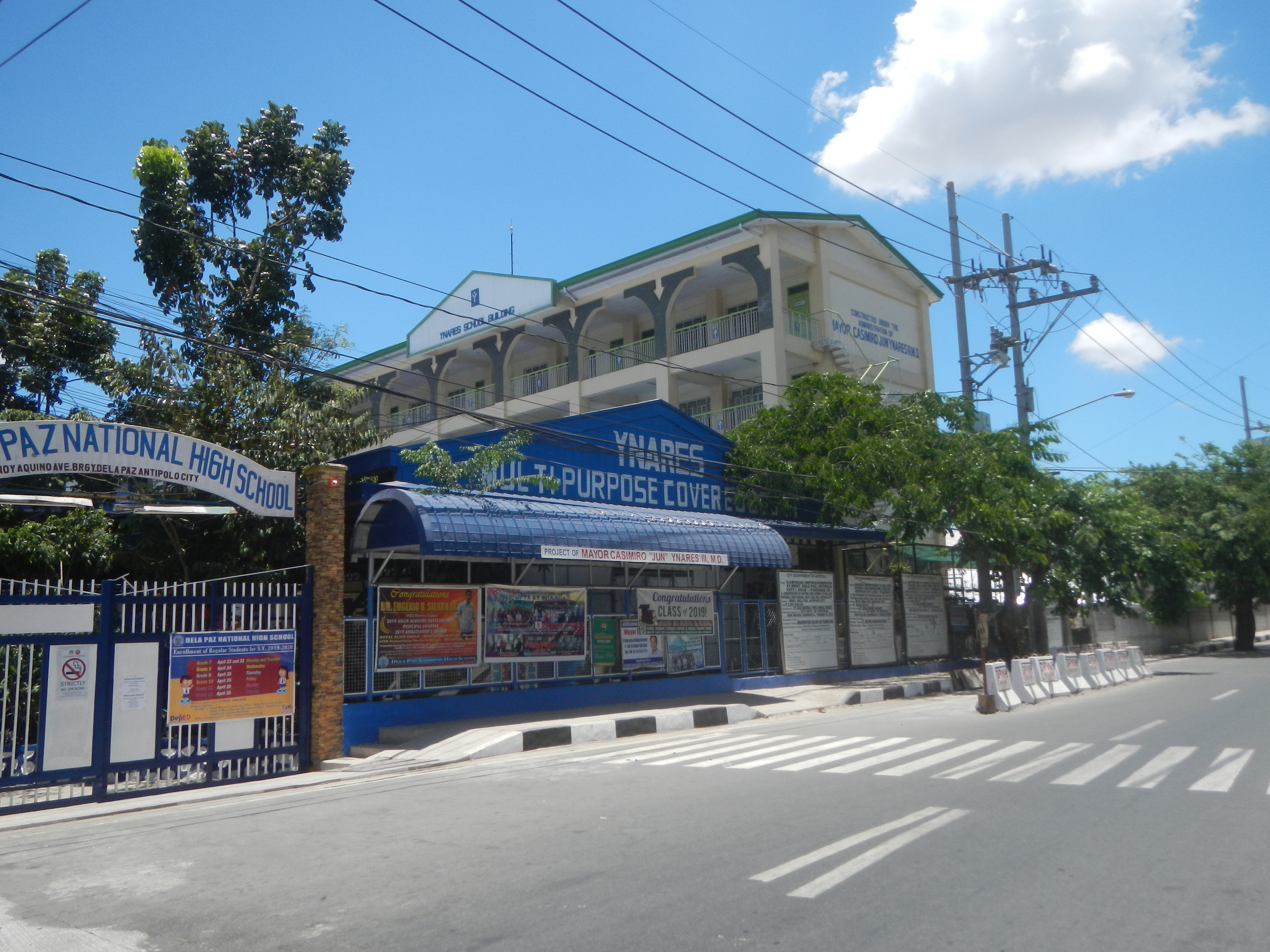
Picture of Dela Paz National High School in Antipolo City

The Department of Education City Schools Division Office of Antipolo supervises the 67 public schools (44 elementary schools, 2 integrated elementary-junior high school, 3 junior high schools, 17 integrated high schools, and 1 senior high school), in addition to 159+ accredited private schools.

There are four colleges and universities with campuses in Antipolo, the state-run University of Rizal System, La Salle College-Antipolo, De La Salle College of Saint Benilde and Our Lady of Fatima University. Antipolo is also home to an all-girls institution, Assumption Antipolo.

Other colleges include College of San Benildo - Rizal, ACLC, AMA University Computer College - East Rizal, World Citi Colleges, and ICCT Colleges.

The Antipolo Institute of Technology or AiTech, established by the city government in 2014, is the first CHED-recognized Higher Education Institution (HEI) among Local Colleges and Universities (LUCs). It is the first college in the Philippines offering Bachelor in Construction Engineering Technology and Management (BCETM).

=== Public Elementary Schools ===
- Antipolo City SPED Center - provides for children with special education needs.
- Apia Integrated School - an offshoot of Calawis National High School principally established for Aklanon-speaking migrants from the Western Visayas who have settled in the rural, hilly area of Sitio Apia in Barangay Calawis.
- Bagong Nayon I Elementary School
- Bagong Nayon II Elementary School
- Bagong Nayon IV Elementary School
- Binayoyo Integrated School
- Cabading Elementary School
- Calawis Elementary School
- Canumay Elementary School
- Cupang Elementary School
- Cupang Elementary School Annex
- Dalig Elementary School
- Dela Paz Elementary School
- Inuman Elementary School
- Isaias S. Tapales Elementary School
- Jesus S. Cabarrus Elementary School
- Juan Sumulong Elementary School
- Kaila Elementary School
- Kaysakat Elementary School
- Knights of Columbus Elementary School
- Libis Elementary School
- Lores Elementary School
- Mambugan I Elementary School
- Mambugan II Elementary School
- Mayamot Elementary School
- Muntindilaw Elementary School
- Nazarene Ville Elementary School
- Old Boso-boso Elementary School
- Paglitaw Elementary School
- Pantay Elementary School
- Peace Village Elementary School
- Peñafrancia Elementary School
- Peñafrancia Elementary School Annex
- Rizza Elementary School
- San Antonio Village Elementary School
- San Isidro Elementary School
- San Joseph Elementary School
- San Luis Elementary School
- San Ysiro Elementary School
- Sapinit Elementary School
- Sta. Cruz Elementary School
- Sumilang Elementary School
- Taguete Elementary School
- Tanza Elementary School
- Teofila Z. Rovero Memorial Elementary School
- Upper Kilingan Elementary School

=== Public Secondary Schools ===
- Antipolo National High School (Grades 7-10)
- Antipolo City Senior High School (Grades 11-12)
- Antipolo City National Science & Technology High School (Grades 7-12)
- Apia Integrated School (Kinder-Grade 10)
- Bagong Nayon II National High School (Grades 7-12)
- Binayoyo Integrated School (Kinder-Grade 10)
- Calawis National High School (Grades 7-12)
- Canumay National High School (Grades 7-12)
- Cupang National High School (Grades 7-10)
- Dalig National High School (Grades 7-12)
- Dela Paz National High School (Grades 7-12)
- Kaysakat National High School (Grades 7-12)
- Mambugan National High School (Grades 7-10)
- Marcelino M. Santos National High School (Grades 7-12)
- Maximo L. Gatlabayan Memorial National High School (Grades 7-12)
- Mayamot National High School (Grades 7-12)
- Muntindilaw National High School (Grades 7-12)
- Old Boso-boso National High School (Grades 7-12)
- Rizza National High School (Grades 7-12)
- San Isidro National High School (Grades 7-12)
- San Jose National High School (Grades 7-12)
- San Juan National High School (Grades 7-12)
- San Roque National High School (Grades 7-12)

=== Private Schools ===
- Antipolo Immaculate Concepcion School (AICS)
- Antipolo Faith Christian School
- Antipolo Lady of Lourdes School (ALLS), is a private, non-sectarian school located at the Interior National Road, Brgy. San Jose, Antipolo, for pre-school, elementary, junior high school, and senior high school students, including the General Academic Strand for upcoming Grade 11 students.
- Brighton Institute of Arts and Trade Inc. (BIATI)
- College of San Benildo - Rizal
- De La Salle - College of Saint Benilde Antipolo
- Don Antonio de Zuzuarregui Sr., Memorial Academy (DAZSMA)
- English Christian Academy
- GALMI Christian Academy
- Gateways Institute of Science and Technology (GIST) - Antipolo
- Golden Sunbeams Christian School
- Hillcrest School
- Holy Spirit Integrated School
- Harvest International School
- ICCT Colleges - Antipolo Campus
- ICCT Colleges - Cogeo Campus
- Infant Jesus Academy Antipolo (IJAA)
- La Salle College Antipolo
- Montessori Integrated School of Antipolo (MISA)
- Marcelli School of Antipolo
- Maries Christian School
- Mother Goose Montessori Grade School
- Nazareth Christian School of Antipolo
- Our Lady of Fatima University - Antipolo Campus
- Our Lady of Peace School (OLPS)
- PAREF Northfield School for Boys, Inc.
- PAREF Rosehill School
- Prince of Peace Integrated School
- Rechab Academy
- Rich Golden Shower Montessori Center (RGSMC)
- Señora Dela Paz Academy (SPA)
- Shepherd Angels Christian School of Antipolo, Inc.
- Southridge Private High School (SPHS)
- Spring of Joy Christian School
- St. John Mary Vianney Academy
- St. Clare Montessori School and Science High School
- St. John's Wort Montessori School of Antipolo
- St. Pascual Baylon Academy
- Sumulong College Of Arts And Sciences (SCAS)
- Sumulong Memorial High School (SMHS)
- Sun Hwa International Academy (SHIA)
- The Pleasant Mount School
- WILL School of Antipolo
- World Citi Colleges Antipolo

== Transportation ==
=== Land ===
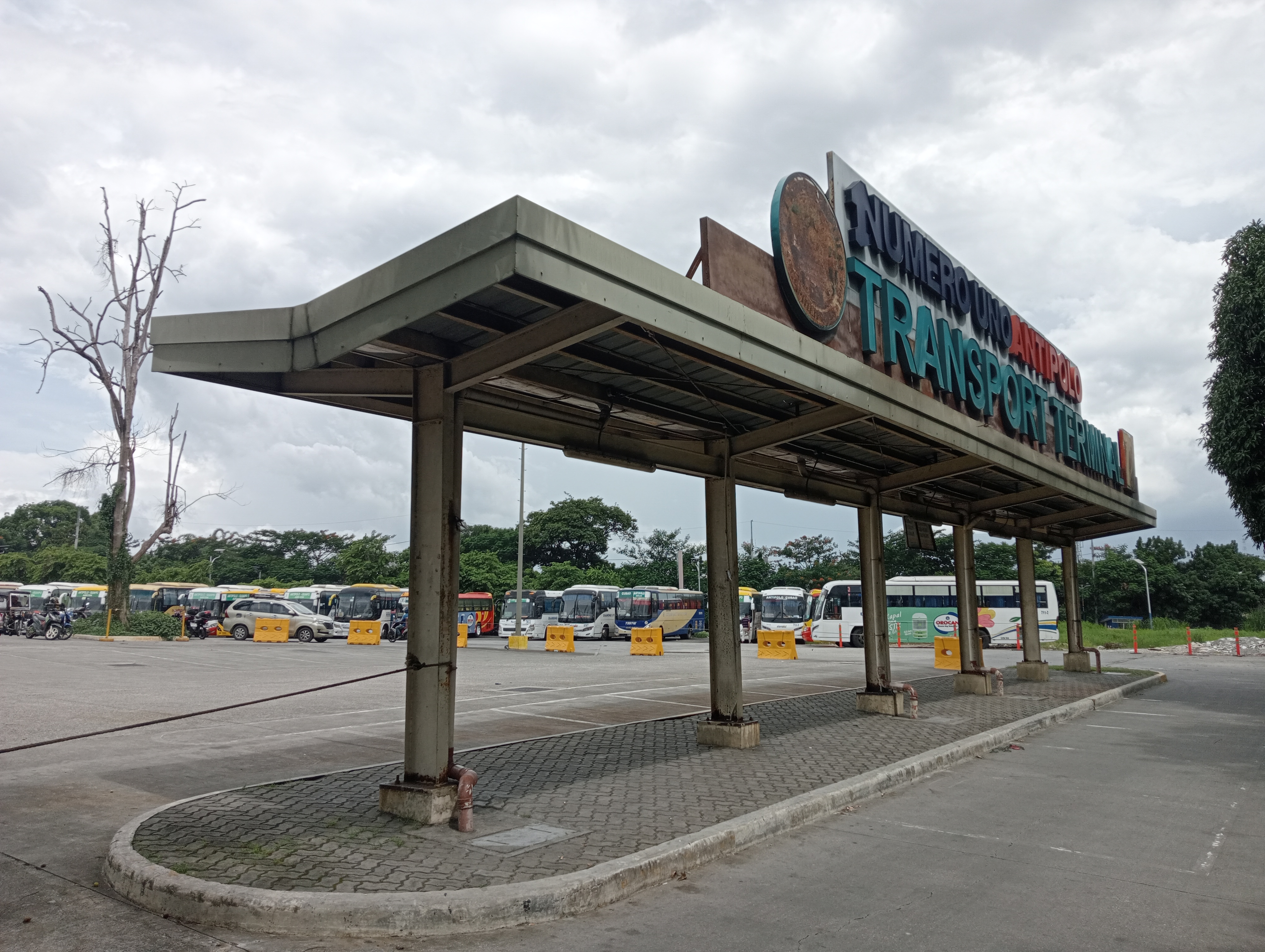
Antipolo Transport Terminal

==== Road network ====
A significant part of the N59/R-6 Marikina–Infanta Highway runs through Antipolo in a general west-east direction, serving as a major thoroughfare in the city. Other major roads in Antipolo include N59 Sumulong Highway connecting Marikina to downtown Antipolo, the latter area being defined by the circumferential L. Sumulong Memorial Circle road.

==== Rail transport ====
Antipolo station, located along the Marikina-Infanta Highway in Masinag (Barangay Mayamot in western Antipolo), serves as the LRT Line 2's eastern terminus since 2021. It is currently the only LRT-2 station in Rizal. Proposals have been made for a future extension of Line 2 further east from this station.

== See also ==
- Antipolo Cathedral
- Legislative districts of Antipolo City
- Our Lady of Peace and Good Voyage
- Roman Catholic Diocese of Antipolo
- St. James Community School

== Notable people ==
- Romeo Acop, politician
- Jestoni Alarcon, actor, politician
- April Boy Regino, singer
- Babalu, comedian
- Bianca de Vera, actress, internet personality
- Cianne Dominguez, television host, singer
- Angelito Gatlabayan, engineer, former mayor of Antipolo
- Jackie Gonzaga, dancer, television host
- Michael Leyva, fashion designer
- Xian Lim, actor
- OhMyV33Nus, professional gamer
- Mariel Pamintuan, actress
- Avery Paraiso, actor
- Pokwang, actress, comedienne
- Renz Valerio, actor
- Juan Sumulong, revolutionary, journalist, educator, politician
- Lorenzo Sumulong, lawyer, politician
- Betong Sumaya, comedian
- Gardo Versoza, actor
- Chokoleit, comedian
- Marco Masa, actor
- Angelito Gatlabayan, politician
- Casimiro "Jun" Ynares III, politician

Preceded by Morong	Capital of Morong; 1898–1899	Succeeded by Tanay
Preceded by Pasig	Capital of Rizal; 2009–present (de facto); 2020–present (de jure)	Incumbent
