= 2016 Antipolo local elections =

Philippine election

2016 Antipolo mayoral elections
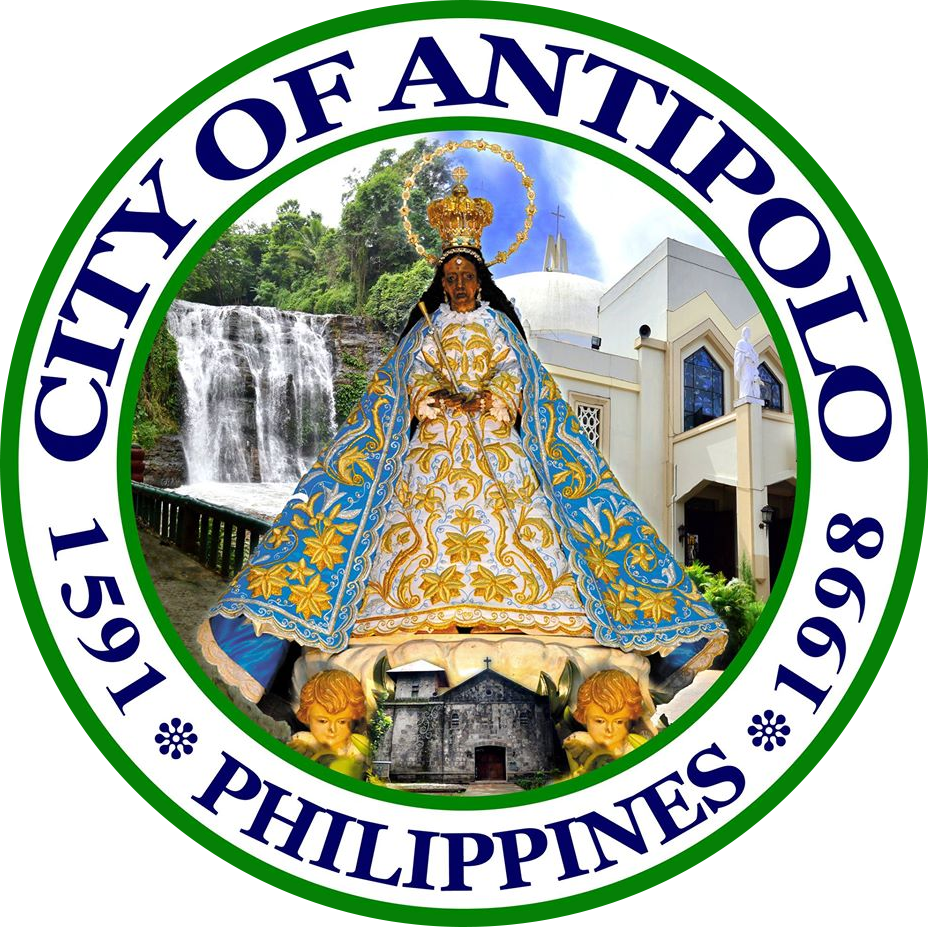
- May 9, 2016
- Turnout: 68.39%
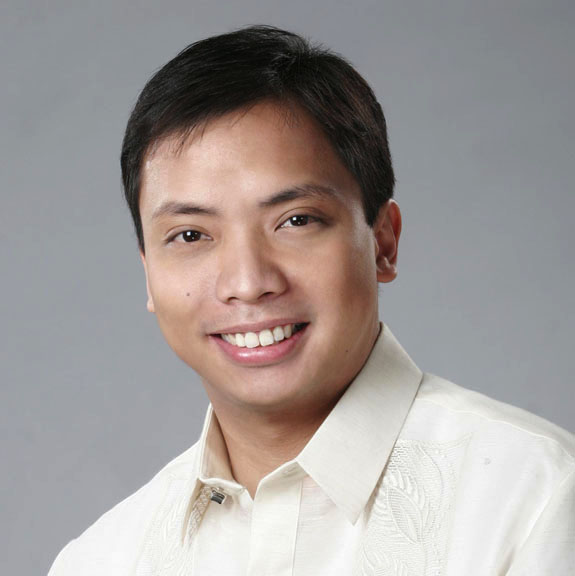
Nominee	Casimiro "Jun" Ynares III	Ronaldo "Puto" Leyva	Mario Boyet Leyva
Party	NPC	Aksyon	Lakas
Running mate	Josefina "Pining" Gatlabayan	Danilo "Nilo" Leyble	Igle Batingal
Popular vote	212,662	40,497	23,233
Percentage	70.33	13.39	7.68
Nominee	Juvy Rivas	Athan Tojon
Party	UNA	PMP
Running mate	Victor Nabarte	Fat Nabarte
Popular vote	612	342
Percentage	0.20	0.11
Mayor before election
Casimiro Ynares III
NPC
Elected mayor
Casimiro Ynares III
NPC

Local elections were held in Antipolo on May 9, 2016, within the Philippine general election. The voters elected candidates for the local elective posts in the city: the mayor, the vice mayor, the two district representatives, the two provincial board members (one for each district) and the sixteen councilors (eight for each district).

== Background ==
Mayor Casimiro Ynares III of the Nationalist People's Coalition was on his first term, and he ran for re-election for second term. His running mate was Second District Councilor Josefina Gatlabayan, the wife of Angelito Gatlabayan, former mayor and representative.

Vice Mayor Ronaldo Leyva was on his first term. Although eligible to run for re-election, he ran as mayor instead. His party chosen former Mayor Danilo Leyble who became Vice Mayor from 2004 until 2009.

First District Rep. Roberto Puno was term-limited. His party chosen his wife, media personality Chiqui Roa-Puno. He was challenged by First District Councilor Juanito "Dudok" Lawis, Sonia Ampo, and Florante "Ante" Quizon.

Second District Rep. Romeo Acop was on his second term, and he ran for re-election for third term unopposed.

First District Board Member Enrico "Rico" De Guzman was challenged by Neptalie Allen Nalog and Myrnaflor "Myrna" Quizon.

Second District Board Member Atty. Jesus Angelito "Joel" Huertas Jr. was on his second term, and he ran for re-election for third term. He was challenged by Samuel Rivera.

== Candidates ==
Names written in bold-Italic were the re-elected incumbents while in italic were incumbents lost in elections.

Antipolo has its two congressional districts that is represented by one provincial board member each, and two representatives, one for each district. Therefore, popular votes for congressional representatives and provincial board members of this city were from this city's districts only.

=== For Mayor ===
Mayor Casimiro "Jun" Ynares III defeated Vice Mayor Ronaldo "Puto" Leyva.

Antipolo Mayoralty Election
Party	Candidate	Votes	%
**NPC**	**Casimiro "Jun" Ynares III**	**212,662**	**70.33**
Aksyon	Ronaldo "Puto" Leyva	40,497	13.39
Lakas	Mario Boyet Leyva	23,233	7.68
Independent	Cherry Savile	1,084	0.36
Independent	Antonio Lagorin	835	0.28
UNA	Juvy Rivas	612	0.20
PMP	Athan Tojon	342	0.11
Invalid or blank votes		23,129	7.65
Turnout		302,394	68.39
Registered electors		442,137	
NPC **hold**			

=== For Vice Mayor ===
Second District Councilor Josefina "Pining" Gatlabayan defeated former Mayor Danilo "Nilo" Leyble.

Antipolo Vice Mayoralty Election
Party	Candidate	Votes	%
**NPC**	**Josefina "Pining" Gatlabayan**	**141,279**	**46.72**
Aksyon	Danilo "Nilo" Leyble	118,528	39.20
Independent	Alfred Zapanta	6,196	2.05
Independent	Pocholo Dominic Martinez	2,383	0.79
Independent	Joel Tatad	1,946	0.64
UNA	Victor Nabarte	1,470	0.49
Lakas	Igle Batingal	1,130	0.37
Independent	Aisah Mocsir	674	0.22
PMP	Fat Nabarte	297	0.10
Invalid or blank votes		28,491	9.42
Turnout		302,394	68.39
Registered electors		442,137	
NPC **gain** from Aksyon			

=== For Representative ===
==== First District ====
Chiqui Roa-Puno won against First District Councilor Juanito "Dudok" Lawis.

Congressional Elections in Antipolo's First District
Party	Candidate	Votes	%
**NUP**	**Chiqui Roa-Puno**	**102,093**	**71.10**
Aksyon	Juanito "Dudok" Lawis	17,183	11.97
Independent	Sonia Ampo	4,279	2.98
Independent	Florante "Ante" Quizon	2,004	1.40
Invalid or blank votes		18,022	12.55
Turnout		143,581	69.03
Registered electors		208,005	
NUP **hold**			

==== Second District ====
Rep. Romeo "Romy" Acop won unopposed.

Congressional Elections in Antipolo's Second District
Party	Candidate	Votes	%
**Liberal**	**Romeo "Romy" Acop**	**128,309**	**80.79**
Invalid or blank votes		30,504	19.21
Turnout		158,813	67.83
Registered electors		234,132	
Liberal **hold**			

=== For Provincial Board Members ===
==== First District ====
Board Member Enrico "Rico" De Guzman defeated his opponents.

Provincial Board Elections in Antipolo's First District
Party	Candidate	Votes	%
**NUP**	**Enrico "Rico" De Guzman**	**76,465**	**53.26**
Independent	Neptalie Allen Nalog	14,733	10.26
Independent	Myrnaflor "Myrna" Quizon	12,218	8.51
Invalid or blank votes		40,165	27.97
Turnout		143,581	69.03
Registered electors		208,005	
NUP **hold**			

==== Second District ====
Board Member Atty. Jesus Angelito "Joel" Huertas Jr. defeated his only opponent, Samuel Rivera.

Provincial Board Elections in Antipolo's Second District
Party	Candidate	Votes	%
**NPC**	**Jesus Angelito "Joel" Huertas Jr.**	**85,951**	**54.12%**
Independent	Samuel Rivera	25,971	16.35%
Invalid or blank votes		46,891	29.53%
Turnout		158,813	67.83%
Registered electors		234,132	
NPC **hold**			

=== For Councilors ===
==== Team AntipoLo 2016 (Team Puto-Nilo) ====
Aksyon Demokratiko Antipolo's First District
Name	Party	Results
Julius Hilotina	Aksyon	Lost
Ambet Leyble	Aksyon	Lost
Jose Mendoza, Jr.	Aksyon	Lost
Ernesto Prias	Aksyon	Lost
Emmy Sherman	Aksyon	Lost
Francisco "King" Sumulong, Jr.	Aksyon	Lost
Erik Zapanta	Aksyon	Lost
Ariel Zartiga	Aksyon	Lost

Aksyon Demokratiko Antipolo's Second District
Name	Party	Results
Roger Atim	Aksyon	Lost
Emiliana Garcia	Aksyon	Lost
Benjie Inlayo	Aksyon	Lost
Ritchie Mendoza	Aksyon	Lost
James Palarion	Aksyon	Lost
Macario Semilla, Jr.	Aksyon	Lost
Sony Villanueva	Aksyon	Lost
Alfred Zapanta	Aksyon	Lost

==== Team Ynares ====
Nationalist People's Coalition/National Unity Party Antipolo's First District
Name	Party	Results
Robert Altamirano, Jr.	NUP	Won
Ronald Barcena	NUP	Won
Arnel Camacho	NUP	Won
Pablo Oldan, Jr.	NUP	Won
Philip Pimentel	NUP	Won
Susan Garcia-Say	NUP	Won
Christian Jay Tapales	NUP	Won
Lemuel Marlowe Zapanta	NUP	Won

Nationalist People's Coalition/Liberal Party Antipolo's Second District
Name	Party	Results
Philip Conrad Acop	Liberal	Won
Christian Alarcon	NPC	Won
Nixon Aranas	NPC	Won
Eddie Lagasca	NPC	Won
Loni Leyva	NPC	Won
Tony Masangkay	Liberal	Won
Edward O'Hara	Liberal	Won
Irvin Paul Tapales	NPC	Won

==== First District ====
City Council Elections in Antipolo's First District
Party	Candidate	Votes	%
**NUP**	**Susana Garcia-Say**	**81,831**	**56.99**
**NUP**	**Ronald Barcena**	**80,988**	**56.41**
**NUP**	**Arnel Camacho**	**80,701**	**56.21**
**NUP**	**Pablo Oldan Jr.**	**78,969**	**55.00**
**NUP**	**Robert Altamirano Jr.**	**77,769**	**54.16**
**NUP**	**Christian Jay Tapales**	**72,820**	**50.72**
**NUP**	**Felipe "Phillip" Pimentel**	**68,764**	**47.89**
**NUP**	**Lemuel Marlowe Zapanta**	**56,997**	**39.70**
Aksyon	Lamberto Leyble	47,705	33.23
Aksyon	Francisco "King" Sumulong, Jr.	44,907	31.28
Aksyon	Erik Zapanta	38,398	26.74
Aksyon	Ernesto Prias	38,361	26.72
Aksyon	Julius Hilotina	17,534	12.21
Independent	Rosalie Santiago	12,992	9.05
Aksyon	Jose Mendoza Jr.	12,460	8.68
Aksyon	Ariel Zartiga	11,450	7.97
Aksyon	Emmy Sherman	10,539	7.34
Independent	Francisco Llego	8,356	5.82
Independent	Danny Banaga	7,077	4.93
Independent	Gina Odavar	6,540	4.55
Independent	Lita Laroga	5,884	4.10
KBL	Ed Bermal	4,919	3.43
Independent	Roding Rascal	4,365	3.04
Turnout		143,581	69.03
Registered electors		208,005	

==== Second District ====
City Council Elections in Antipolo's Second District
Party	Candidate	Votes	%
**Liberal**	**Philip Conrad "Bong" Acop**	**119,226**	**75.07**
**NPC**	**Catalino "Loni" Leyva**	**97,532**	**61.41**
**NPC**	**Irvin Paul "Paui" Tapales**	**95,897**	**60.38**
**NPC**	**Christian Alarcon**	**93,237**	**58.71**
**Liberal**	**Antonio "Tony" Masangkay**	**84,532**	**53.23**
**Liberal**	**Edward O'Hara**	**74,896**	**47.16**
**NPC**	**Nixon Aranas**	**64,210**	**40.43**
**NPC**	**Edilberto "Eddie" Lagasca**	**63,724**	**40.13**
Aksyon	Alfred Zapanta	45,210	28.47
Lakas	Alfred Zapanta	31,667	19.94
Aksyon	Josefina "Sony" Leyva-Villanueva	25,262	15.91
Aksyon	Emiliana Garcia	23,785	14.98
Aksyon	Benjie Inlayo	20,553	12.94
Aksyon	Ritchie Mendoza	18,032	11.35
Aksyon	James Palarion	15,275	9.62
Aksyon	Macario Semilla Jr.	13,793	8.69
Independent	Mydy Garcia	13,249	8.34
Aksyon	Roger Atim	12,374	7.79
Lakas	Antonio Perez	12,276	7.73
Independent	Nestor Arceo	10,988	6.92
Lakas	Roberto Zonio	6,011	3.78
Lakas	Jerry Claunan	5,466	3.44
Independent	Franklin Licudo	5,068	3.19
Turnout		158,813	67.83
Registered electors		234,132	
