= 2022 Antipolo local elections =

Philippine election

2022 Antipolo mayoral election
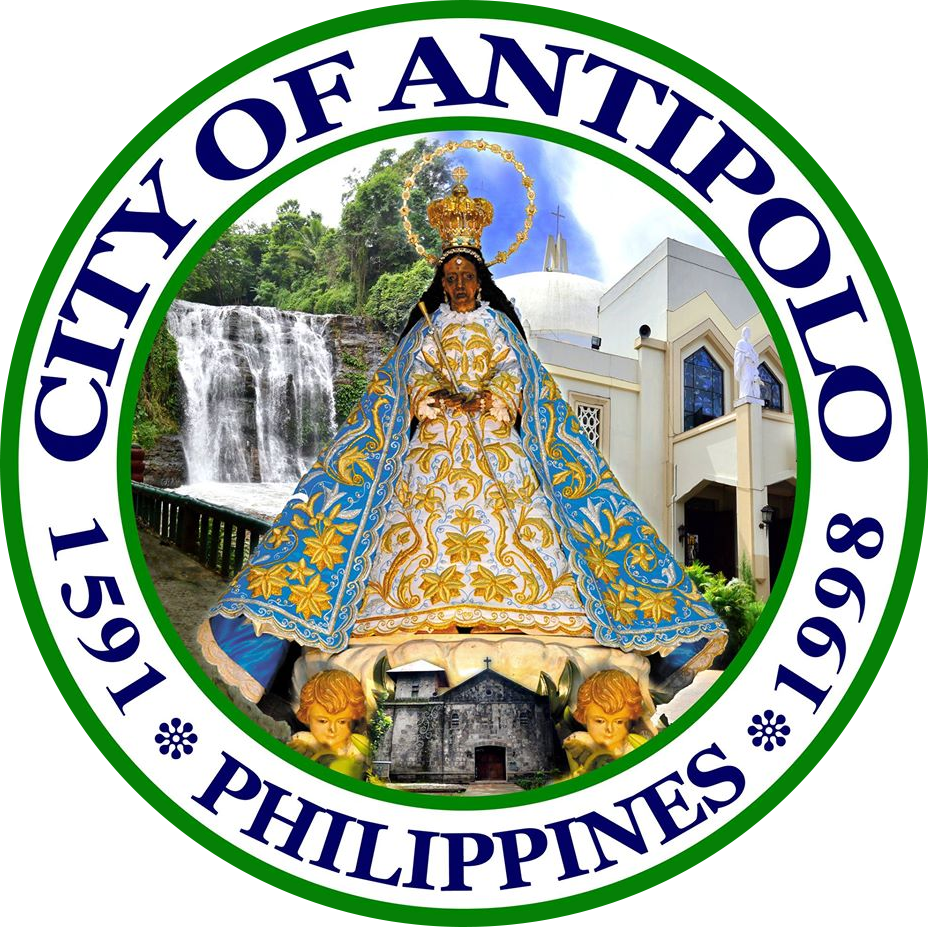
← 2019	May 9, 2022	2025 →
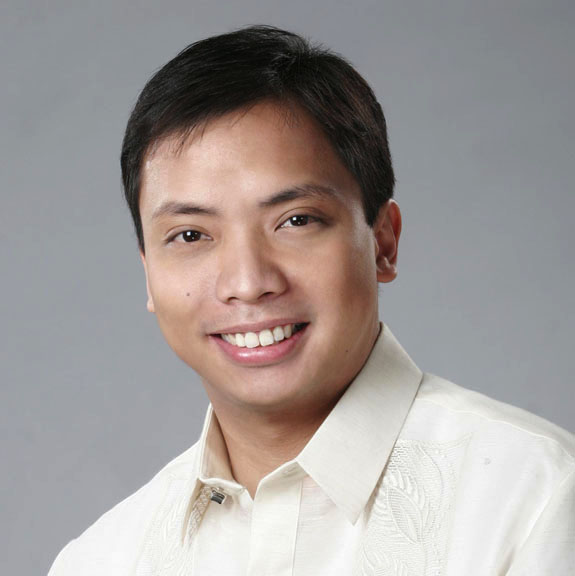
Nominee	Casimiro Ynares III
Party	NPC
Running mate	Josefina Gatlabayan
Popular vote	253,549
Mayor before election
Andrea Bautista-Ynares
NPC
Elected mayor
Casimiro "Jun" Ynares III
NPC

Local elections were held at Antipolo on May 9, 2022, as part of the Philippine general election. Held concurrently with the national elections, the electorate voted to elect a mayor, a vice mayor, sixteen councilors members, two members to the Rizal Provincial Board and two district representatives to congress. Those elected took their respective offices on June 30, 2022, for a three-year-long term.

== Background ==
Former Mayor Andrea "Andeng" Bautista-Ynares initially declared her intention to run for a second term. Later, she dropped her re-election bid, and she was replaced by her husband, former Rizal Governor and former Mayor Casimiro "Jun" Ynares III. He faced Wilfredo "Willie" Gelacio Sr., Pedro Leyble, Teddy Leyble, and Herminio Sanchez.

Vice Mayor Josefina "Pining" Gatlabayan ran for her third and final term. She faced new candidates, including Atty. Manuel Relorcasa, Edwin Reyes, and Joel Ronquillo.

First District Board Member Alexander "Bobot" Marquez sought a comeback in the city council. Former Mayor Danilo "Nilo" Leyble, who previously ran during 2016 as Vice Mayor, ran in his place unopposed.

Second District Board Member Roberto Andres "Randy" Puno Jr. ran for second term unopposed.

First District Representative Roberto "Robbie" Puno sought for second term. He was challenged by Salvador "Raldy" Abaño and Javez "Jebs" Tibio, ran independently.

Former Second District Representative Resurreccion Acop died in 2021 due to COVID-19, that made her place vacant. Her husband, former Representative Romeo Acop ran for her instead, unopposed.

== Mayoral election ==
Mayor Andrea "Andeng" Bautista-Ynares initially declared her intention to run for a second term. Later, she dropped her re-election bid, and she was replaced by her husband, former Rizal Governor and former Mayor Casimiro "Jun" Ynares III. Ynares won the elections with a huge margin against his closest opponent, Teddy Leyble.

Antipolo Mayoral Election
Party	Candidate	Votes	%
NPC	Casimiro Ynares III	253,549	
Independent	Teddy Leyble	33,019	
Independent	Pedro "Peter" Leyble	11,401	
Independent	Herminio Sanchez	7,576	
Independent	Wilfredo "Willie" Gelacio Sr.	5,829	
Total votes			
NPC hold			

== Vice mayoral election ==
Incumbent Vice Mayor Josefina "Pining" Gatlabayan was re-elected.

Antipolo Vice Mayoral Election
Party	Candidate	Votes	%
NPC	Josefina "Pining" Gatlabayan	241,996	
Independent	Manuel "Atty. Pay Awe" Relorcasa	20,270	
Independent	Edwin Reyes	16,749	
Independent	Joel Ronquillo	13,037	
Total votes			
NPC hold			

== Provincial board elections ==
=== First District ===
First District Board Member Roberto Andres "Randy" Puno Jr. won the elections unopposed.

Rizal Provincial Board election at Antipolo's 1st district
Party	Candidate	Votes	%
NUP	Roberto Andres "Randy" Puno Jr.	109,364	100.00
Total votes		109,364	100.00
NUP hold			

=== Second District ===
Second District Board Member Alexander "Bobot" Marquez sought comeback in the city council unsuccessfully. Former Mayor Danilo "Nilo" Leyble successfully replaced Marquez unopposed.

Rizal Provincial Board election at Antipolo's 2nd district
Party	Candidate	Votes	%
NPC	Danilo "Nilo" Leyble	111,527	100.00
Total votes		111,527	100.00
NPC hold			

== Congressional elections ==
=== First District ===
First District Representative Roberto "Robbie" Puno won the elections.

Philippine House of Representatives election at Antipolo's 1st district
Party	Candidate	Votes	%
NUP	Roberto "Robbie" Puno	131,611	
Independent	Salvador "Raldy" Abaño	5,150	
Independent	Javez "Jebs" Tibio	3,452	
Total votes			
NUP hold			

=== Second District ===
Former Second District Representative Resurreccion Acop died in 2021 due to COVID-19, that made her place vacant. Her husband, former Representative Romeo Acop made a successful comeback in congressional seat unopposed.

Philippine House of Representatives election at Antipolo's 2nd district
Party	Candidate	Votes	%
NUP	Romeo Acop	132,519	100.00
Total votes		132,519	100.00
NUP hold			

== City council elections ==
Party	Votes	%	Seats
National Unity Party	623,109	31.63	8
Nationalist People's Coalition	656,334	33.31	6
PDP–Laban	251,095	12.74	1
Liberal Party	127,526	6.47	1
Aksyon Demokratiko	36,779	1.87	–
Labor Party Philippines	36,111	1.83	–
Partido Federal ng Pilipinas	24,746	1.26	–
Independent	214,495	10.89	–
Ex officio seats			2
Total	1,970,195	100.00	18

=== First District ===
Antipolo City Council election at the 1st district
Party	Candidate	Votes	%
NUP	Susana Garcia-Say	95,469	
NUP	Enrico "Doc Rico" De Guzman	85,898	
NUP	Charmaine Jill "Atty. Jill" Tapales	83,538	
NUP	Eileen Grace "Doktora" Zapanta	78,729	
NUP	Agnes Oldan-Gratil	76,611	
NUP	Robert "Superman" Altamirano Sr.	74,229	
NUP	Jewel Anne "Ate Ja" Camacho	70,673	
NUP	Mariafe "Marife" Pimentel	57,962	
Independent	John Carlo "Kuya DJ" Tamayao	54,406	
Liberal	Ivy Ethel "Ate Ivy" Alvaran	45,254	
PDP–Laban	Fred Emerson Dela Pena	43,364	
Aksyon	Jonathan "Kuya Jo" Gonzales	36,779	
Independent	Allan Lopez	19,019	
Independent	Anacita Ampo	15,223	
Independent	Neptalie Allan "Tali" Nalog	13,850	
Independent	Eufrosinio "Fros" Natividad	13,664	
Independent	Ethel Casem	13,449	
Independent	Crosaldo "Aldo" Balmaceda	12,560	
WPP	Rosalin "Sally" Santiago	11,004	
WPP	Recto Dumaque	7,715	
Independent	Cressincio Panisales	7,476	
WPP	Danilo Banaga	5,998	
Total votes		956,095	100.00

Party	Votes	%	Seats
National Unity Party	656,334	68.65	8
Liberal Party	45,254	4.73	0
PDP–Laban	43,364	4.54	0
Aksyon Demokratiko	36,779	3.85	0
Labor Party Philippines	24,717	2.59	0
Independent	149,647	15.65	0
Total	956,095	100.00	8

=== Second District ===
Antipolo City Council election at the 2nd district
Party	Candidate	Votes	%
NPC	Lorenzo Juan "LJ" Sumulong III	108,627	
PDP–Laban	Ronaldo "Puto" Leyva	99,810	
NPC	Christian Edward Alarcon	98,350	
NPC	John Michael Leyva	88,365	
NPC	Angie Loui "Angie Paui" Tapales	83,877	
NPC	Christian "Dok Ian" Masangkay	83,550	
Liberal	Alfred Zapanta	82,272	
NPC	Edward O'Hara	75,049	
NPC	Nixon Aranas	67,062	
NPC	Alexander "Bobot" Marquez	51,454	
PDP–Laban	Petre "Doc Pete" Papel	41,933	
PDP–Laban	Marchito "Chito" Sorono	34,780	
PDP–Laban	Reden "Red" Llaga	31,208	
Independent	Abraham "Bobet" De Guzman Jr.	24,771	
PFP	Ferdinand "Ferdie" Serreon	24,746	
Independent	Benjamin "Benjie" Inlayo	16,193	
Independent	Jessie Trilles	13,248	
Independent	Arturo "Pastor" Pusing Jr.	10,636	
WPP	Mark Armenion	6,513	
WPP	Dante Vitalicio	4,881	
Total votes		1,014,100	100.00

Party	Votes	%	Seats
Nationalist People's Coalition	623,109	61.44	6
PDP–Laban	207,731	20.48	1
Liberal Party	82,272	8.11	1
Partido Federal ng Pilipinas	24,746	2.44	0
Labor Party Philippines	11,394	1.12	0
Independent	64,848	6.39	0
Total	1,014,100	100.00	8
