= 2013 Antipolo local elections =

2013 Antipolo mayoral election
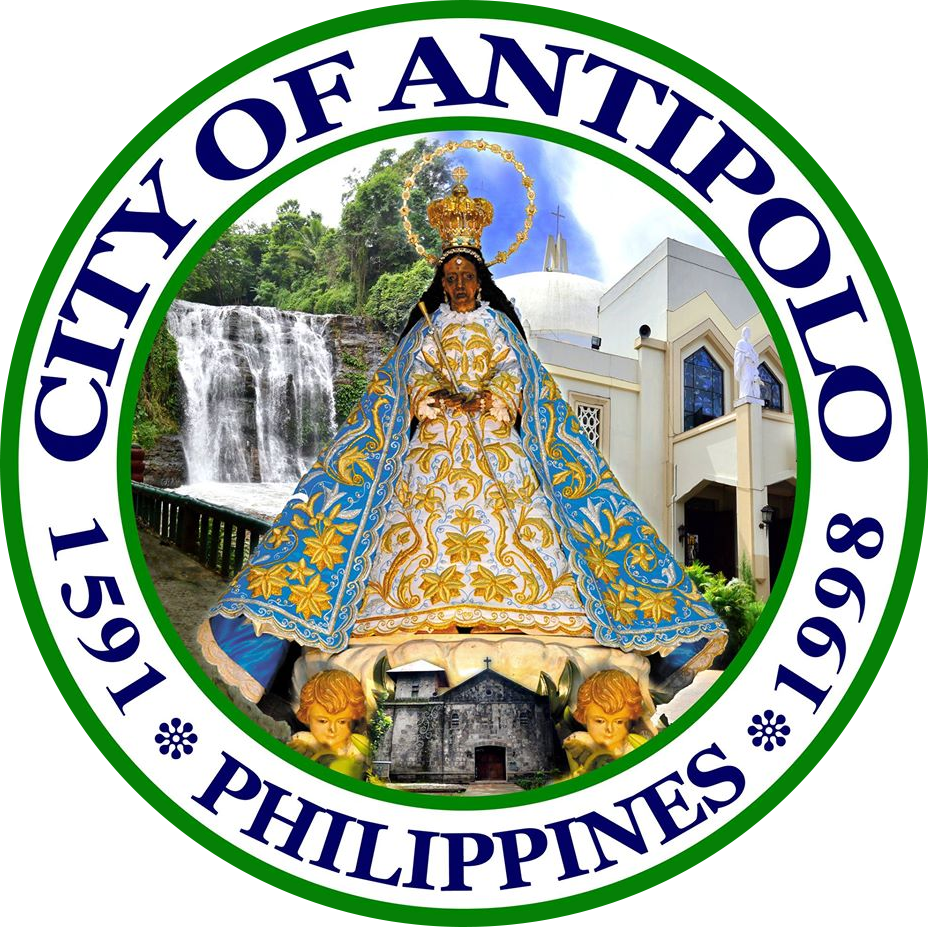
- May 13, 2013
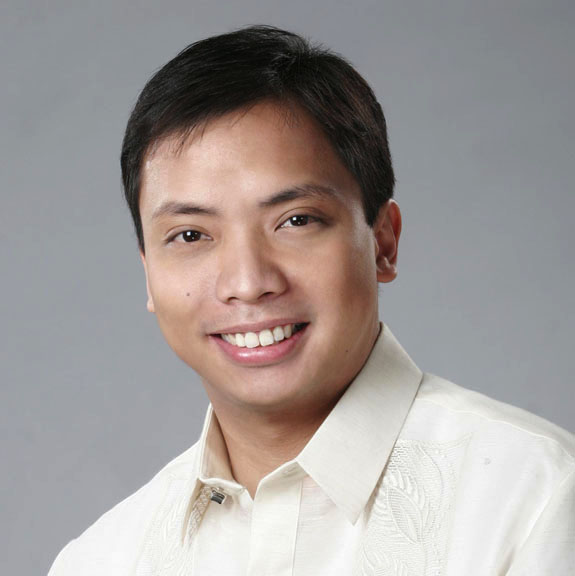
Nominee	Casimiro "Jun" Ynares III	Danilo Leyble
Party	NPC	Liberal
Running mate	Susana Garcia-Say	Ronaldo Leyva
Popular vote	128,108	121,032
Percentage	51.14	48.32
Mayor before election
Danilo Leyble
Liberal
Elected mayor
Casimiro "Jun" Ynares III
NPC

Local elections were held in Antipolo on May 13, 2013, within the Philippine general election. The voters elected for the elective local posts in the city: the mayor, vice mayor, two representatives, and the councilors, eight in each of the city's two legislative districts.

== Background ==
Mayor Danilo Leyble ran for re-election. He was challenged by incumbent Rizal Governor Casimiro "Jun" Ynares III and independent Jose Velasco.

Vice Mayor Susana Garcia-Say ran for re-election. She was challenged by incumbent Second District Councilor Ronaldo Leyva and independent Danilo Quizon.

Incumbent First District Representative Roberto "Robbie" Puno ran for re-election. He was challenged by Francisco Sumulong Jr., brother of former Mayor Victor "Vic" Sumulong, Dioscoro Esteban, Florante "Ante" Quizon, and Salvador "Raldy" Abaño.

Incumbent Second District Romeo "Romy" Acop ran for re-election, He was challenged by Lorenzo Juan "LJ" Sumulong III and Silverio "Ver" Bulanon.

== Results ==
=== For Mayor ===
Mayor Danilo Leyble was defeated by Governor Casimiro "Jun" Ynares III.

Antipolo mayoral election
Party	Candidate	Votes	%
NPC	Casimiro "Jun" Ynares III	128,108	51.14
Liberal	Danilo Leyble	121,032	48.32
Independent	Jose M. Velasco	1,366	0.55
Margin of victory		7,076	2.82
Valid ballots		250,506	99.13
Invalid or blank votes		2,199	0.87
Total votes		252,705	100.00
NPC gain from Liberal			

=== For Vice Mayor ===
Vice Mayor Susana Garcia-Say was defeated by Brgy. Dalig Chairman and former Councilor Ronaldo Leyva.

Antipolo Vice Mayoral Election
Party	Candidate	Votes	%
Liberal	Ronaldo Leyva	143,775	60.26
NUP	Susana Garcia-Say	90,884	38.08
Independent	Danilo Quizon	3,953	1.66
Margin of victory		52,891	22.17
Valid ballots		238,572	94.41
Invalid or blank votes		14,133	5.59
Total votes		252,705	100.00
Liberal gain from NUP			

=== For Representative ===
==== First District ====
Rep. Roberto Puno was re-elected.

Congressional Election for Antipolo's First District
Party	Candidate	Votes	%
NUP	Roberto Puno	86,705	76.78
Independent	Francisco Sumulong Jr.	20,391	18.06
Independent	Dioscoro Esteban Jr.	3,369	2.98
Independent	Florante Quizon	1,608	1.42
Independent	Salvador Abaño	851	0.75
Total votes		112,924	100.00
NUP hold			

==== Second District ====
Rep. Romeo Acop defeated Lorenzo Juan "LJ" Sumulong III, cousin of former Mayor Victor "Vic" Sumulong.

Congressional Election for Antipolo's Second District
Party	Candidate	Votes	%
Liberal	Romeo Acop	74,109	61.79
PDP–Laban	Lorenzo Juan Sumulong III	44,612	37.20
Independent	Silverio Bulanon	1,217	1.01
Total votes		119,938	100.00
Liberal hold			

=== For Board Member ===
All two legislative districts of Antipolo will elect Sangguniang Panlalawigan or provincial board members.

==== First District ====
Board Member Dr. Enrico De Guzman defeated his closest rival Ernesto Prias.

Board Member Election for Antipolo's First District
Party	Candidate	Votes	%
NUP	Enrico De Guzman	42,315	
Liberal	Ernesto Prias	30,690	
PDP–Laban	Sonia Ampo	12,105	
Independent	Telesforo Machon	1,437	
Independent	Jerrico Avecilla	1,184	
Total votes		87,731	

==== Second District ====
Board Member Jesus Angelito Huertas Jr. was re-elected.

Board Member Election for Antipolo's Second District
Party	Candidate	Votes	%
NPC	Jesus Angelito Huertas Jr.	47,463	
Liberal	Marchito Soroño	23,736	
PDP–Laban	Nixon Aranas	19,422	
Total votes		90,621	

=== For City Councilors ===
==== Candidates ====
===== Administration coalition (Team P-Noy-Antipolo) =====
Liberal Party/Antipolo-1st District
Name	Party
Prudencio Aquino	Liberal
Willy Comilang	Liberal
Juanito Lawis	Liberal
Pablo Oldan Jr.	Liberal
Felipe Pimentel	Liberal
Rommel Sierra	Liberal
Christian Jay Tapales	Liberal
Gil Tuyay	Liberal

Liberal Party/Antipolo-2nd District
Name	Party
Romulo Andrade	Liberal
Braga Bon Camba	Liberal
Celestino Gatlabayan	Liberal
Lolie Lat	Independent
Rowell Macapagal	Liberal
Tony Masangkay	Liberal
Edward O'Hara	Liberal
Alfred Zapanta	Liberal

===== Primary opposition coalition (Team Ynares-Say) =====
Nationalist People's Coalition/National Unity Party/Antipolo-1st District
Name	Party
Robert Altamirano Jr.	NUP
Ronald Barcena	NUP
Renato Beltran	NUP
Maria Rosario Biagtan	NUP
Arnel Camacho	NUP
Marvin Garcia	NUP
Troadio Reyes	NUP
Lemuel Marlowe Zapanta	NUP

Nationalist People's Coalition/National Unity Party/Antipolo-2nd District
Name	Party
Philip Conrad Acop	Independent
Christian Alarcon	NPC
Edwin Avilla	NPC
Pining Gatlabayan	NPC
Ed Lagasca	NPC
Loni Leyva	NPC
Armando Panganiban	NPC
Irvin Paul Tapales	NPC

==== First District ====
City Council Election for Antipolo's First District
Party	Candidate	Votes	%
Liberal	Christian Jay Tapales	50,527	
NUP	Ronald Barcena	48,754	
NUP	Lemuel Marlowe Zapanta	43,954	
Liberal	Juanito Lawis	43,491	
Liberal	Pablo Oldan Jr.	42,511	
NUP	Robert Altamirano Jr.	39,662	
NUP	Arnel Camacho	39,341	
Liberal	Felipe Pimentel	38,041	
NUP	Marvin Garcia	35,374	
Liberal	Prudencio Aquino	34,816	
Liberal	Gil Tuyay	32,142	
NUP	Maria Rosario Biagtan	30,674	
NUP	Troadio Reyes	30,580	
PDP–Laban	Sonny Agustin	29,208	
NUP	Renato Beltran	28,483	
Liberal	Rommel Sierra	28,112	
Liberal	Willy Comilang	24,107	
UNA	Danilo Aquino	12,820	
Independent	Lynn Alegre	11,339	
Independent	Jonathan Gonzales	7,358	
Independent	Herminio Sanchez	6,528	
Independent	Neptalie Allan Nalog	5,266	
Independent	Jocelyn Arocena	5,041	
UNA	Lea Villalon	4,993	
Independent	Yobs Alejo	4,647	
Independent	Norberto Tibayan	3,848	
Invalid or blank votes			
Total votes		681,608	100.00

==== Second District ====
City Council Election for Antipolo's Second District
Party	Candidate	Votes	%
NPC	Josefina Gatlabayan	58,665	
Independent	Philip Conrad "Bong" Acop	57,127	
NPC	Loni Leyva	47,060	
NPC	Christian Alarcon	44,169	
NPC	Paui Tapales	42,442	
Liberal	Alfred Zapanta	40,121	
Liberal	Edward O'Hara	34,380	
Liberal	Antonio Masangkay	34,371	
Liberal	Celestino Gatlabayan	33,600	
NPC	Armando Panganiban	30,373	
NPC	Edilberto Lagasca	29,580	
Liberal	Romulo Andrade	26,050	
Independent	Sonny Tapales	25,633	
Liberal	Bon Braga Camba	23,181	
NPC	Edwin Avilla	22,827	
Liberal	Rowell Macapagal	18,109	
PDP–Laban	Wowie Zapanta	17,830	
Independent	Lolie Lat	17,030	
PDP–Laban	Sony Leyva	16,058	
PDP–Laban	Josme Macabuhay	14,833	
PDP–Laban	Dani Silva	12,618	
UNA	Lala Ngo	12,510	
Independent	Ferdie Serreon	12,292	
Independent	LJ Javier	5,433	
Independent	Ricardo Immaculata	4,698	
Independent	Elmer Enlayo Sr.	4,201	
Independent	Nestor Jornacion	3,999	
Independent	Mario Abriam	3,768	
Independent	Ed Dumangas	3,003	
Independent	Alex Sandiego	2,911	
Independent	Danilo Dipad	2,293	
Independent	Rodger Sumicad	2,291	
Independent	Jomar Lituania	2,002	
Invalid or blank votes			
Total votes		705,458	100.00
