= 2026 Antipolo's 2nd congressional district special election =

Special election for a Philippine House of Representatives seat

- March 14, 2026

Antipolo's 2nd congressional district
- Registered: 252,793
- Turnout: 84,367 (33.37%)
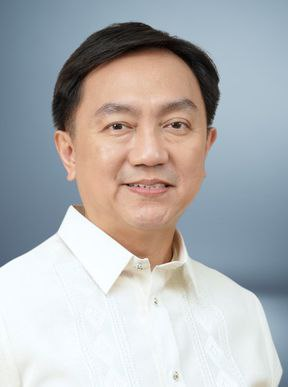

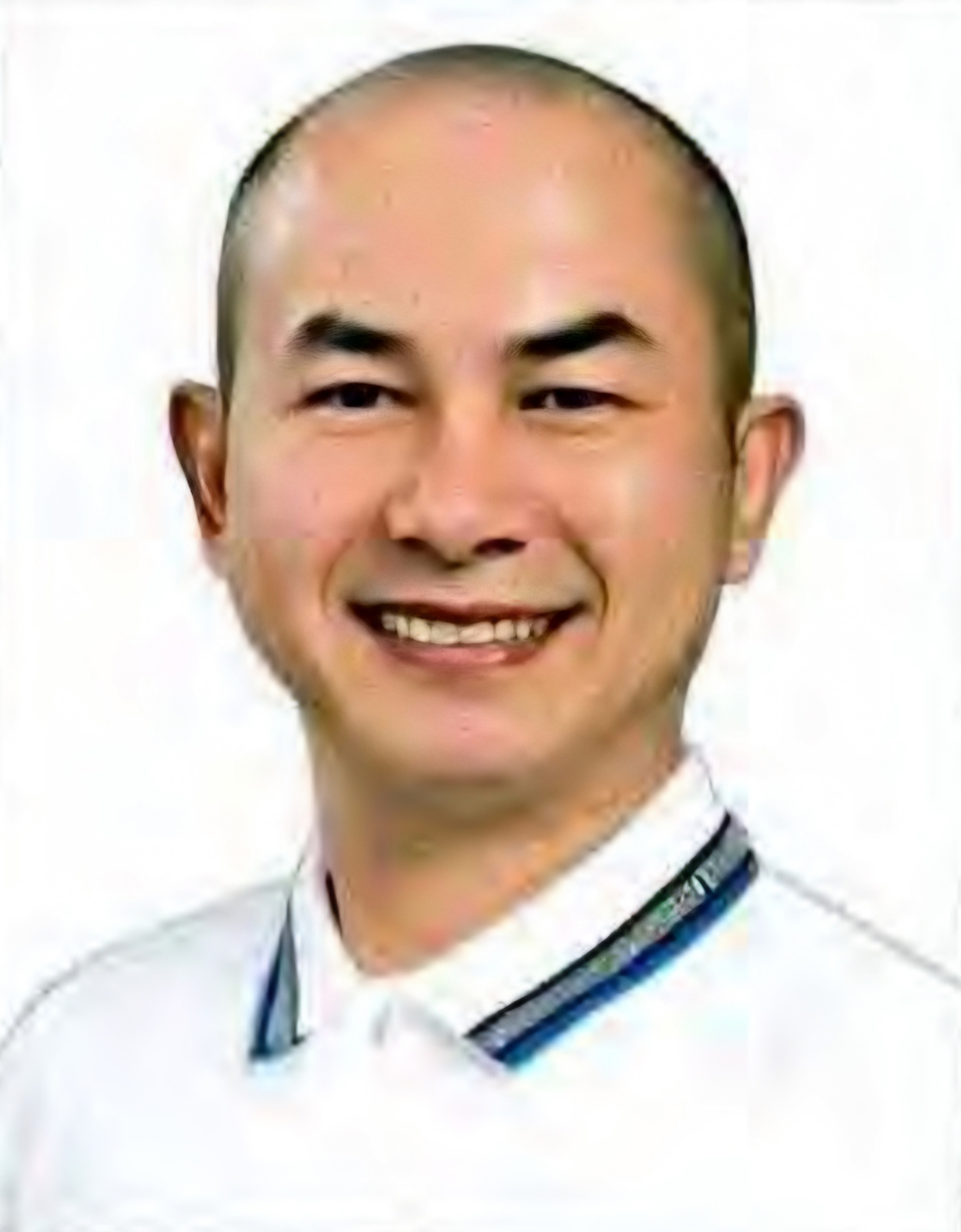

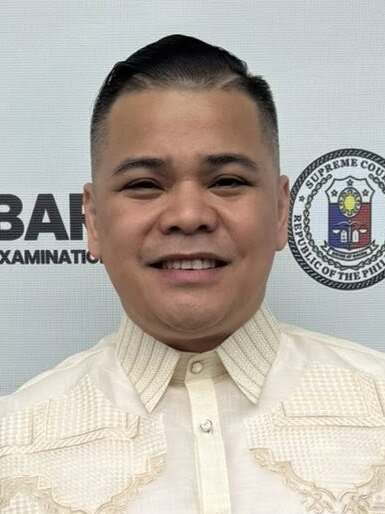
Candidate	Bong Acop	Red Llaga	Paui Tapales
Party	NUP	Independent	Independent
Popular vote	60,051	12,054	10,080
Percentage	71.87%	14.43%	12.06%
House representative before election
Romeo Acop
NUP
Elected House representative
Bong Acop
NUP

A special election was held in Antipolo's 2nd congressional district on March 14, 2026, to fill the district's vacant seat in the House of Representatives of the Philippines for the remainder of the 20th Congress.

The vacancy arose when Romeo Acop, the incumbent, died on December 20, 2025. This is the first election since Hagedorn vs. House of Representatives case, where the Supreme Court ruled that the Commission on Elections (COMELEC) can call a special election even without notification from the House.

Acop's son, Bong, won the election, defeating five other candidates to serve the remainder of his father's term until June 30, 2028.

== Electoral system ==
The House of Representatives is elected via parallel voting system, with 80% of seats elected from congressional districts, and 20% from the party-list system. Each district sends one representative to the House of Representatives. An election to the seat is via first-past-the-post, in which the candidate with the most votes, whether or not one has a majority, wins the seat.

Based on Republic Act (RA) No. 6645, in order for a special election to take place, the seat must be vacated, the relevant chamber notifies the COMELEC the existence of a vacancy, then the COMELEC schedules the special election. RA No. 7166 supposedly removed the condition of the chamber informing the commission of the vacancy, but the COMELEC still had always waited on the chamber's resolution before scheduling a special election.

After the Hagedorn vs. House of Representatives decision by the Supreme Court in 2025, this is the first special election where the commission no longer has to wait for a congressional resolution to call for a special election. The case arose after then incumbent of Palawan's 2nd district, Edward Hagedorn, died, and that the House of Representatives did not issue a resolution mandating the COMELEC to hold the special election, which led the seat to be vacant until the end of the 19th Congress

Meanwhile, according to RA No. 8295, should only one candidate file to run in the special election, the COMELEC will declare that candidate as the winner and will no longer hold the election.

== Background ==
Romeo Acop, a former police officer, won in the 2010 elections. He was reelected for the maximum two times until he was term-limited in 2019. His wife, Resurreccion, a medical doctor, ran and won in 2019. She died in 2021, less than a year before the 2022 elections, where he won. He defended the seat in 2025, running unopposed.

Acop died on December 20, 2025. His National Unity Party called a special election to be held, citing RA No. 7166, and the aforementioned Hagedorn case. On January 14, 2026, the Commission on Elections scheduled the special election on March 14. The COMELEC informed Speaker Bojie Dy of the matter.

The COMELEC set the filing of candidacy on February 5 to 7, campaigning on February 12 to March 12, with the election period from February 12 to March 29. As law prohibits voter registration during special elections, continuing registration for the 2028 elections was suspended, and voters who were not able to register prior to January 16 would not have been able to vote in the special election. The commission also reminded political parties to nominate only one candidate; otherwise all nominees with the same party shall be classified as independents.

=== Preparation ===
On January 14, the COMELEC asked the Office of the President for a budget of ₱98 million (US$1.99 million) as the 2026 budget, which was signed by President Bongbong Marcos days earlier, only gave the commission a budget of ₱11 million (US$223,350.25) for special and recall elections.

By early February, Garcia said that the Department of Budget and Management (DBM) denied giving the COMELEC additional funds for special election. The DBM denied that they had not approved COMELEC's request, saying that they advised the latter that "funding requirement for the special election may be charged against COMELEC’s existing and available appropriations". The DBM said that the COMELEC has ₱20.93 billion (US$424.89 million) in accumulated unobligated allotments from previous years; Garcia said that COMELEC records show that these unobligated allotments do not exist. The COMELEC reduced the budget to ₱75 million (US$1.52 million), while still guaranteeing the salary increase for the poll workers will still be honored, although the meal allowance will be lessened.

On February 21, the National Printing Office finished printing 252,793 ballots for the election.

President Marcos declared election day a holiday in the district. The COMELEC ordered the canvassing board to finish the count within 36 hours from when it first convened, with canvassing to be done at the Ynares Event Center.

=== District profile ===
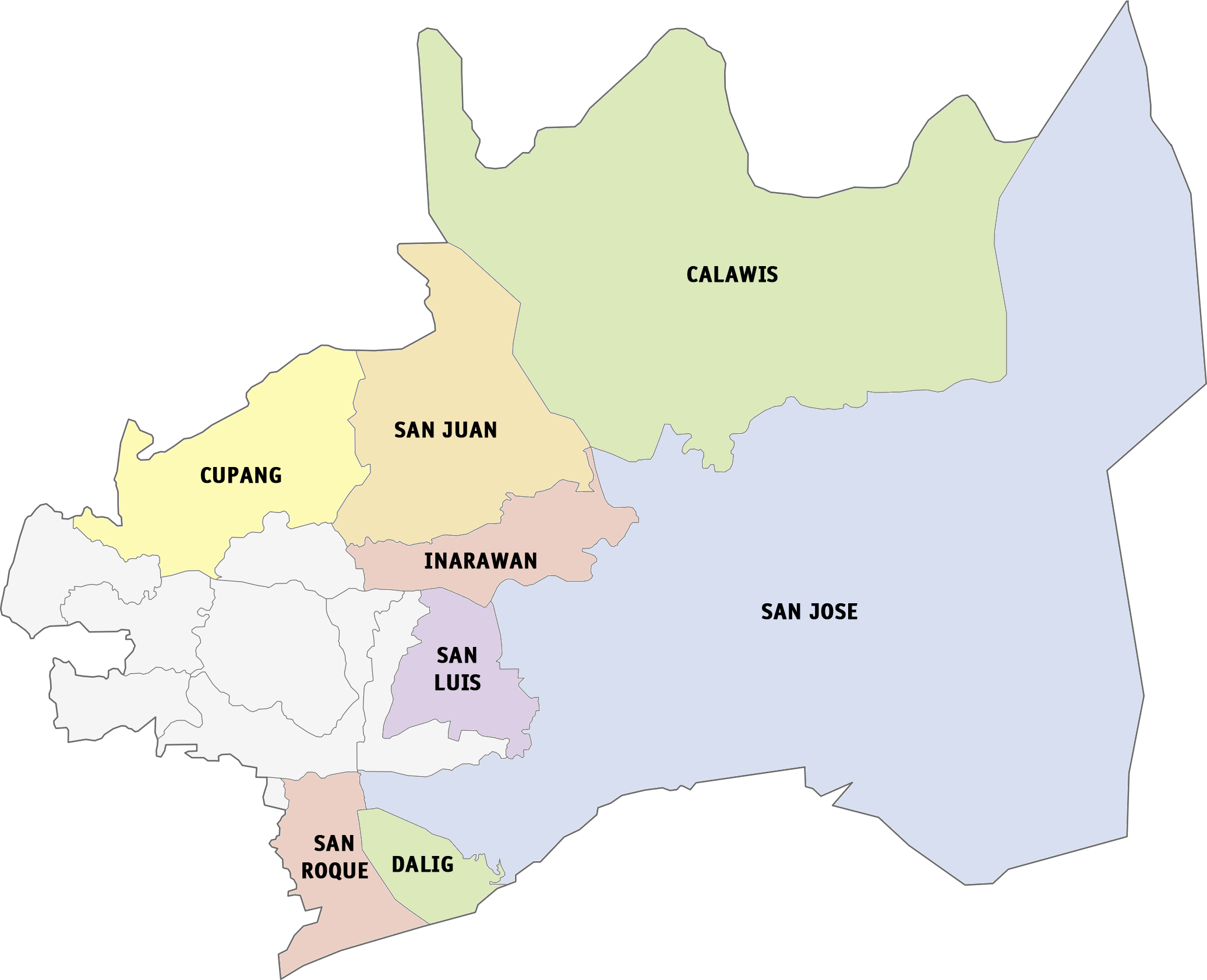
The 2nd district within Antipolo

Antipolo's 2nd district consists of the eastern barangays of Calawis, Cupang, Dalig, Inarawan, San Jose, San Juan, San Luis and San Roque since its establishment in 2003. According to official COMELEC data from the 2025 midterm elections, the district had 242,872 registered voters.

Romeo Acop and his wife Resurreccion have been the House representatives since 2010 until their deaths in 2025 and 2021, respectively.

== Candidates ==
The COMELEC expected five to six candidates. After filing, seven people filed as candidates:

1. Bong Acop (NUP), pediatrician and former councilor (2013–2022), son of Romeo and Resurrecion Acop
2. Baby Cafirma (independent), entrepreneur and animal welfare advocate
3. Dan Infante (independent), human resources consultant
4. Red Llaga (independent), entrepreneur and mayoral candidate (2025)
5. Nat Lobigas (independent), lawyer and Securities and Exchange Commission administrative judge (1997–2000)
6. Paui Tapales (independent), lawyer and incumbent councilor (since 2025)

Tapales finished eighth in the 2025 city council elections. Llaga was the defeated mayoral candidate in 2025, losing to Casimiro Ynares III. Llaga also lost in the 2022 city council elections.

=== Endorsements ===
Red Llaga (Independent)

Politicians

- Richard Mata, pediatrician and candidate in the 2025 Philippine Senate election
- Ferdinand Topacio, deputy spokesperson of PDP

=== Withdrawals ===
One of the seven candidates withdrew during campaigning:

1. LJ Sumulong (NPC), incumbent councilor (since 2022)
  On February 16, Sumulong announced that he is withdrawing from the race. He filed paperwork to make his withdrawal official on February 18. The COMELEC stated that the NPC may opt to nominate a substitute in lieu of Sumulong.

Sumulong was the topnotcher in the 2025 city council elections; he also lost to Romeo Acop in 2010 and 2013.

== Campaign ==
Campaigning was from February 12 to March 12, 2026. As the special election would have been counted manually, Garcia explained that the people who filed candidacies were considered candidates from the moment they filed paperwork, unlike in automated elections where they become candidates only on the start of the campaign period. This means provisions on premature campaigning apply.

Less than a week into the campaign, Sumulong announced, after meeting with Mayor Casimiro Ynares III and Bong Acop, that he is withdrawing from the race. Sumulong's statement stated that he is withdrawing "out of respect for the memory of the late Representative Romeo Acop." As this was not an automated election, Garcia said that since "voters write the names of the candidates themselves", Sumulong's withdrawal "has no effect on us whatsoever" in terms of their preparations.

On March 2, a resident represented by Mark Tolentino sued to disqualify Acop for allegedly buying votes. A social media post claiming Acop's disqualification was then refuted by the COMELEC, with them confirming that while they had received the complaint, they had not yet ruled on the matter. The commission also banned candidates from offering the government's social services to voters for nine days preceding the election.

Garcia stated that the commission was monitoring the candidates' remarks to make sure no one violated the safe spaces laws and the COMELEC's own anti-discrimination and safe space policy. The COMELEC was targeting a voter turnout of at least 65%.

== Results ==
COMELEC expected that the winner will be proclaimed the evening after election day. By the end of voting hours, the commission reported a turnout of just over 26%. The election was characterized by Garcia as peaceful and orderly.

Reports of campaigning on polling areas were referred to the city election officer and the COMELEC's law department.

2026 Antipolo's 2nd congressional district special election
Candidate	Party	Votes	%	+/–
Bong Acop	National Unity Party	60,051	71.87	−28.13
Red Llaga	Independent	12,054	14.43	N/A
Paui Tapales	Independent	10,080	12.06	N/A
Nat Lobigas	Independent	754	0.90	N/A
Dan Infante	Independent	412	0.49	N/A
Baby Cafirma	Independent	199	0.24	N/A
Total		83,550	100.00	–
Valid votes		83,550	99.03	+24.25
Invalid/blank votes		817	0.97	−24.25
Total votes		84,367	100.00	–
Registered voters/turnout		252,793	33.37	−39.27
Majority		47,997	57.45	−42.55
National Unity Party hold				

Canvassing proceeded faster than expected, with the canvassing board proclaiming Acop by 3:00 a.m. on election night. Acop thanked his supporters after his proclamation. Llaga's camp sued Acop anew for disqualification, alleging illegal electioneering. The COMELEC announced that more than a third of the voters turned out.

== Aftermath ==
Acop took his oath of office first before Antipolo mayor Casimiro Ynares III on the morning of March 16 at the Antipolo City Hall, then on the afternoon before Speaker Bojie Dy at the Batasang Pambansa Complex.

Larry Gadon, presidential adviser for poverty alleviation and a critic of Vice President Sara Duterte, pointed out that Duterte's supposed endorsement of Llaga as a "kiss of death". Llaga's counsel, Mark Tolentino, denied that Duterte herself endorsed Llaga, but Llaga did seek the vice president's endorsement. Gadon replied that "Duterte organizations officially campaigned for and supported and endorsed Llaga-by and large, it has the same effect of endorsement.”

== 2025 election result ==
Romeo Acop won in 2025 unopposed.

2025 Philippine House of Representatives election at Antipolo's 2nd district
Candidate	Party	Votes	%
Romeo Acop	National Unity Party	131,925	100.00
Total		131,925	100.00
Valid votes		131,925	74.78
Invalid/blank votes		44,496	25.22
Total votes		176,421	100.00
Registered voters/turnout		242,872	72.64
National Unity Party hold			

== See also ==
- 1994 Rizal's 1st congressional district special election, last special election that involved Antipolo
