= 2016 Philippine House of Representatives elections in Calabarzon =

Elections were held in Calabarzon for seats in the House of Representatives of the Philippines on May 9, 2016.

The candidate with the most votes won that district's seat for the 17th Congress of the Philippines.

== Summary ==
Party	Popular vote	%	Swing	Seats won	Change
Liberal	2,164,114	13.61		14	▲4
NPC	812,620	13.75		4	▼1
NUP	719,929	12.18		3	Steady
UNA	345,724	5.85		2	▲1
Nacionalista	318,929	5.40		2	▲1
Lakas	141,468	2.39		1	▼2
Independent	303,701	5.14		0	
Aksyon	17,183	0.29		0	
PDP–Laban	5,775	0.10		0	
LM	203	0.03		0	
Valid votes	4,832,646	81.74%		26	
Invalid votes	1,079,237	18.26%			
Turnout	5,911,883	77.59%			
Registered voters	7,619,272	100.00%			

== Antipolo ==
=== 1st District ===
Roberto Puno is term-limited as he has reached the maximum three-term limit for any elective official. His wife, media personality Chiqui Roa-Puno, will run instead and will be challenged by incumbent first district councilor Juanito "Dudok" Lawis.

2016 Philippine House of Representatives election in Antipolo's 1st district
Party	Candidate	Votes	%
NUP	Chiqui Roa-Puno	102,093	71.10
Aksyon	Juanito Lawis	17,183	11.97
Independent	Sonia Ampo	4,279	2.98
Independent	Florante Quizon	2,004	1.40
Invalid or blank votes		18,022	12.55
Total votes		143,581	100.00
NUP hold			

=== 2nd District ===
Romeo M. Acop is running for reelection for his third and final term unopposed.

2016 Philippine House of Representatives election in Antipolo's 2nd district
Party	Candidate	Votes	%
Liberal	Romeo M. Acop	128,309	80.79
Invalid or blank votes		30,504	19.21
Total votes		158,813	100.00
Liberal hold			

== Batangas ==
=== 1st District ===
Eileen Ermita-Buhain is the incumbent. She changed her party affiliation from Lakas to Nacionalista.

2016 Philippine House of Representatives election in Batangas's 1st District
Party	Candidate	Votes	%
Nacionalista	Eileen Ermita-Buhain	191,351	69.49
Independent	Valentino Lopez	43,846	15.92
Invalid or blank votes		40,164	14.59
Total votes		275,361	100.00
Nacionalista hold			

=== 2nd District ===
Raneo Abu is the incumbent.

2016 Philippine House of Representatives election in Batangas's 2nd District
Party	Candidate	Votes	%
Nacionalista	Raneo Abu	78,369	54.39
NUP	Nicasio Conti	52,733	36.60
Invalid or blank votes		12,974	9.01
Total votes		144,076	100.00
Nacionalista hold			

=== 3rd District ===
Nelson Collantes is the incumbent. His opponent is DZJV reporter Nestor Burgos. On October 17, Burgos withdrew his candidacy, thus resulting to Collantes running unopposed. On December 10, Collantes also withdrew his candidacy to give way to his wife, Maria Theresa.

2016 Philippine House of Representatives election in Batangas's 3rd District
Party	Candidate	Votes	%
Liberal	Maria Theresa Collantes	186,440	58.04
Invalid or blank votes		134,768	41.96
Total votes		321,208	100.00
Liberal hold			

=== 4th District ===
Incumbent Mark Llandro is the last Representative of the 4th District of Batangas. Running for a seat are former Board Member Lianda Bolilia and incumbent Taysan Mayor Victor Portugal, Jr.

2016 Philippine House of Representatives election in Batangas's 4th District
Party	Candidate	Votes	%
Liberal	Lianda Bolilia	110,485	50.29
NPC	Victor Portugal, Jr.	91,392	41.60
Invalid or blank votes		17,811	8.11
Total votes		219,688	100.00
Liberal gain from NPC			

=== 5th District (Batangas City) ===
Incumbent 2nd District Board Member Mario Vittorio Mariño will run for the newly created 5th District against Danilo Berberabe, Felipe Baroja, Carloto Bisa and former Justice Secretary Hernando Perez.

2016 Philippine House of Representatives election in Batangas's 5th District (Lone District of Batangas City)
Party	Candidate	Votes	%
Liberal	Mario Vittorio Mariño	69,577	45.92
UNA	Danilo Berberabe	46,967	30.99
Independent	Hernando Perez	15,951	10.53
Independent	Felipe Baroja	5,587	3.69
Independent	Carlito Bisa	4,145	2.74
Invalid or blank votes		9,284	6.13
Total votes		151,511	100.00
Liberal win (new seat)			

=== 6th District (Lipa City) ===
Incumbent Mark Llandro Mendoza who came from the 4th District is term-limited and is running for Governor. Running for a seat in Congress is Bernadette Sabili, wife of Mayor Meynard Sabili and incumbent Governor Vilma Santos-Recto. Initially, Sabili is running under the National Unity Party. Like her husband, the party withdrew her nomination due to its coalition with the Liberal Party. As a result, Sabili is running as an independent.

2016 Philippine House of Representatives election in Batangas's 6th District (Lone District of Lipa City)
Party	Candidate	Votes	%
Liberal	Vilma Santos-Recto	83,492	56.13
NUP	Bernadette Sabili	60,472	40.65
Invalid or blank votes		4,796	3.22
Total votes		148,760	100.00
Liberal win (new seat)			

== Biñan ==
By virtue of Republic Act No. 10658 authored by Laguna 1st district Rep. Danilo Fernandez, a new district was carved out of the existing 1st district and is composed solely of Biñan City. Incumbent Biñan Mayor Marlyn Alonte-Naguiat of the Liberal Party will run for the newly created district unopposed.

2016 Philippine House of Representatives election in Biñan's Lone District
Party	Candidate	Votes	%
Liberal	Marlyn Alonte-Naguiat	88,773	68.04
Invalid or blank votes		41,704	31.96
Total votes		130,477	100.00
Liberal win (new seat)			

== Cavite ==
=== 1st District ===
The 1st district is composed of Cavite City, and the municipalities of Kawit, Noveleta, and Rosario.

First term incumbent Francis Gerald Abaya, who was elected with 77% of the vote in 2013, is seeking re-election. Marina Rieta Granados of the Nationalist People's Coalition is running against him.

2016 Philippine House of Representatives election in Cavite 1st District.
Party	Candidate	Votes	%
Liberal	Francis Gerald Abaya	115,891	72.26
NPC	Marina Rieta Granados	17,767	10.81
Invalid or blank votes		26,983	16.93
Total votes		160,641	100.00
Liberal hold			

=== 2nd District ===
The 2nd district is composed solely of the city of Bacoor.

Two-term incumbent Lani Mercado-Revilla decided not to run for re-election and instead run for mayor of Bacoor. Her brother-in-law, incumbent Bacoor Mayor Strike Revilla is her party's nominee. Marc Orlin Buena of the Liberal Party is running against him.

2016 Philippine House of Representatives election in Cavite 2nd District.
Party	Candidate	Votes	%
Lakas	Edwin "Strike" Revilla	141,468	76.48
Liberal	Mark Orline Buena	16,228	8.77
Invalid or blank votes		27,280	14.75
Total votes		184,976	100.00
Lakas hold			

=== 3rd District ===
The 3rd district is made up solely of the city of Imus.

First term incumbent Alex Advincula, who was elected with 66% of the vote in 2013, is running for re-election unopposed.

2016 Philippine House of Representatives election in Cavite 3rd District.
Party	Candidate	Votes	%
Liberal	Alex Advincula	106,268	79.26
Invalid or blank votes		26,699	20.74
Total votes		135,967	100.00
Liberal hold			

=== 4th District ===
The 4th district is composed solely of the city of Dasmariñas.

Three-term incumbent Elpidio Barzaga Jr. is barred by term limits from seeking another term. He is instead running for mayor of Dasmariñas. His wife, incumbent Mayor Jennifer Barzaga is his party's nominee. Independent candidate Alen Manzano is also running for the seat.

2016 Philippine House of Representatives election in Cavite 4th District.
Party	Candidate	Votes	%
NUP	Jennifer Barzaga	227,022	89.68
Independent	Alen Manzano	11,064	4.37
Invalid or blank votes		15,068	5.95
Total votes		253,154	100.00
NUP hold			

=== 5th District ===
The 5th district is composed of the municipalities of Carmona, General Mariano Alvarez, and Silang.

Two-term incumbent Roy Loyola, who was unopposed for re-election 2013, is seeking another term. Running against him is former Silang Mayor Ruben Madlansacay.

2016 Philippine House of Representatives election in Cavite 5th District.
Party	Candidate	Votes	%
Liberal	Roy Loyola	135,405	68.69
Nacionalista	Ruben Madlansacay	49,209	24.96
Invalid or blank votes		12,520	6.35
Total votes		197,134	100.00
Liberal hold			

=== 6th District ===
The 6th district is made up of the cities of General Trias, and Trece Martires as well as the municipalities of Amadeo, and Tanza.

First term incumbent Luis "Jon-Jon" Ferrer IV, who was elected with 68% of the vote in 2013, is seeking re-election unopposed.

2016 Philippine House of Representatives election in Cavite 6th District.
Party	Candidate	Votes	%
NUP	Luis "Jon-Jon" Ferrer IV	178,074	73.47
Invalid or blank votes		64,296	26.53
Total votes		242,370	100.00
NUP hold			

=== 7th District ===
The 7th district is composed of the city of Tagaytay and the municipalities of Alfonso, General Emilio Aguinaldo, Indang, Magallanes, Maragondon, Mendez, Naic, and Ternate.

First term incumbent Abraham Tolentino, who was elected with 54% of the vote in 2013, is running for a second term unopposed.

2016 Philippine House of Representatives election in Cavite 7th District.
Party	Candidate	Votes	%
Liberal	Abraham Tolentino	164,168	75.97
Invalid or blank votes		51,939	24.03
Total votes		216,107	100.00
Liberal hold			

== Laguna ==
=== 1st District ===
Laguna's 1st legislative district was previously composed of the cities of Biñan, Santa Rosa, and San Pedro. The district was redistricted by virtue of Republic Act 10658 which created a lone district for Biñan.

Incumbent Danilo Fernandez, who was re-elected with 75% of the vote in 2013, is barred by term limits from seeking re-election and is instead running for Mayor of Santa Rosa. His party, the Liberal Party, nominated incumbent Santa Rosa Mayor Arlene Arcillas who is running unopposed.

2016 Philippine House of Representatives election in Laguna's 1st District
Party	Candidate	Votes	%
Liberal	Arlene Arcillas-Nazareno	196,440	73.45
Invalid or blank votes		71,012	26.55
Total votes		267,452	100.00
Liberal hold			

=== 2nd District ===
The 2nd district is composed of the cities of Calamba, and Cabuyao as well as the municipalities of Los Baños and Bay.

Joaquin Chipeco, Jr., who was re-elected with 61% of the vote in 2013, is seeking another term unopposed.

2016 Philippine House of Representatives election in Laguna's 2nd District
Party	Candidate	Votes	%
Liberal	Joaquin Chipeco, Jr.	270,906	68.87
Invalid or blank votes		122,481	31.13
Total votes		393,387	100.00
Liberal hold			

=== 3rd District ===
The 3rd district is composed of San Pablo City, and the municipalities of Alaminos, Calauan, Liliw, Nagcarlan, Rizal, and Victoria.

First term incumbent Sol Aragones, who was elected with 51% of the vote in 2013, is seeking another term. Former San Pablo Mayor Florante Aquino, who represented this district from 1987 to 1998, is running against her. Also running is Damaso Amante of the Nationalist People's Coalition.

2016 Philippine House of Representatives election in Laguna's 3rd District
Party	Candidate	Votes	%
UNA	Sol Aragones	147,668	63.4
Liberal	Florante Aquino	39,222	16.9
NPC	Damaso Amante	19,215	8.3
Independent	Ma. Cristina Villamor	1,887	0.8
Invalid or blank votes		24,688	10.6
Total votes		232,680	100%
UNA hold			

=== 4th District ===
The 4th district is made up of the municipalities of Cavinti, Famy, Kalayaan, Luisiana, Lumban, Mabitac, Magdalena, Majayjay, Paete, Pagsanjan, Pakil, Pangil, Pila, Santa Cruz, Santa Maria, and Siniloan.

First term incumbent Benjamin Agarao Jr., who was elected with 46% of the vote in 2013, is seeking re-election. Former representative Edgar San Luis, who represented this district from 2007 to 2013 is running against him. Also running for the seat is independent candidate Fidel Santos. Agarao and San Luis previously faced each other to represent this district in 2007 in an election San Luis won.

2016 Philippine House of Representatives election in Laguna's 4th District
Party	Candidate	Votes	%
Liberal	Benjamin Agarao Jr.	137,760	52.4
NUP	Edgar San Luis	99,535	37.9
Independent	Fidel Santos	1,814	0.6
Invalid or blank votes		24,038	9.1
Total votes		262,747	100%
Liberal hold			

== Quezon ==
=== 1st District ===
Incumbent Wilfrido Mark Enverga is term limited. His sister, Trina is his party's nominee. Her opponents are former Congressman Irvin Alcala, Board Member Teresita Dator and former Vice Governor Carlos Portes.

2016 Philippine House of Representatives election in Quezon's 1st District
Party	Candidate	Votes	%
NPC	Trina Enverga	90,306	38.7
Liberal	Irvin Alcala	86,376	37.0
UNA	Teresita Dator	26,126	11.2
PDP–Laban	Carlos Portes	5,775	2.5
Invalid or blank votes		24,668	10.6
Total votes		233,251	100%
NPC hold			

=== 2nd District ===
Incumbent Vicente Alcala is running for reelection. His opponents are former Tiaong Mayor Vivencio Escueta and incumbent Sariaya Mayor Rosauro Masilang.

2016 Philippine House of Representatives election in Quezon's 2nd District
Party	Candidate	Votes	%
Liberal	Vicente Alcala	175,273	56.5
Independent	Rosauro Masilang	86,161	27.8
Independent	Vivencio Escueta	10,549	3.4
Invalid or blank votes		38,108	12.3
Total votes		310,091	100%
Liberal hold			

=== 3rd District ===
Incumbent Aleta Suarez is not running. She changed her party affiliation from Lakas to UNA. Her husband, former Congressman Danilo Suarez is her party's nominee and is running unopposed.

2016 Philippine House of Representatives election in Quezon's 3rd District
Party	Candidate	Votes	%
UNA	Danilo Suarez	124,963	65.8
Invalid or blank votes		64,915	34.2
Total votes		189,878	100%
UNA gain from Lakas			

=== 4th District ===
Angelina Tan is the incumbent and her main opponent is former Congressman Lorenzo Erin Tañada.

2016 Philippine House of Representatives election in Laguna's 4th District
Party	Candidate	Votes	%
NPC	Angelina Tan	127,590	
Liberal	Lorenzo Tañada III	53,101	
Independent	Manding Mendoza	1,537	
LM	Marcil Guay	203	
Invalid or blank votes		14,089	
Total votes		196,520	
NPC hold			

== Rizal ==
=== 1st District ===
Joel Roy R. Duavit is the incumbent but not running for reelection. His party nominated his brother and former congressman Michael John "Jack" Duavit.

2016 Philippine House of Representatives election in Rizal's 1st district
Party	Candidate	Votes	%
NPC	Michael John Duavit	246,141	
Independent	Avelino Zapanta	24,543	
Independent	Willfrido Naval	13,741	
Independent	Jerry Barbacena	4,635	
Independent	Titus Perez	8,825	
Invalid or blank votes		59,599	
Total votes		357,484	
NPC hold			

=== 2nd District ===
Isidro Rodriguez Jr. is the incumbent.

2016 Philippine House of Representatives election in Rizal's 2nd district
Party	Candidate	Votes	%
NPC	Isidro Rodriguez Jr.	220,209	
Independent	Luisa Ayuson	38,969	
Independent	Omar Mohammad Fajardo	19,792	
Independent	Said Usman	4,372	
Invalid or blank votes		100,827	
Total votes		384,169	
NPC hold			
