= 2019 Antipolo local elections =

Philippine election

2019 Antipolo mayoral election
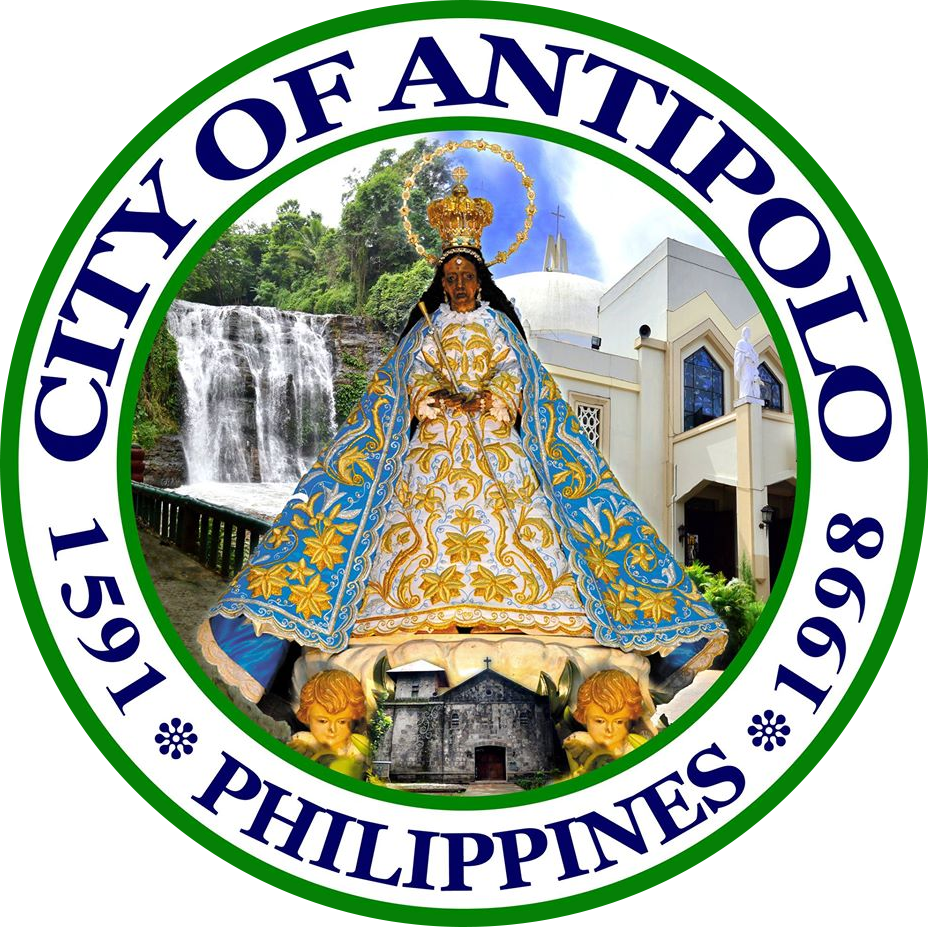
- May 13, 2019
Nominee	Andrea "Andeng" Bautista-Ynares
Party	NPC
Running mate	Josefina "Pining" Gatlabayan
Popular vote	235,548
Percentage	100.00
Mayor before election
Casimiro Ynares III
NPC
Elected mayor
Andrea Bautista-Ynares
NPC

Antipolo held its local elections on Monday, May 13, 2019, as a part of the 2019 Philippine general election. Voters elected candidates for the local elective posts in the city: the mayor, the vice mayor, the two district congressmen, the two provincial board members of Rizal (one for each district) and the sixteen councilors (eight for each district).

There are a total of 336,773 people who voted out of the 482,062 registered voters. Andrea Ynares and Josefina Gatlabayan won the elections undefeated as mayor and vice mayor (for the second time) respectively.

== Background ==
Incumbent Mayor Casimiro Ynares III won't ran for re-election. The one who ran in his place is her wife and brother of actor and Senator Bong Revilla, Andrea Bautista-Ynares. Bautista-Ynares ran unopposed.

Incumbent Vice Mayor Josefina "Pining" Gatlabayan ran for second term unopposed.

Incumbent First District Representative Chiqui Roa-Puno won't sought re-election. Her husband, former Representative Roberto Puno ran for her instead. Puno was challenged by Macario Aggarao.

Incumbent Second District Representative Romeo Acop was on his third and final term. His wife, Dr. Resureccion "Doktora Cion" Acop ran for his place unopposed.

Incumbent First District Board Member Enrico "Rico" De Guzman won't ran for re-election, instead he ran as councilor. The one who ran in his place is the son of former Representative Roberto "Robbie" Puno, Roberto Andres "Randy" Puno. Puno was challenged by Delfin Bacon, who withdrew his candidacy before election.

Incumbent Second District Board Member Atty. Jesus Angelito "Joel" Huertas Jr. is on third term. He ran as councilor instead. Former Councilor Alexander "Bobot" Marquez ran for his place instead. Marquez was challenged by Edelberto "Edel" Coronado.

== Results ==
=== For Mayor ===
Mayor Casimiro Ynares III is not running for re-election. His party nominated his wife, Andrea Bautista-Ynares. Bautista-Ynares won unopposed.

Antipolo mayoral election
Party	Candidate	Votes	%
NPC	Andrea "Andeng" Bautista-Ynares	235,548	100.00
Total votes		235,548	100.00
NPC hold			

=== For Vice Mayor ===
Vice Mayor Josefina "Pining" Gatlabayan won unopposed.

Antipolo vice mayoral election
Party	Candidate	Votes	%
NPC	Josefina "Pining" Gatlabayan	227,054	100.00
Total votes		227,054	100.00
NPC hold			

=== For Representative ===
==== First District ====
Former Rep. Roberto Puno won against Macario Aggarao.

2019 Philippine House of Representatives election in Antipolo's 1st district
Party	Candidate	Votes	%
NUP	Roberto Puno	107,140	93.01
Independent	Macario Aggarao	8,056	6.99
Total votes		115,196	100.00
NPC hold			

==== Second District ====
Dr. Resurreccion Acop won unopposed.

2019 Philippine House of Representatives election in Antipolo's 2nd district
Party	Candidate	Votes	%
NUP	Resurreccion Acop	127,695	100.00
Total votes		127,695	100.00
NUP hold			

=== For Board Member ===
==== First District ====
Roberto Andres "Randy" Puno, son of former Representative Roberto "Robbie" Puno won unopposed.

Antipolo 1st District Board Member election
Party	Candidate	Votes	%
NUP	Roberto Andres Puno Jr.	102,837	100.00
Total votes		102,837	100.00
NUP hold			

==== Second District ====
Former Councilor Alexander "Bobot" Marquez defeated Edelberto "Edel" Coronado.

Antipolo 2nd District Board Member election
Party	Candidate	Votes	%
NPC	Alexander Marquez	84,932	78.21
Independent	Edelberto Coronado	23,657	21.79
Total votes		108,589	100.00
NPC hold			

=== For City Councilors (by ticket) ===
With Ynares & Gatlabayan running unopposed, Team Ynares is the only ticket for this election.

==== Team Ynares ====
National Unity Party/Antipolo-1st District
Name	Party
Robert Altamirano Jr.	NUP
Arnel Camacho	NUP
Enrico De Guzman	NUP
Agnes Oldan	NUP
Philip Pimentel	NUP
Susan Garcia-Say	NUP
Christian Jay Tapales	NUP
Lemuel Marlowe Zapanta	NUP

Nationalist People's Coalition/Antipolo-2nd District
Name	Party
Philip Conrad Acop	NPC
Nixon Aranas	NPC
Jesus Angelito Huertas Jr.	NPC
Loni Leyva	NPC
Tony Masangkay	NPC
Edward O'Hara	NPC
Troadio Reyes	NPC
Irvin Paul Tapales	NPC

=== For City Councilors (by District) ===
==== First District ====
Antipolo City Council Election – 1st District
Party	Candidate	Votes	%
NUP	Enrico De Guzman	84,180	11.02
NUP	Susan Garcia-Say	81,809	10.71
NUP	Arnel Camacho	80,860	10.58
NUP	Christian Jay Tapales	79,820	10.45
NUP	Lemuel Marlowe Zapanta	78,028	10.21
NUP	Agnes Oldan	76,966	10.07
NUP	Robert Altamirano Jr.	76,249	9.98
NUP	Philip Pimentel	71,322	9.34
PDP–Laban	Lynn Alegre	37,644	4.93
PDP–Laban	Gil Tuyay	25,313	3.31
Independent	Rodolfo Magalona	20,944	2.74
Independent	Manuel Relorcasa	18,824	2.46
Independent	Neptali Nalog	16,242	2.13
Independent	Salvador Buenaobra, Jr.	15,816	2.07
Total votes		764,017	100.00

==== Second District ====
Antipolo City Council Election – 2nd District
Party	Candidate	Votes	%
NPC	Philip Conrad "Bong" Acop	124,407	14.95
NPC	Catalino Leyva	94,470	11.36
NPC	Irvin Paul Tapales	92,729	11.15
NPC	Jesus Angelito Huertas Jr.	84,060	10.10
NPC	Antonio Masangkay	83,156	10.00
NPC	Edward O'Hara	80,008	9.62
NPC	Nixon Aranas	74,043	8.90
Liberal	Alfred Zapanta	72,593	8.73
NPC	Troadio Reyes	71,365	8.58
PDP–Laban	Josefina Leyva-Villanueva	55,072	6.62
Total votes		831,903	100.00
