= Antipolo's at-large congressional district =

Legislative district of the Philippines

Antipolo's at-large congressional district was the lone congressional district of the Philippines in the city of Antipolo for the House of Representatives between 1998 and 2004. It was created after the passage of Republic Act No. 8508 in 1998 which converted Antipolo into a component city of Rizal following the 1995 census. The district was represented by Victor Sumulong for the entirety of its existence. He was redistricted into Antipolo's 2nd congressional district after the passage of Republic Act No. 9232 which abolished the district and reapportioned Antipolo into two congressional districts following the 2000 census.

== Representation history ==
#	Image	Member	Term of office		Congress	Party	Electoral history
#	Image	Member	Start	End	Congress	Party	Electoral history
=== Antipolo's at-large district for the House of Representatives of the Philippines ===
District created February 13, 1998 from Rizal's 1st district.
1		Victor Sumulong	June 30, 1998	June 30, 2004	11th	NPC	Elected in 1998.
1		Victor Sumulong	June 30, 1998	June 30, 2004	12th	LDP	Re-elected in 2001. Redistricted to the 2nd district.
District dissolved into Antipolo's 1st and 2nd districts.

== See also ==
- Legislative districts of Antipolo
