= Bong Acop =

Filipino politician and physician (born 1974)

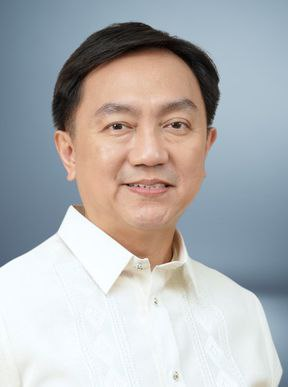
- Official portrait, 2026

Member of the Philippine House of Representatives from Antipolo's 2nd District
- Incumbent
- Assumed office March 16, 2026
- Preceded by: Romeo Acop

Member of the Antipolo City Council from the 2nd district
- In office June 30, 2013 – June 30, 2022

Personal details
- Born: Philip Conrad Marrero Acop; April 13, 1974 (age 52) Sampaloc, Manila, Philippines
- Party: NUP (2026–present)
- Other political affiliations: NPC (2018–2026); Liberal (2015–2018); Independent (2012–2015)
- Spouse: Jacqueline S. Acop
- Children: 3
- Parent(s): Romeo Acop (father); Resurreccion Acop (mother)
- Education: University of the Philippines Diliman (BS); University of the Philippines Manila (MD)
- Occupation: Politician and physician
- Profession: Pediatrician
- Nickname: Dok Bong

Philip Conrad "Dok Bong" Marrero Acop (born April 13, 1974) is a Filipino politician and pediatrician who is the current House Representative of Antipolo's 2nd congressional district since 2026, following his election through the 2026 Antipolo's 2nd congressional district special election. He previously served as a member of the Antipolo City Council from the same district from 2013 to 2022. He is the son of former representatives Romeo Acop and Resurreccion Acop.

== Early life and education ==
Philip Conrad Acop was born on April 13, 1974, in Sampaloc, Manila, Philippines to Romeo and Resurreccion Acop. He studied University of the Philippines Diliman with the degree of Psychology. He took up medicine at the University of the Philippines College of Medicine. He also took up a nutritional science course at Stanford University and Master in Public Management in Health Governance at the Ateneo School of Government.

== Physician career ==
A pediatrician by profession, Acop serves as a medical consultant for his family-owned Marrero-Acop Clinic and Hospital in Antipolo, as well as a visiting consultant at other hospitals. He is also the founding president of the Pakay: Yakap Foundation.

== Political career ==
=== Antipolo City Council (2013-2022) ===
Acop ran for a seat for the 2nd district in the Antipolo City Council in 2013 and won. He was re-elected in 2016 and in 2019, topping in both elections. As councilor, he chaired the city council's Committee on Health and Social Services, Committee on Senior Citizens, PWD & Veterans Affairs, and Committee on Agriculture. His term ended in 2022, as he was term-limited.

=== Congressional staff (2022–2026) ===
Acop served as Political Affairs Officer VI at the House of Representatives of the Philippines from 2022 to 2025. He later became the supervising legislative staff of the Commission on Appointments, where his father Romeo was a member, from 2025 to 2026.

=== House of Representatives (2026–present) ===
==== 2026 special election ====
Acop's father Romeo died on December 20, 2025, at the age of 78 due to a heart attack, this triggered a special election in his district that was to be held on March 14, 2026.

On February of that year, Acop filed his certificate of candidacy to replace his father under his late father's party, the National Unity Party. On March 2, 2026, Acop faced a disqualification case by a resident in Antipolo represented by lawyer Mark Tolentino over alleged massive vote buying, a Facebook page said that Acop was officially disqualified where the COMELEC had to step in and say that the post was "fake news" as they had not delivered a ruling of the case. Acop won in the election in a landslide defeating five other candidates including incumbent councilor Paui Tapales, businessman Red Llaga, and others. He was proclaimed as the official winner the next day.

==== Tenure ====
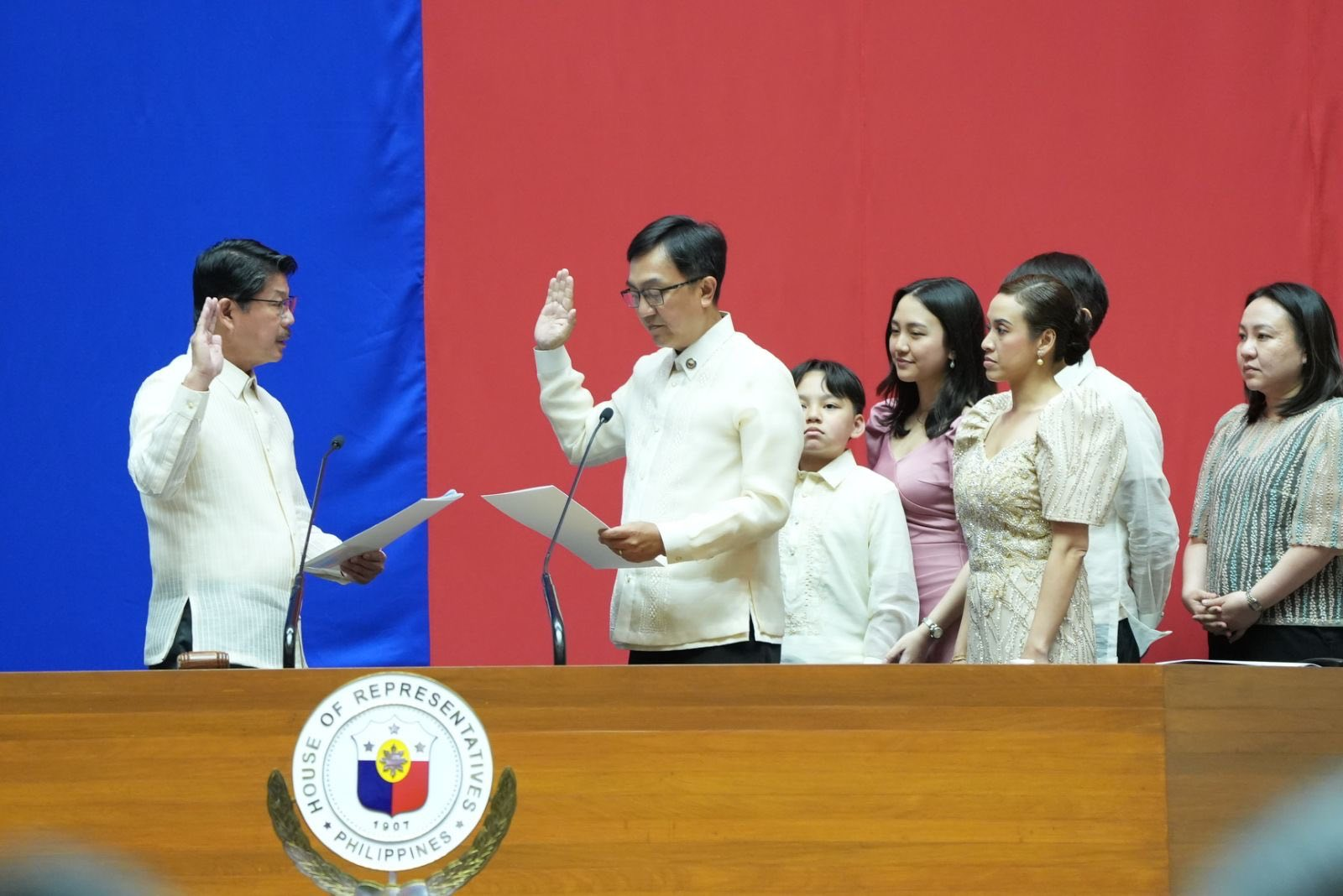
Acop (right) oathtaking as Antipolo's 2nd district representative at Batasang Pambansa on March 16, 2026.

He assumed office on March 16, 2026, with Antipolo Mayor Casimiro Ynares III and House Speaker Bojie Dy separately administering his oath taking.

Acop voted in favor of the second impeachment of Sara Duterte.

== Personal life ==
Acop is married to Jacqueline S. Acop.

== Electoral history ==
Electoral history of Bong Acop
Year	Office	Party	Votes received				Result
Year	Office	Party	Total	%	P.	Swing	Result
2013	Councilor (Antipolo–2nd)	Independent	57,127	—N/a	2nd	—N/a	Won
2016	Councilor (Antipolo–2nd)	Liberal	119,226	75.07%	1st	—N/a	Won
2019	Councilor (Antipolo–2nd)	NPC	124,407	14.95%	1st	-60.12%	Won
2026	Representative (Antipolo–2nd)	NUP	60,051	71.87%	1st	—N/a	Won
