= 2010 Philippine House of Representatives elections in Calabarzon =

District election in the Philippines in May 2010

Philippine House of Representatives elections in Calabarzon, 2010
- May 10, 2010

23 seats of Calabarzon in the House of Representatives
	First party	Second party	Third party
Party	Liberal	Lakas–Kampi	NPC
Seats won	8	6	4
Popular vote	1,271,706	1,227,366	1,097,152
Percentage	28.60%	27.60%	24.67%
	Fourth party	Fifth party
Party	Nacionalista	PMP
Seats won	3	1
Popular vote	516,685	99,586
Percentage	11.62%	2.24%
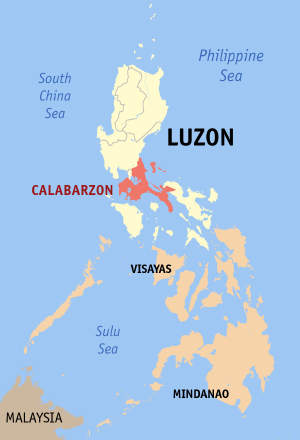
- Location of Calabarzon within the country.

Elections were held in Calabarzon for seats in the House of Representatives of the Philippines on May 10, 2010.

The candidate with the most votes won that district's seat for the 15th Congress of the Philippines.

== Summary ==
Party	Popular vote	%	Seats won
Liberal	1,271,706	28.60%	8
Lakas–Kampi	1,227,366	27.60%	6
NPC	1,097,152	24.67%	4
Nacionalista	516,685	11.62%	3
PMP	85,407	1.92%	1
Aksyon	33,678	0.89%	0
LM	8,790	0.20%	0
PGRP	1,564	0.04%	0
KBL	831	0.02%	0
Independent	197,687	4.45%	1
Valid votes	4,446,866	91.28%	23
Invalid votes	424,929	8.72%	
Turnout	4,871,795	71.95%	
Registered voters	6,771,139	100.00%	

== Batangas ==
=== 1st District ===
Incumbent Eileen Ermita-Buhain is in her third consecutive term and is ineligible to run; her father Eduardo is her party's nominee for the seat.

Eduardo Ermita placed the result of the election under protest in the House of Representatives Electoral Tribunal.

Candidate	Party	Votes	%
Tomas Apacible	Liberal Party	124,916	54.83
Eduardo Ermita	Lakas–Kampi–CMD	102,890	45.17
Total		227,806	100.00
Valid votes		227,806	91.71
Invalid/blank votes		20,600	8.29
Total votes		248,406	100.00
Liberal Party gain from Lakas–Kampi–CMD			
Source: Commission on Elections

=== 2nd District ===
Hermilando Mandanas is the incumbent.

Candidate	Party	Votes	%
Hermilando Mandanas (incumbent)	Liberal Party	155,516	63.32
Godofredo Berberabe	Lakas–Kampi–CMD	90,074	36.68
Total		245,590	100.00
Valid votes		245,590	99.54
Invalid/blank votes		1,147	0.46
Total votes		246,737	100.00
Liberal Party hold			
Source: Commission on Elections

=== 3rd District ===
Victoria Hernandez-Reyes is in her third consecutive term and is ineligible to run; her husband Rodrigo is her party's nominee for the seat.

The result of the election is under protest in the House of Representatives Electoral Tribunal.

Candidate	Party	Votes	%
Sonny Collantes	Pwersa ng Masang Pilipino	67,238	27.19
Cristeta Reyes	Liberal Party	60,375	24.42
Ma. Chona Dimayuga	Nationalist People's Coalition	52,387	21.19
Luis Carlos Laurel	Nacionalista Party	36,023	14.57
Rodrigo Reyes	Lakas–Kampi–CMD	22,457	9.08
Nicomedes Hernandez	Lapiang Manggagawa	8,790	3.55
Total		247,270	100.00
Valid votes		247,270	92.76
Invalid/blank votes		19,288	7.24
Total votes		266,558	100.00
Pwersa ng Masang Pilipino gain from Lakas–Kampi–CMD			
Source: Commission on Elections

=== 4th District ===
Mark Llandro Mendoza is the incumbent.

Candidate	Party	Votes	%
Mark Llandro Mendoza (incumbent)	Nationalist People's Coalition	248,491	94.60
Praxedes Bustamante	Independent	14,179	5.40
Total		262,670	100.00
Valid votes		262,670	87.70
Invalid/blank votes		36,848	12.30
Total votes		299,518	100.00
Nationalist People's Coalition hold			
Source: Commission on Elections

== Cavite ==
Cavite, the most populous province in the country according to the 2007 census, was reapportioned into seven districts from the original three. The province now has the most number of legislative districts among provinces and cities.

=== 1st District ===
Jun Abaya is the incumbent.

Candidate	Party	Votes	%
Jun Abaya (incumbent)	Liberal Party	75,408	55.37
Bernardo Paredes	Lakas–Kampi–CMD	58,780	43.16
Adel Dinero	Independent	2,009	1.48
Total		136,197	100.00
Valid votes		136,197	94.89
Invalid/blank votes		7,330	5.11
Total votes		143,527	100.00
Liberal Party hold			
Source: Commission on Elections

=== 2nd District ===
Candidate	Party	Votes	%
Lani Mercado	Lakas–Kampi–CMD	89,365	61.64
Plaridel Abaya	Liberal Party	55,088	38.00
Gerbie Ber Ado	Independent	518	0.36
Total		144,971	100.00
Valid votes		144,971	96.29
Invalid/blank votes		5,583	3.71
Total votes		150,554	100.00
Lakas–Kampi–CMD hold			
Source: Commission on Elections

=== 3rd District ===
Candidate	Party	Votes	%
Ayong Maliksi	Liberal Party	55,961	63.71
Albert Villaseca	Lakas–Kampi–CMD	28,651	32.62
Nelia Servida	Independent	2,398	2.73
Eric Cerojano	Kilusang Bagong Lipunan	831	0.95
Total		87,841	100.00
Valid votes		87,841	94.14
Invalid/blank votes		5,468	5.86
Total votes		93,309	100.00
Liberal Party gain from Nacionalista Party			
Source: Commission on Elections

=== 4th District ===
Elpidio Barzaga, Jr. is the incumbent, originally from the old 2nd district.

Candidate	Party	Votes	%
Elpidio Barzaga Jr.	Lakas–Kampi–CMD	163,766	91.68
Ramon Campos	Nacionalista Party	7,551	4.23
Fernando Campos	Independent	6,158	3.45
Editha Doroteo	Independent	1,162	0.65
Total		178,637	100.00
Valid votes		178,637	94.40
Invalid/blank votes		10,606	5.60
Total votes		189,243	100.00
Lakas–Kampi–CMD gain			
Source: Commission on Elections

=== 5th District ===
Candidate	Party	Votes	%
Roy Loyola	Liberal Party	83,813	53.31
Armando de Castro	Lakas–Kampi–CMD	73,404	46.69
Total		157,217	100.00
Valid votes		157,217	97.33
Invalid/blank votes		4,310	2.67
Total votes		161,527	100.00
Liberal Party gain			
Source: Commission on Elections

=== 6th District ===
Candidate	Party	Votes	%
Antonio Ferrer	Lakas–Kampi–CMD	108,574	62.21
Hermogenes Arayata Jr.	Liberal Party	63,951	36.64
Rosario Gonzales	Independent	2,000	1.15
Total		174,525	100.00
Valid votes		174,525	93.73
Invalid/blank votes		11,680	6.27
Total votes		186,205	100.00
Lakas–Kampi–CMD gain			
Source: Commission on Elections

=== 7th District ===
Candidate	Party	Votes	%
Jesus Crispin Remulla	Nacionalista Party	119,810	71.20
Laureano Mendoza	Liberal Party	48,454	28.80
Total		168,264	100.00
Valid votes		168,264	89.74
Invalid/blank votes		19,233	10.26
Total votes		187,497	100.00
Nacionalista Party gain			
Source: Commission on Elections

== Laguna ==
=== 1st District ===
Danilo Fernandez was originally elected during the 2007 election, but the House Electoral Tribunal ruled that his residence in the district was not enough and was disqualified; no replacement was named. Fernandez is running again for the district's seat this year.

Candidate	Party	Votes	%
Dan Fernandez (incumbent)	Lakas–Kampi–CMD	219,439	75.89
Uliran Joaquin	Nationalist People's Coalition	69,715	24.11
Total		289,154	100.00
Valid votes		289,154	94.82
Invalid/blank votes		15,783	5.18
Total votes		304,937	100.00
Lakas–Kampi–CMD hold			
Source: Commission on Elections

=== 2nd District ===
Timmy Chipeco is the incumbent.

The result of the election is under protest in the House of Representatives Electoral Tribunal.

Candidate	Party	Votes	%
Timmy Chipeco (incumbent)	Nacionalista Party	204,926	75.72
Severino Vergara	Independent	57,049	21.08
Rosauro Revilla	Independent	8,672	3.20
Total		270,647	100.00
Valid votes		270,647	90.06
Invalid/blank votes		29,867	9.94
Total votes		300,514	100.00
Nacionalista Party hold			
Source: Commission on Elections

=== 3rd District ===
Maria Evita Arago is the incumbent.

Candidate	Party	Votes	%
Maria Evita Arago (incumbent)	Liberal Party	123,638	61.64
Katherine Agapay	Nationalist People's Coalition	60,751	30.29
Florante Aquino	Independent	16,202	8.08
Total		200,591	100.00
Valid votes		200,591	94.85
Invalid/blank votes		10,895	5.15
Total votes		211,486	100.00
Liberal Party hold			
Source: Commission on Elections

=== 4th District ===
Edgar San Luis is the incumbent and is running unopposed.

Candidate	Party	Votes	%
Edgar San Luis (incumbent)	Nationalist People's Coalition	181,930	100.00
Total		181,930	100.00
Valid votes		181,930	77.76
Invalid/blank votes		52,023	22.24
Total votes		233,953	100.00
Nationalist People's Coalition hold			
Source: Commission on Elections

== Quezon ==
=== 1st District ===
Wilfrido Mark Enverga is the incumbent.

Devanadera placed the result of the election under protest in the House of Representatives Electoral Tribunal.

Candidate	Party	Votes	%
Mark Enverga (incumbent)	Nacionalista Party	109,508	56.20
Agnes Devanadera	Lakas–Kampi–CMD	82,908	42.55
Gregorio Cabigan	Philippine Green Republican Party	1,564	0.80
Rolando de Tena	Independent	861	0.44
Total		194,841	100.00
Valid votes		194,841	92.62
Invalid/blank votes		15,536	7.38
Total votes		210,377	100.00
Nacionalista Party hold			
Source: Commission on Elections

=== 2nd District ===
Incumbent Proceso Alcala decided not to seek reelection; his son Irvin is his party's nominee for the seat.

Candidate	Party	Votes	%
Irvin Alcala	Liberal Party	170,760	74.51
James Rey Bico	Nacionalista Party	40,260	17.57
Bernard Tagarao	Pwersa ng Masang Pilipino	18,169	7.93
Total		229,189	100.00
Valid votes		229,189	90.78
Invalid/blank votes		23,281	9.22
Total votes		252,470	100.00
Liberal Party hold			
Source: Commission on Elections

=== 3rd District ===
Danilo Suarez is the incumbent.

Candidate	Party	Votes	%
Danilo Suarez (incumbent)	Lakas–Kampi–CMD	112,687	79.69
Eduardo Rodriguez	Liberal Party	27,790	19.65
Rebecca de la Rosa	Independent	924	0.65
Total		141,401	100.00
Valid votes		141,401	89.46
Invalid/blank votes		16,662	10.54
Total votes		158,063	100.00
Lakas–Kampi–CMD hold			
Source: Commission on Elections

=== 4th District ===
Incumbent Erin Tañada is running unopposed.

Candidate	Party	Votes	%
Erin Tañada (incumbent)	Liberal Party	148,226	100.00
Total		148,226	100.00
Valid votes		148,226	84.88
Invalid/blank votes		26,398	15.12
Total votes		174,624	100.00
Liberal Party hold			
Source: Commission on Elections

== Rizal ==
=== 1st District ===
Incumbent Jack Duavit is in his third consecutive term already and is not eligible for reelection; Joel Duavit will run as his party's nominee in the district.

Candidate	Party	Votes	%
Joel Duavit	Nationalist People's Coalition	207,300	75.81
Joaquin Mendoza	Aksyon Demokratiko	39,678	14.51
Wilfrido Naval	Independent	20,122	7.36
Paulino Cruz	Independent	6,362	2.33
Total		273,462	100.00
Valid votes		273,462	87.10
Invalid/blank votes		40,500	12.90
Total votes		313,962	100.00
Nationalist People's Coalition hold			
Source: Commission on Elections

=== 2nd District ===
Incumbent Adeline Rodriguez-Zaldarriaga is not running; Isidro Rodriguez, Jr. will run as her party's nominee in the district.

Candidate	Party	Votes	%
Isidro Rodriguez Jr.	Nationalist People's Coalition	223,575	80.66
Alberto Carasco	Liberal Party	53,623	19.34
Total		277,198	100.00
Valid votes		277,198	86.87
Invalid/blank votes		41,891	13.13
Total votes		319,089	100.00
Nationalist People's Coalition hold			
Source: Commission on Elections

=== Antipolo ===
Antipolo is a component city of Rizal.

==== 1st District ====
Roberto Puno is the incumbent.

Candidate	Party	Votes	%
Roberto Puno (incumbent)	Lakas–Kampi–CMD	67,500	62.08
Ricardo Dapat	Nationalist People's Coalition	37,546	34.53
Florante Quizon	Independent	1,381	1.27
Primer Pagunuran	Independent	1,202	1.11
Salvador Raldy Abaño	Independent	1,095	1.01
Total		108,724	100.00
Valid votes		108,724	91.99
Invalid/blank votes		9,472	8.01
Total votes		118,196	100.00
Lakas–Kampi–CMD hold			
Source: Commission on Elections

==== 2nd District ====
Incumbent Angelito Gatlabayan is running for mayor of Antipolo.

Candidate	Party	Votes	%
Romeo Acop	Independent	32,281	31.36
Lorenzo Sumulong III	Liberal Party	24,907	24.20
Jestoni Alarcon	Independent	20,159	19.59
Federico Marquez	Independent	15,057	14.63
Lorenzo Zapanta	Lakas–Kampi–CMD	6,961	6.76
Marcelino Arellano	Independent	2,924	2.84
Hoover Simbillo	Independent	374	0.36
Virginia Mendoza	Independent	262	0.25
Total		102,925	100.00
Valid votes		102,925	93.26
Invalid/blank votes		7,441	6.74
Total votes		110,366	100.00
Independent gain from Lakas–Kampi–CMD			
Source: Commission on Elections
