= Antipolo's 2nd congressional district =

House of Representatives of the Philippines legislative district

- Constituency for the House of Representatives of the Philippines
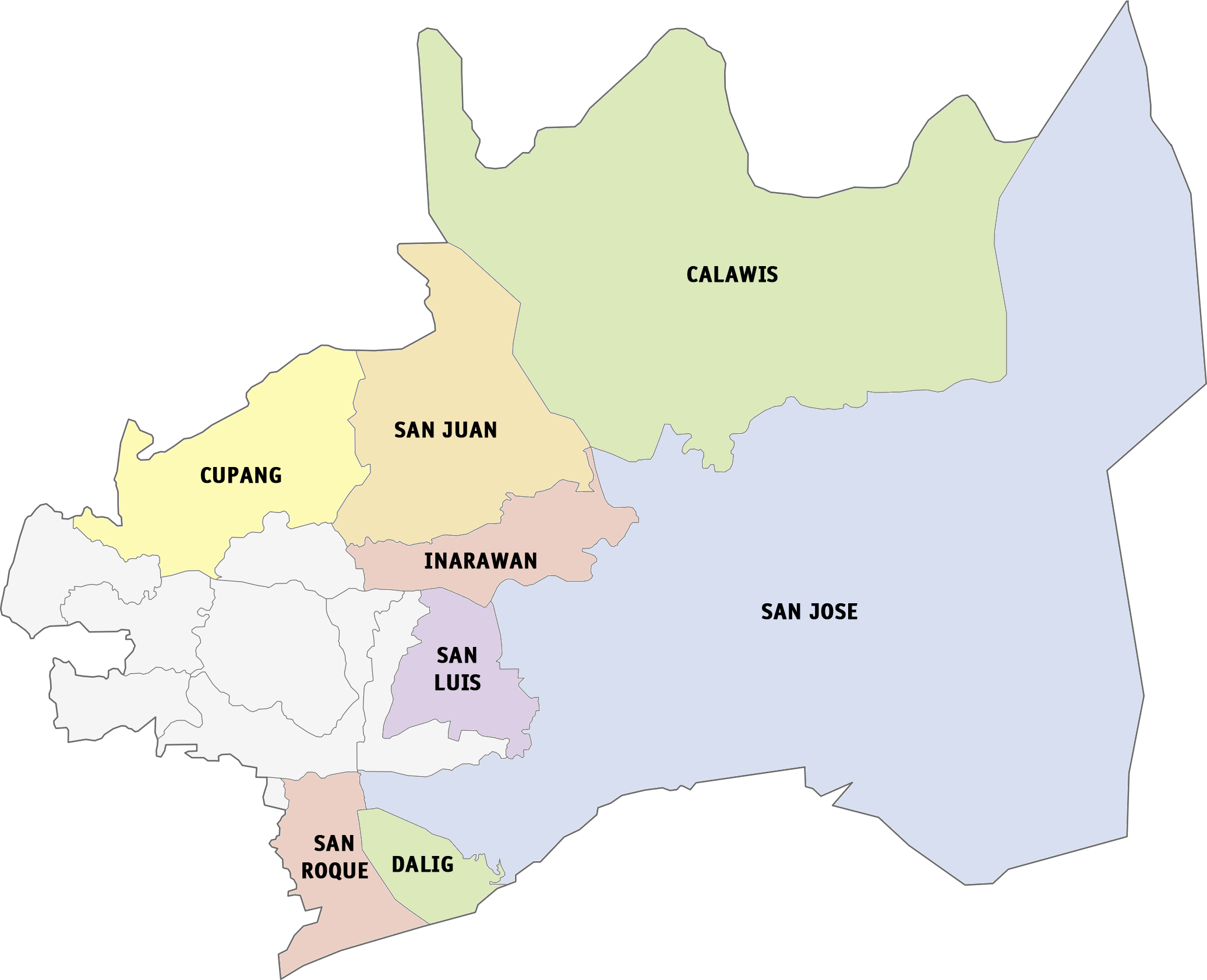
- Boundary of Antipolo's 2nd congressional district in Antipolo

- Location of Antipolo within the province of Rizal
- City: Antipolo
- Province: Rizal, Calabarzon
- Population: 507,831 (2020)
- Electorate: 256,180 (2022)
- Major settlements: 8 barangays: Calawis; Cupang; Dalig; Inarawan; San Jose; San Juan; San Luis; San Roque
- Area: 258.57 km^{2} (99.83 sq mi)

Current constituency
- Created: 2003
- Representative: Bong Acop
- Political party: NUP

Antipolo's 2nd congressional district is one of the two congressional districts of the Philippines in the city of Antipolo and one of six in the province of Rizal. It has been represented in the House of Representatives of the Philippines since 2004. The district consists of the eastern Antipolo barangays of Calawis, Cupang, Dalig, Inarawan, San Jose, San Juan, San Luis and San Roque. It is currently represented in the 20th Congress by Bong Acop of the National Unity Party (NUP).

== Representation history ==
#	Image	Member	Term of office		Congress	Party	Electoral history	Constituent LGUs
#	Image	Member	Start	End	Congress	Party	Electoral history	Constituent LGUs
=== Antipolo's 2nd district for the House of Representatives of the Philippines ===
District created December 22, 2003.
1		Victor Sumulong	June 30, 2004	June 30, 2007	13th	Lakas	Redistricted from Antipolo's at-large district and re-elected in 2004.	2004–present Calawis, Cupang, Dalig, Inarawan, San Jose, San Juan, San Luis, San Roque
2		Angelito Gatlabayan	June 30, 2007	June 30, 2010	14th	Lakas	Elected in 2007.	2004–present Calawis, Cupang, Dalig, Inarawan, San Jose, San Juan, San Luis, San Roque
3		Romeo Acop	June 30, 2010	June 30, 2019	15th	Independent	Elected in 2010.	2004–present Calawis, Cupang, Dalig, Inarawan, San Jose, San Juan, San Luis, San Roque
3		Romeo Acop	June 30, 2010	June 30, 2019	16th	Liberal	Re-elected in 2013.	2004–present Calawis, Cupang, Dalig, Inarawan, San Jose, San Juan, San Luis, San Roque
3		Romeo Acop	June 30, 2010	June 30, 2019	17th	PDP–Laban	Re-elected in 2016.	2004–present Calawis, Cupang, Dalig, Inarawan, San Jose, San Juan, San Luis, San Roque
4		Resurreccion Acop	June 30, 2019	May 28, 2021	18th	NUP	Elected in 2019. Died.	2004–present Calawis, Cupang, Dalig, Inarawan, San Jose, San Juan, San Luis, San Roque
(3)		Romeo Acop	June 30, 2022	December 20, 2025	19th	NUP	Elected in 2022.	2004–present Calawis, Cupang, Dalig, Inarawan, San Jose, San Juan, San Luis, San Roque
(3)		Romeo Acop	June 30, 2022	December 20, 2025	20th	NUP	Re-elected in 2025. Died.	2004–present Calawis, Cupang, Dalig, Inarawan, San Jose, San Juan, San Luis, San Roque
5		Bong Acop	March 16, 2026	Incumbent	20th	NUP	Elected in 2026 to finish his father's term.	2004–present Calawis, Cupang, Dalig, Inarawan, San Jose, San Juan, San Luis, San Roque

== Election results ==
=== 2026 special ===
2026 Antipolo's 2nd congressional district special election
Candidate	Party	Votes	%	+/–
Bong Acop	National Unity Party	60,051	71.87	−28.13
Red Llaga	Independent	12,054	14.43	N/A
Paui Tapales	Independent	10,080	12.06	N/A
Nat Lobigas	Independent	754	0.90	N/A
Dan Infante	Independent	412	0.49	N/A
Baby Cafirma	Independent	199	0.24	N/A
Total		83,550	100.00	–
Valid votes		83,550	99.03	+24.25
Invalid/blank votes		817	0.97	−24.25
Total votes		84,367	100.00	–
Registered voters/turnout		252,793	33.37	−39.27
National Unity Party hold				

=== 2025 ===
2025 Philippine House of Representatives elections
Party	Candidate	Votes	%
NUP	Romeo Acop	131,925	100.00
Total votes		131,925	100.00
NUP hold			

=== 2022 ===
2022 Philippine House of Representatives elections
Party	Candidate	Votes	%
NUP	Romeo Acop	132,519	100.00
Total votes		132,519	100.00
NUP hold			

=== 2019 ===
2019 Philippine House of Representatives elections
Party	Candidate	Votes	%
NUP	Resurreccion Acop	127,695	100.00
Total votes		127,695	100.00
NUP gain from PDP–Laban			

=== 2016 ===
2016 Philippine House of Representatives elections
Party	Candidate	Votes	%
Liberal	Romeo Acop	128,309	80.79%
Invalid or blank votes		30,504	19.21%
Turnout		158,813	67.83%
Registered electors		234,132	
Liberal hold			

=== 2013 ===
2013 Philippine House of Representatives elections
Party	Candidate	Votes	%	±%
Liberal	Romeo Acop	74,109	61.79	+ 30.43
PDP–Laban	Lorenzo Juan Sumulong III	44,612	37.20	+ 13.0
Independent	Silverio Bulanon	1,217	1.01	
Margin of victory		29,497	24.59	

=== 2010 ===
2010 Philippine House of Representatives elections
Party	Candidate	Votes	%
Independent	Romeo Acop	32,281	31.36
Liberal	Lorenzo Juan Sumulong III	24,907	24.20
Independent	Jestoni Alarcon	20,159	19.59
NPC	Federico Marquez	15,057	14.63
Lakas–Kampi	Lorenzo Zapanta	6,961	6.76
Independent	Marcelino Arellano	2,924	2.84
Independent	Hoover Simbillo	374	0.36
Independent	Virginia Mendoza	262	0.25
Valid ballots		102,925	93.26
Invalid or blank votes		7,441	6.74
Total votes		110,366	100.00
Independent gain from Lakas–Kampi			

== See also ==
- Legislative districts of Antipolo
