= Ronald Barcena =

Filipino politician (born 1975)

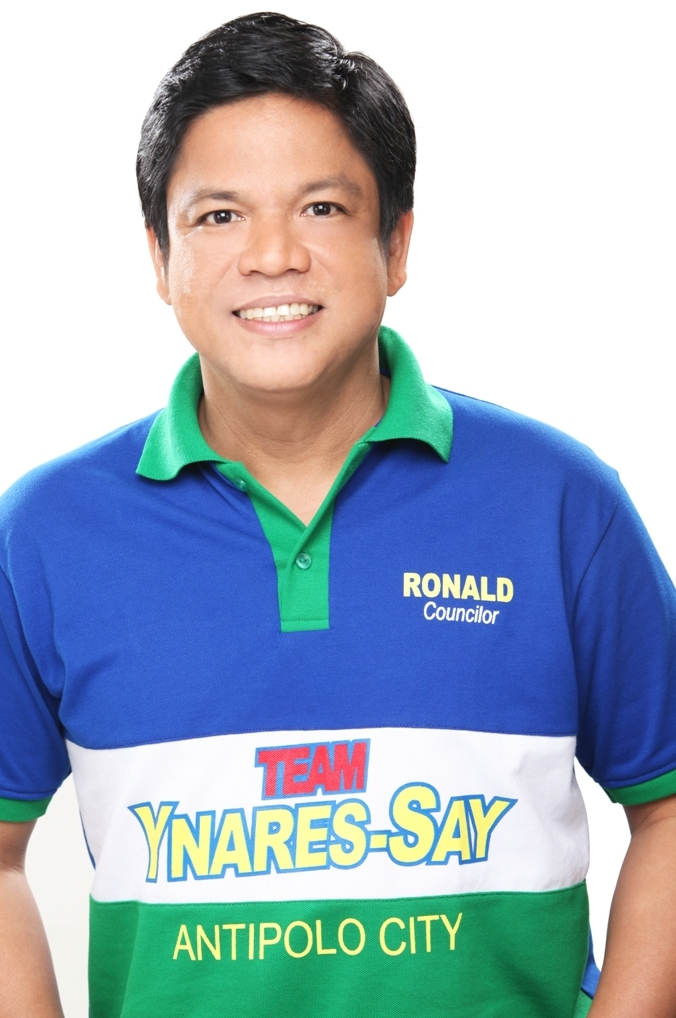

Member of Rizal Provincial Board from the 1st district
- In office June 30, 2010 – June 30, 2013
- Preceded by: Arnel Camacho
- Succeeded by: Dr. Enrico C. De Guzman

Member of Antipolo City Council from the 1st district
- In office June 30, 2001 – June 30, 2009
- In office June 30, 2013 – January 2018

Sangguniang Kabataan President, Antipolo
- In office 1996–2001
- Succeeded by: Christian Edward O. Alarcon

Sangguniang Kabataan Chairman, Barangay Bagong Nayon, Antipolo
- In office 1993–1996

Sangguniang Kabataan Kagawad, Barangay Bagong Nayon, Antipolo
- In office 1992–1993

Personal details
- Born: June 3, 1974 (age 51)
- Party: Nationalist People's Coalition
- Profession: Politician

Ronald R. Barcena (born June 3, 1975) is a Filipino politician. A member of the NPC party, he was elected as a Member of the Sangguniang Panlalawigan of Rizal Province, representing the 1st District of Antipolo, beginning in 2010. Prior to his election to Rizal Province, Barcena was elected to three terms as Councilor and Sangguniang Kabataan President of Antipolo.

House of Representatives of the Philippines
Preceded by Arnel Camacho	Board Member, 26th Sangguniang Panlalawigan ng Rizal, 1st District of Antipolo; 2009–present	Succeeded by Incumbent
