= Resurreccion Acop =

Filipino politician and doctor (1947–2021)

The Honorable Resurreccion Acop M.D.

Member of the Philippine House of Representatives from Antipolo's 2nd district
- In office June 30, 2019 – May 28, 2021
- Preceded by: Romeo Acop
- Succeeded by: Romeo Acop

Personal details
- Born: November 21, 1947 Baguio, Benguet, Philippines
- Died: May 28, 2021 (aged 73) San Juan, Metro Manila, Philippines
- Cause of death: COVID-19
- Party: National Unity Party
- Spouse: Romeo Acop
- Children: 3, including Bong
- Occupation: Politician
- Profession: Pediatrician

Resurreccion "Cion" Marrero Acop (November 21, 1947 – May 28, 2021) was a Filipino politician and medical doctor who specialized in pediatrics. She served as a member of the House of Representatives, representing the 2nd district of Antipolo, from 2019 until her death in 2021.

== Political career ==
During her stint in the 18th Congress, she was the vice chairperson of the House Committee on Health and member of the Committees on Agriculture and Food, Basic Education and Culture, Inter-parliamentary Relations And Diplomacy, Public Order And Safety, Public Works And Highways, and Welfare Of Children. She was also a member of the House of Representatives Electoral Tribunal.

== Personal life ==
Acop's husband, former police general Romeo Acop, served in the same seat from 2010 until 2019 and again from 2022 until his death in 2025. The family owns the Marrero-Acop Clinic and Hospital in Antipolo.

== Death ==
Acop died of complications from COVID-19 on May 28, 2021, at the age of 73.

Upon her death, the seat remained vacant until her husband was elected unopposed a year later. He, too, would later die in office in 2025, thus making them the first wife and husband to both die while serving in Congress.
