= Legislative districts of Antipolo =

Legislative district of the Philippines

The legislative districts of Antipolo are the representations of the component city of Antipolo in the Congress of the Philippines. The city is currently represented in the lower house of Congress through its first and second congressional districts.

== History ==
Antipolo was initially represented as part of the at-large district of Morong in the Malolos Congress from 1898 to 1899. The then-town was later incorporated to the province of Rizal, established in 1901, and was represented as part of the second district of Rizal from 1907 to 1941 and from 1945 to 1972. During World War II, it was represented as part of the at-large district of Rizal in the National Assembly of the Second Philippine Republic from 1943 to 1944. Antipolo, along with the rest of the province of Rizal, was represented in the Interim Batasang Pambansa as part of Region IV-A from 1978 to 1984. The province of Rizal elected two representatives at-large to the Regular Batasang Pambansa in 1984.

Antipolo was placed in the first district of Rizal after the reorganization of the province's legislative districts under the new Constitution which was proclaimed on February 11, 1987. Upon its conversion into a city through Republic Act No. 8508 (approved on February 13, 1998; ratified on April 4, 1998), Antipolo was separated from the first district of Rizal and elected its own representative starting in the 1998 elections.

The city was further divided into two congressional districts on December 22, 2003, by virtue of Republic Act No. 9232; each elected their own representative beginning in 2004. However the city's residents still vote as part of the province's 1st and 2nd Sangguniang Panlalawigan districts for the purpose of electing Provincial Board members.

On October 8, 2025, Antipolo Representatives Romeo Acop and Ronaldo Puno filed House Bill No. 5303, which seeks to create the third district of Antipolo, citing population growth in the city. The third district would consist of barangays Beverly Hills, Dela Paz, San Isidro, and Santa Cruz from the first district and barangay San Luis from the second district. In February 2026, the bill was substituted by House Bill No. 7805 and remains pending with the House Committee on Rules.

== Senatorial representation ==
Between 1916 and 1935, the then-municipality of Antipolo, under the province of Rizal, was represented in the Senate of the Philippines through the 4th senatorial district of the Philippine Islands. However, in 1935, all senatorial districts were abolished when a unicameral National Assembly was installed under a new constitution following the passage of the Tydings–McDuffie Act, which established the Commonwealth of the Philippines. Since the 1941 elections, when the Senate was restored after a constitutional plebiscite, all twenty-four members of the upper house have been elected countrywide at-large.

== Congressional representation ==
Antipolo has been represented in the lower house of various Philippine national legislatures since 1998, through its lone congressional district from 1998 to 2004, and first and second congressional districts from 2004 to present.

== Current districts and representatives ==
Political parties

National Unity Party (2)

Legislative districts and congressional representatives of Antipolo
District	Current representative	Party	Constituent Barangays	Population (2015)	Area	Map
1st	Ronaldo V. Puno (since 2025); Dela Paz	NUP	List: Bagong Nayon; Beverly Hills; De La Paz; Mambugan; Mayamot; Munting Dilao; San Isidro; Santa Cruz	358,156	35.15 km²	
2nd	Philip Conrad M. Acop (since 2026); San Roque	NUP	List: Calawis; Cupang; Dalig; Inarawan; San Jose; San Juan; San Luis; San Roque	418,230	258.57 km²	

== See also ==
- Legislative districts of Rizal
