= Romeo Acop =

Filipino lawyer, politician and police officer (1947–2025)

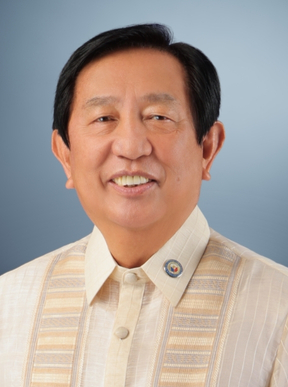
- Official portrait, 2025

Member of the Philippine House of Representatives from Antipolo's 2nd district
- In office June 30, 2022 – December 20, 2025
- Preceded by: Resurreccion Acop
- Succeeded by: Bong Acop
- In office June 30, 2010 – June 30, 2019
- Preceded by: Angelito Gatlabayan
- Succeeded by: Resurreccion Acop

Personal details
- Born: Romeo Macusi Acop; March 11, 1947 Sudipen, La Union, Philippines
- Died: December 20, 2025 (aged 78) Antipolo, Rizal, Philippines
- Party: NUP (2021–2025)
- Other political affiliations: PDP–Laban (2017–2021); Liberal (2012–2017); Independent (2009–2012)
- Spouse: Resurreccion "Cion" Marrero (died 2021)
- Children: 3 (including Bong)
- Education: Philippine Military Academy (BS); José Rizal University (LL.B)
- Occupation: Politician
- Profession: Lawyer; police officer

Military service
- Branch: Philippine Constabulary
- Service years: 1970–1991
- Police career
- Service: Philippine National Police
- Divisions: CISC / CIDG; Directorate for Comptrollership
- Service years: 1991–2001
- Rank: Chief superintendent

Romeo Macusi Acop (March 11, 1947 – December 20, 2025) was a Filipino police officer, lawyer, and politician who served as the representative for Antipolo's second district from 2010 to 2019, and again in 2022 until his death in 2025.

Educated at the Philippine Military Academy, Acop served as chief superintendent of the Criminal Investigation Service from 1994 until his resignation in 1995 following the Kuratong Baleleng rubout. He entered Congress in 2010 and served three full terms before being succeeded by his wife, Resurreccion. Following her death, he returned to Congress and served another two terms until his death in 2025.

He and his wife, who had also died in office four years prior, were the first husband and wife to both die while serving in Congress.

== Early life and education ==
Romeo Macusi Acop was born on March 11, 1947 in Sudipen, La Union. Acop attended the Philippine Military Academy, graduating in the 1970 Magiting batch with Hermogenes E. Ebdane, Jr., a Governor of Zambales. He then studied law at the José Rizal University, graduating cum laude in 1986.

== Police career ==
Acop then served in the Philippine National Police as chief of Criminal Investigation Service (CIS, now CIDG) from 1994 to 1995 with the rank of Chief Superintendent, which was equivalent to a brigadier general, during the Ramos government. He resigned as CIS in 1995 due to the Kuratong Baleleng rubout. In response to the resignation of Director General Panfilo Lacson as PNP Chief in January 2001, Acop, with two other prominent police officers, resigned their posts. By 2002, the CIDG reviewed the case against him due to the Dacer–Corbito double murder case.

== Congressional career ==
=== Elections ===
Acop was first elected as the representative of Antipolo's second district to the House of Representatives of the Philippines in the 2010 election. He defeated eight competitors, including former Rizal Vice Governor Jestoni Alarcon, with a plurality of 31.36% of the vote. He sought reelection in the 2013 election, winning in a landslide against Councilor Lorenzo Sumulong III. In the 2016 election, he ran for reelection unopposed.

Acop was term-limited by the 2019 election, and his wife, Resurreccion, ran to succeed him, winning the race unopposed. Resurrection died in 2021, creating a vacancy that lasted until the 2022 election. In that election, Acop ran to reclaim the seat, being elected unopposed. In the 2025 election, he won reelection to the seat without contest.

=== Tenure ===
Acop's Commission on Appointments portrait for the 20th Congress

Acop and AGHAM Partylist Representative Angelo Palmones filed a resolution to conduct an inquiry into the acquisition of 59,904 9-millimeter pistols for the Philippine National Police, which would cost around ₱1.2 billion. He was one of the 56 representatives in the 16th Congress of the Philippines (out of 290 members) with a perfect attendance record.

During a House inquiry into Vice President Sara Duterte's confidential funds in 2024, Acop flagged the name "Mary Grace Piattos", sharing the monikers of a restaurant chain and a potato chip brand, as an allegedly fictitious signatory on an acknowledgement receipt for confidential expenses.

== Illness and death ==
On November 28, 2025, Acop was discharged after receiving a kidney transplant. He was found unconscious at his residence on December 20, and later died at the Assumption Specialty Hospital and Medical Center in Antipolo, at the age of 78, following a heart attack. His remains were cremated and then brought to the Batasang Pambansa for a requiem mass and memorial service for him on December 29. His death triggered a special election in his constituency scheduled on March 14, 2026. His son Philip Conrad "Bong" won the election in a landslide.

== Electoral history ==
Electoral history of Romeo Acop
Year	Office	Party	Votes received				Result
Year	Office	Party	Total	%	P.	Swing	Result
2010	Representative (Antipolo–2nd)	Independent	32,281	31.36%	1st	—N/a	Won
2013	Representative (Antipolo–2nd)	Liberal	74,109	61.79%	1st	—N/a	Won
2016	Representative (Antipolo–2nd)	Liberal	128,309	80.79%	1st	—N/a	Unopposed
2022	Representative (Antipolo–2nd)	NUP	132,896	100.00%	1st	—N/a	Unopposed
2025	Representative (Antipolo–2nd)	NUP	131,925	100.00%	1st	—N/a	Unopposed

House of Representatives of the Philippines
Preceded by Resurreccion Acop	Representative, 2nd District of Antipolo City; 2022–2025; 2010–2019	Succeeded by Bong Acop
Preceded by Angelito Gatlabayan	Representative, 2nd District of Antipolo City; 2022–2025; 2010–2019	Succeeded by Resurreccion Acop
