= National Unity Party (Philippines) =

Conservative political party in the Philippines

- Abbreviation: NUP
- President: Vacant
- Chairman: Ronaldo Puno
- Secretary-General: Reginald Velasco
- Founder: Pablo P. Garcia
- Founded: December 7, 2010
- Registered: October 5, 2011
- Split from: Lakas–Kampi–CMD; Kampi
- Headquarters: Suite 907, 9/F, NLIC Building, 6762 Ayala Avenue, Makati, 1226 Metro Manila
- Ideology: Christian democracy Social conservatism
- Political position: Centre-right
- National affiliation: Bagong Pilipinas (since 2024); TRoPa (2021–2022); Coalition For Change (2016–2021); Team PNoy (2013)
- Colors: Green
- Slogan: One Nation, One Future
- Senate: 0 / 24
- House of Representatives: 55 / 318
- Provincial Governors: 10 / 82
- Provincial Vice Governors: 6 / 82
- Provincial Board Members: 73 / 840

Website
- nup.org.ph

The National Unity Party (NUP; Filipino: Partido ng Pambansang Pagkakaisa) is a political party in the Philippines. The party was formed in 2010 by former members of Lakas–Kampi who broke away after internal discontent within the party. From 2016 to 2022, the party was part of the PDP–Laban-led coalition in the House of Representatives, the Coalition for Change.

The party was accredited by the Commission of Elections as a national party in a resolution dated October 5, 2011.

On September 26, 2012, the party held its first national convention where they announced support for Team PNoy for the 2013 elections, however most NUP members ultimately supported the United Nationalist Alliance, especially Garcia.

== History ==
=== Formation and early years ===
After the merger of Kabalikat ng Malayang Pilipino (KAMPI) founded by President Gloria Macapagal Arroyo and led by Ronnie Puno and Pabling Garcia into ruling party Lakas–CMD (Lakas) in mid-2008. The merger's primary goal is to ensure the dominance and victory of all pro-Arroyo and her allies in 2010 national elections, with 200 national and 8,000 local officials. On September 30, 2009, the party merger was approved by COMELEC.

But, by 2009 the newly merged party was raided by opposition bets from Nacionalista and Liberal to strengthen their legislative force for the 2010 elections.

In 2011, Garcia and Puno and their supporters broke away from Lakas to found the National Unity Party (NUP). NUP's initiative is to support Liberal President Benigno Aquino III.

=== 2025 ===
In 2025 Speakership election, Congressman Duke Frasco from Cebu was removed from the party due to non-signing of manifesto which affirms support for incumbent Speaker Martin Romualdez.

Months later, on September 10, 2025, Congressman Kiko Barzaga from Cavite left the party after he was supposedly accused by Deputy Speaker and party chairman Ronaldo Puno that he solicited signatures to remove House Speaker Martin Romualdez, a claim which Barzaga denied. He also left the majority bloc and being an assistant majority leader to join the minority.

Ronnie Puno, the chairman led the NUP on September 15, 2025, on its intent to file an ethics complaint against Kiko Barzaga, citing four possible violations: failing to reflect creditably on the House, engaging in unlawful and immoral acts, inciting seditious activity, and conduct unbecoming of a member of Congress. Evidence presented in the ethics complain include Barzaga posting lewd photos with scantily clad women and him making ostentatious display of wealth by holding bundles of cash.

On December 1, Barzaga was suspended for 60 days due to reckless behavior from his posts on social media. The adoption of the ethics committee recommendation against Barzaga was voted in favor by 249 House of Representatives members, five voted against, and 11 abstained.

On December 20, NUP stalwart, Congressman Romeo Acop of Antipolo died of heart complications, triggering a special election scheduled on March 14, 2026.

=== 2026 ===
Romeo Acop's son Bong, also a member of the NUP won the special election in a landslide succeeding his late father.

== Ideology and positions ==
According to the party's constitution, NUP's principles include the following: belief in God; sovereignty of the state, national interest and democracy; social justice and responsibility; and environmental awareness.

== Party leadership ==
- Chairman: Ronaldo V. Puno
- Vice-chairman for External Affairs: Vacant
- Vice-chairman for Internal Affairs: Secretary Jesus Crispin Remulla
- National President: Rep. Luis Raymund Villafuerte, 1st District of Camarines Sur
- Vice President for Luzon: Rep. Lorna Silverio, 3rd District of Bulacan
- Vice President for Visayas: Rep. Pablo John Garcia, 3rd District of Cebu
- Vice President for Mindanao: Rep. Adolph Edward G. Plaza, 2nd District of Agusan Del Sur
- Secretary-General: Rep. Albert Raymond S. Garcia, 2nd District of Bataan
- Treasurer: Rep. Antonio A. Ferrer, 6th District of Cavite

== List of party chairmen ==
- Pablo P. Garcia (2011–2013)
- Ronaldo Puno (2013–present)

== Elected members ==
=== 20th Congress (2025–present) ===
==== District Representatives ====
District Representatives of NUP in 2025
Name	District	Took office
Joseph Bernos	Abra's-at large congressional district	June 30, 2025
Alfel Bascug	Agusan del Sur's 1st congressional district	June 30, 2019
Eddiebong Plaza	Agusan del Sur's 2nd congressional district	June 30, 2019
Caloy Loria	Albay's 2nd congressional district	June 30, 2025
Ronaldo Puno	Antipolo's 1st congressional district	June 30, 2025
Bong Acop	Antipolo's 2nd congressional district	March 16, 2026
Albert Garcia	Bataan's 2nd congressional district	June 30, 2022
Maria Angela Garcia	Bataan's 3rd congressional district	June 30, 2022
John Geesnell Yap	Bohol's 1st congressional district	June 30, 2025
Vanvan Aumentado	Bohol's 2nd congressional district	June 30, 2022
Alexie Tutor	Bohol's 3rd congressional district	June 30, 2019
Jose Manuel Alba	Bukidnon's 1st congressional district	June 30, 2022
Danny Domingo	Bulacan's 1st congressional district	June 30, 2022
Augustina Dominique Pancho	Bulacan's 2nd congressional district	June 30, 2022
Dean Asistio	Caloocan's 3rd congressional district	June 30, 2022
Hori Horibata	Camarines Sur's 1st congressional district	June 30, 2022
Luigi Villafuerte	Camarines Sur's 2nd congressional district	June 30, 2025
Miguel Luis Villafuerte	Camarines Sur's 5th congressional district	June 30, 2022
Jolo Revilla	Cavite's 1st congressional district	June 30, 2022
Adrian Jay Advincula	Cavite's 3rd congressional district	June 30, 2022
Jenny Barzaga	Cavite's 4th congressional district	September 1, 2026
Antonio Ferrer	Cavite's 6th congressional district	June 30, 2022
Crispin Diego Remulla	Cavite's 7th congressional district	February 28, 2023
Aniela Tolentino	Cavite's 8th congressional district	June 30, 2022
Rhea Gullas	Cebu's 1st congressional district	June 30, 2022
Karen Flores-Garcia	Cebu's 3rd congressional district	June 30, 2025
Sun Shimura	Cebu's 4th congressional district	June 30, 2025
Daphne Lagon	Cebu's 6th congressional district	June 30, 2022
Rachel del Mar	Cebu City's 1st congressional district	June 30, 2022
Sheen Gonzales	Eastern Samar's at-large congressional district	June 30, 2025
JC Rahman Nava	Guimaras's at-large congressional district	June 30, 2025
Lorenz Defensor	Iloilo's 3rd congressional district	June 30, 2019
Anna Victoria Tuazon	Leyte's 3rd congressional district	June 30, 2022
Antolin Oreta III	Malabon's at-large congressional district	June 30, 2025
Alexandria Gonzales	Mandaluyong's at-large congressional district	June 30, 2025
Ernix Dionisio	Manila's 1st congressional district	June 30, 2022
Rolan Valeriano	Manila's 2nd congressional district	June 30, 2022
Joel Chua	Manila's 3rd congressional district	June 30, 2022
Irwin Tieng	Manila's 5th congressional district	June 30, 2022
Benny Abante	Manila's 6th congressional district	July 8, 2025
Marcelino Teodoro	Marikina's 1st congressional district	July 1, 2025
Karen Lagbas	Misamis Oriental's 1st congressional district	June 30, 2025
Alfredo Marañon III	Negros Occidental's 2nd congressional district	June 30, 2022
Jeffrey Ferrer	Negros Occidental's 4th congressional district	June 30, 2025
Niko Raul Daza	Northern Samar's 1st congressional district	June 30, 2025
Rosalie Salvame	Palawan's 1st congressional district	June 30, 2025
Anna York Bondoc	Pampanga's 4th congressional district	June 30, 2022
Brian Yamsuan	Parañaque's 2nd congressional district	June 30, 2025
Arjo Atayde	Quezon City's 1st congressional district	June 30, 2022
Franz Pumaren	Quezon City's 3rd congressional district	June 30, 2022
Marivic Co-Pilar	Quezon City's 6th congressional district	June 30, 2022
Steve Solon	Sarangani's at-large congressional district	June 30, 2022
Christopherson Yap	Southern Leyte's 2nd congressional district	June 30, 2022
Dimszar Sali	Tawi-Tawi's at-large congressional district	June 30, 2022
Jerry Perez	Zamboanga City's 2nd congressional district	June 30, 2025

==== Governors ====
Provincial Governors of NUP in 2025
Name	Province	Took office
Santiago Cane Jr.	Agusan del Sur	June 30, 2019
Noel Rosal	Albay	June 30, 2025
Daniel Fernando	Bulacan	June 30, 2019
Luis Raymund Villafuerte	Camarines Sur	June 30, 2025
Patrick Azanza	Catanduanes	June 30, 2025
Abeng Remulla	Cavite	June 30, 2025
Lucille Nava	Guimaras	June 30, 2025
Juliette Uy	Misamis Oriental	June 30, 2025
Harris Ongchuan	Northern Samar	June 30, 2025
Johnny Pimentel	Surigao del Sur	June 30, 2025

==== Notable Mayors ====
Notable Mayors of NUP in 2025
Name	Municipality/City	Took office
Luis Ferrer IV	General Trias	June 30, 2022
Rico Roque	Pandi, Bulacan	June 30, 2019
Raisa Treñas	Iloilo City	June 30, 2025

== Election results ==
=== Presidential and vice presidential elections ===
Year	Presidential election			Vice presidential election		
Year	Candidate	Vote share	Result	Candidate	Vote share	Result
2016	None		Rodrigo Duterte (PDP–Laban)	None		Leni Robredo (Liberal)
2022	None (Note: NUP endorsed Bongbong Marcos for president.)		Bongbong Marcos (PFP)	None (Note: NUP endorsed Sara Duterte for vice president.)		Sara Duterte (Lakas)

=== Legislative elections ===
Congress of the Philippines
House of Representatives			Senate			
Year	Seats won	Result	Year	Seats won	Ticket	Result
2013	24 / 292	Liberal plurality	2013	Did not participate		Team PNoy win 9/12 seats
2016	23 / 297	Liberal plurality	2016	Did not participate		Daang Matuwid win 7/12 seats
2019	25 / 304	PDP–Laban plurality	2019	Did not participate		Hugpong win 9/12 seats
2022	33 / 316	PDP–Laban plurality	2022	Did not participate		UniTeam win 6/12 seats
2025	31 / 317	Lakas plurality	2025	Did not participate		Bagong Pilipinas win 6/12 seats
