= Paco Park =

Park and historic cemetery in Manila

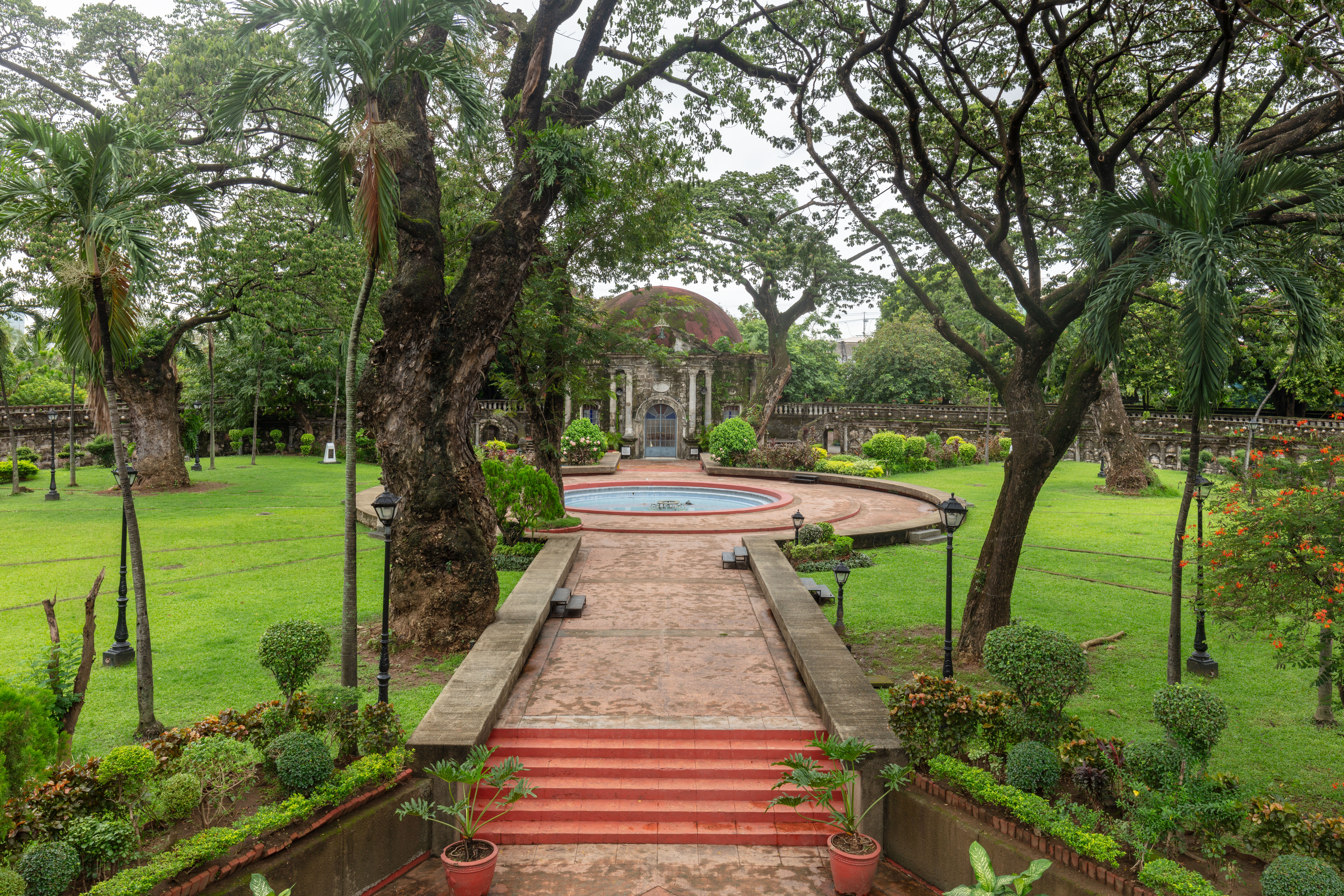
- Paco Park
- Interactive map of Paco Park
- Type: Urban park
- Location: Paco, Manila, Philippines
- Coordinates: 14°34′52″N 120°59′20″E
- Area: 0.411 hectares (1.02 acres)
- Created: 1966
- Operator: National Parks Development Committee
- Public transit: United Nations; 6 17 United Nations

The Paco Park (originally named as Cementerio General de Dilao) is a recreational garden and was once Manila's municipal cemetery built by the Dominicans during the Spanish colonial period. It is located on General Luna Street and at the east end of Padre Faura Street in Paco, Manila, Philippines.

Paco Park has also become a popular venue for TV and film shootings, weddings, pre-nuptial shoots, private gatherings and cultural programs. One of its exposures in a movie was in Starting Over Again (2014).

== History ==
=== Spanish period ===
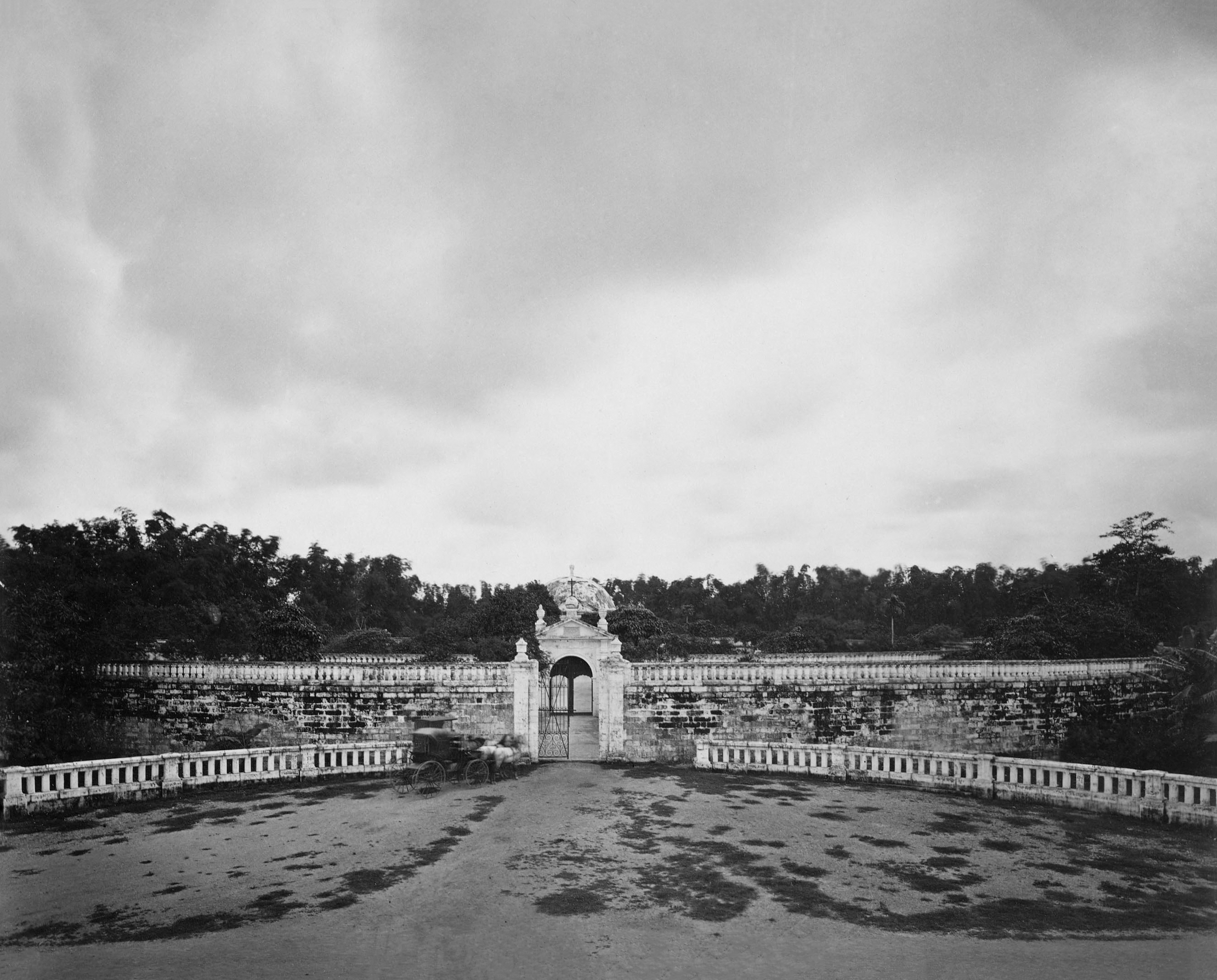
Cementerio General de Dilao, 1870s

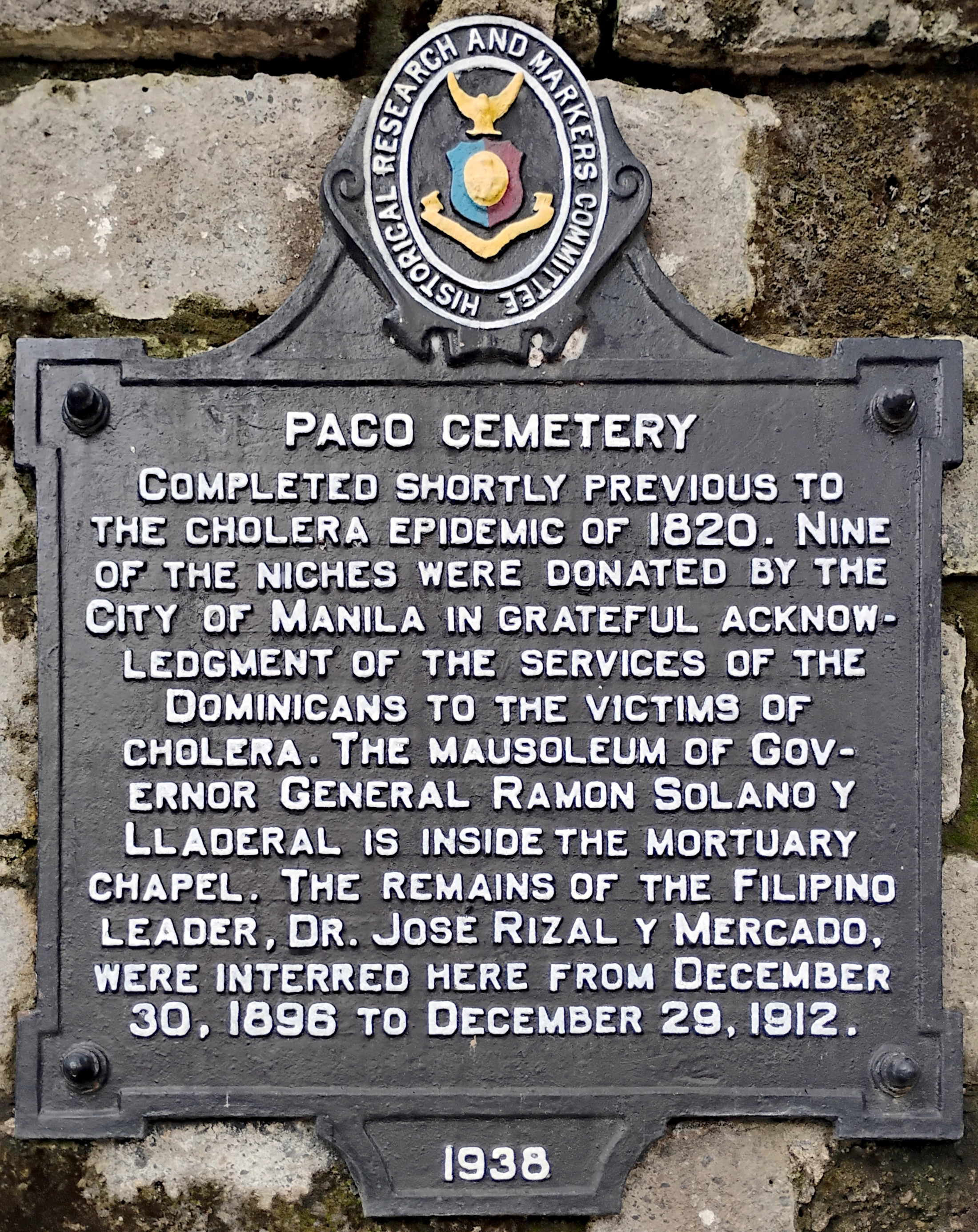
Cemetery HRMC historical marker

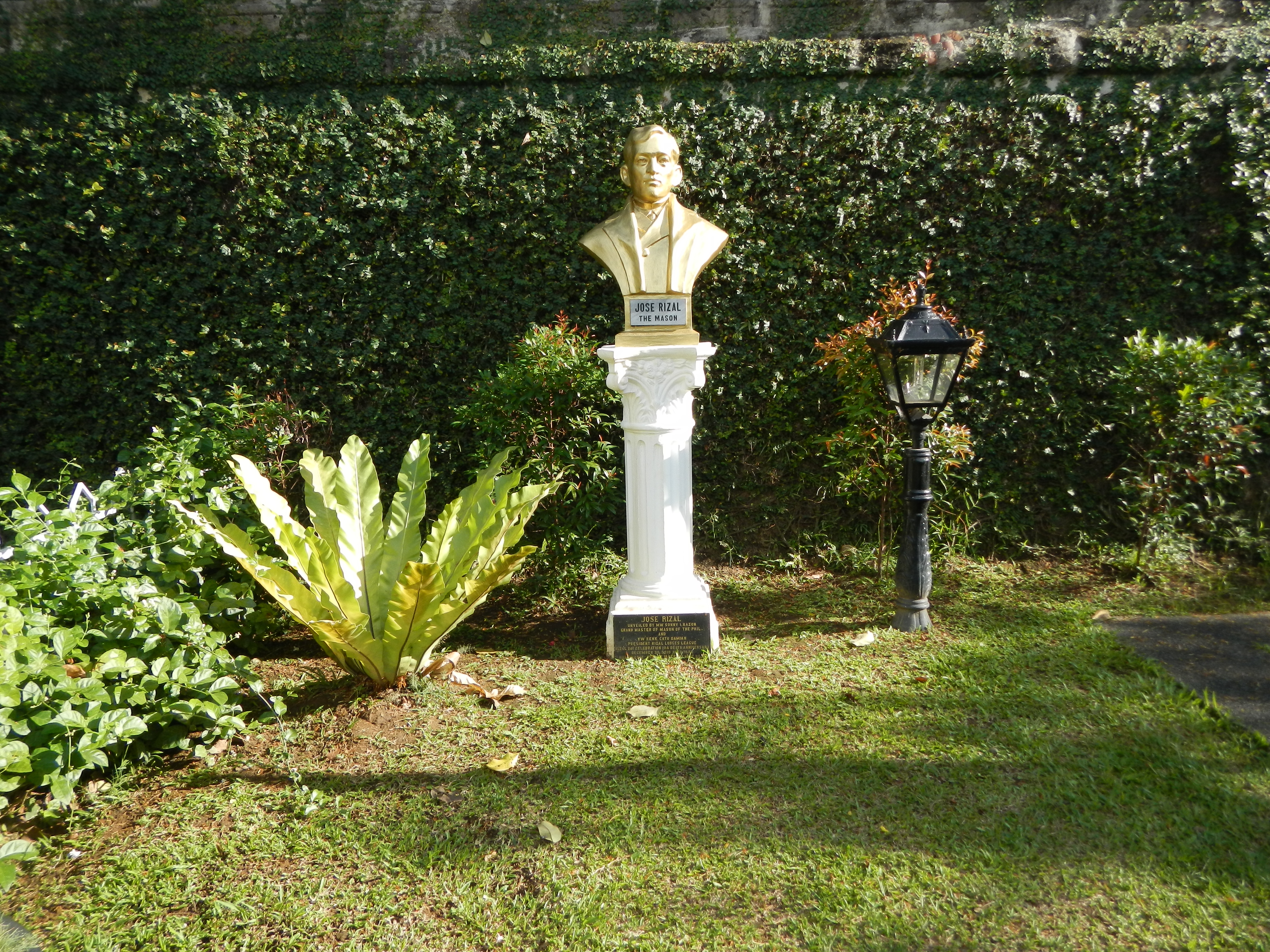
Bust of José Rizal inside Paco Cemetery

According to an on-site inscription, an order for the construction of a cemetery in Bagumbayan was issued in 1807, due to the outbreak of a cholera epidemic in Manila. Maestro de Obras Don Nicolas Ruiz developed a plan for the Paco Cemetery, while Don Jose Coll served as supervisor of the construction work. The cemetery was primarily designed as a municipal cemetery for the affluent and established aristocratic Spanish families who resided in the old Manila, or the city within the walls of Intramuros during the Spanish colonial era. It was on April 22, 1822, when the cemetery was officially inaugurated, although it had been in use for two years prior to its completion.

In 1859, Governor Fernándo Norzagaray y Escudero proposed the extension of the cemetery to approximately 4,500 square yards, enclosing the original plan with another circular outer wall. For the amount of Php 19,700, a Chinese builder won the bid to build the outer portion of the cemetery. At that time, the niches cost Php 20 for three years, which was subject to renewals as no one was granted privilege to own the niches in perpetuity.

On December 30, 1896, Philippine national hero Dr. José Rizal was interred at Paco Park after his execution at Bagumbayan.

Interment at the Paco Cemetery ceased in 1912. It had been the burial ground for several generations and descendants of those buried in the park had the remains of their ancestors exhumed and transferred to other cemeteries in Manila. However, 65 people still remain buried at Paco.

=== American and Japanese period ===
During the Second World War, Japanese forces used Paco Park as a central supply and ammunition depot. The high thick adobe walls around the park were ideal for defensive positions of the Japanese. Prior to the liberation of Manila in 1945, the Japanese dug several trenches and pill boxes around and within the Park with three 75 millimeter guns to defend their fortification against the charging 1st Battalion of the 148th Infantry Regiment of the United States Army and Philippine Commonwealth Army.

=== Post-war and modern period ===
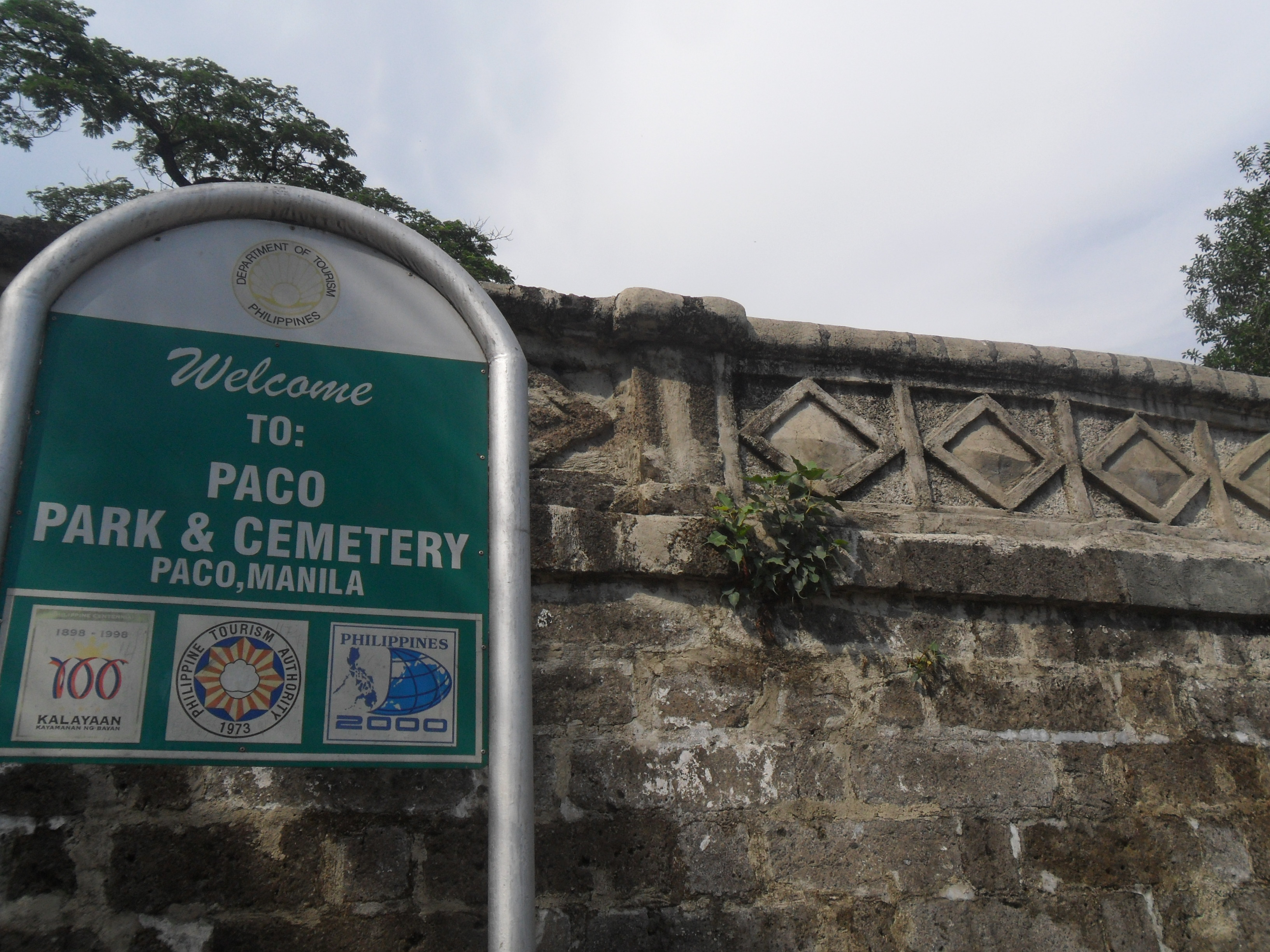
Paco Park entrance marker

The park was converted into a National Park in 1966 during the term of President Diosdado Macapagal. Paco Park's grandeur was slowly restored after the war and since then has remained as a public park and promenade for the community.

Paco Park and its care was placed under the responsibility of the National Park's Development Committee (NPDC) during the regime of President Ferdinand E. Marcos. During the Marcos period, through the efforts of First Lady Imelda R. Marcos, culture was given emphasis and priority in the country and Paco Park was one of the few venues chosen to host events related to culture. On February 29, 1980, then Press and Cultural Attache of the Embassy of the Federal Republic of Germany in the Philippines, Dr. Christoph Jessen with then NPDC Vice-Chairperson Teodoro Valencia started a classical concert at the park as part of the celebrations for the “Philippine-German Month.” The program became a tradition, a weekly fare held every Friday afternoons called the “Paco Park Presents.”

The event featured and highlighted the exchange of Filipino and German musical artists who performed at Paco Park and it served as a means to strengthen the bond between Germany and the Philippines. In 1998, the celebration of Philippine-German month was moved from February to March, with the concert starting at 7:00 pm. However, Paco Park Presents continues to celebrate its anniversary every February. In addition, "Paco Park Presents" features the finest musical artists and chorales, local and guests performers for an evening of classical and traditional Filipino music every Friday by sunset but it was used to aired on the People's Television Network (PTV).

Due to the COVID-19 pandemic, Paco Park was temporarily closed to the public.

== Architecture and design ==
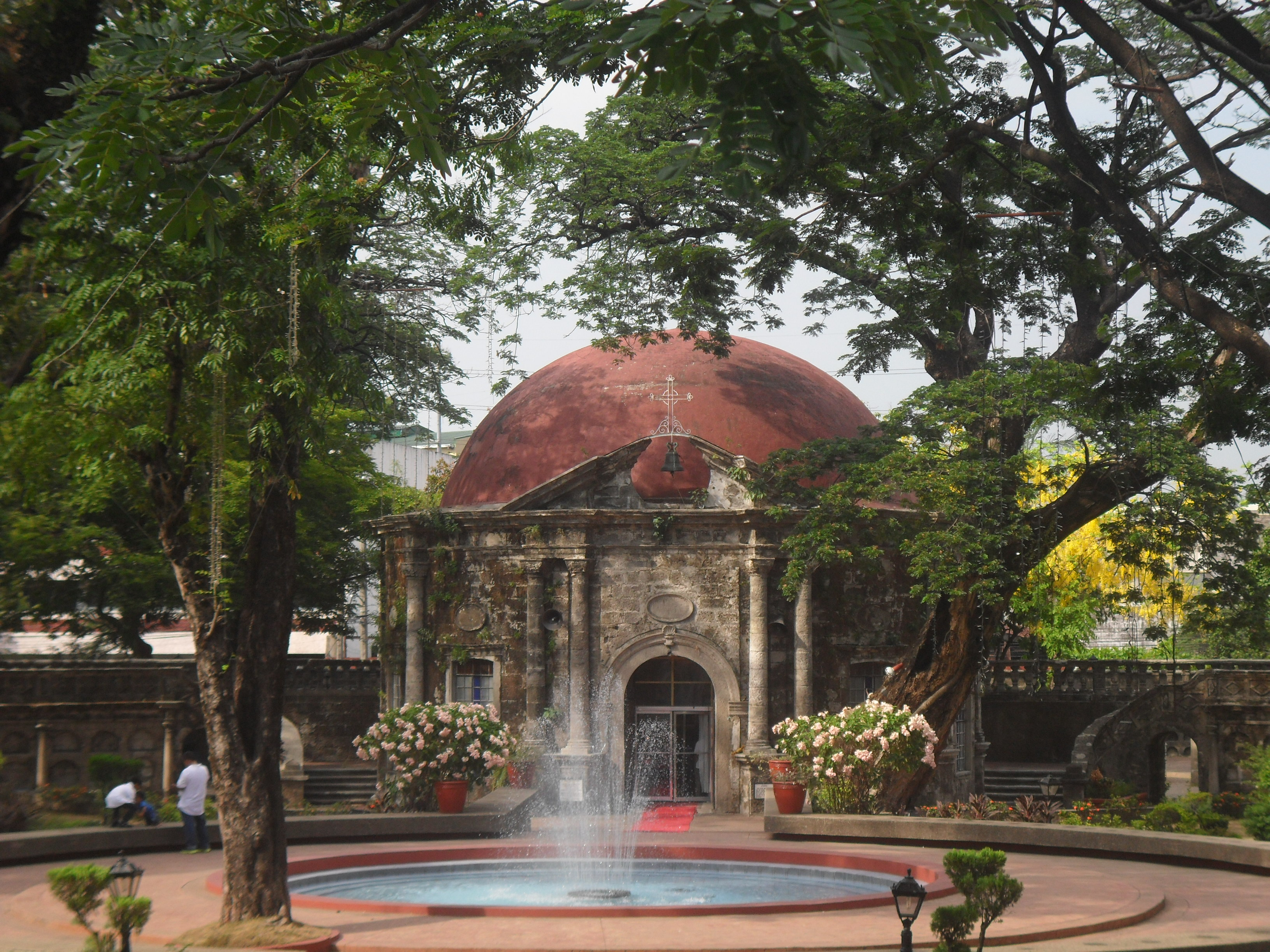
St. Pancratius Chapel at the rear of the park

Paco Park is circular in shape, with an inner circular fort that stood as the original cemetery. Its walls were made hollow to serve as niches, and as the population continued to grow, a second outer wall was built with thick adobe walls. The top of the walls were then made into pathways for promenades. A small, domed Roman Catholic chapel was also built inside the walls of the park and was dedicated to St. Pancratius.

Ildefonso P. Santos, Jr., a noted landscape architect who was given recognition as a Philippine National Artist, was involved in the designing of Paco Park.

=== St. Pancratius Chapel ===
Inside the Paco Cemetery is a chapel dedicated to St. Pancratius, a Roman citizen who converted to Christianity, and was beheaded for his faith at the age of just 14 around the year 304. His name is Greek and literally means "the one that holds everything."

The chapel is under the care of the San Vicente de Paul Parish and the Vincentian fathers who also manage the nearby Adamson University.

== Notable interments ==
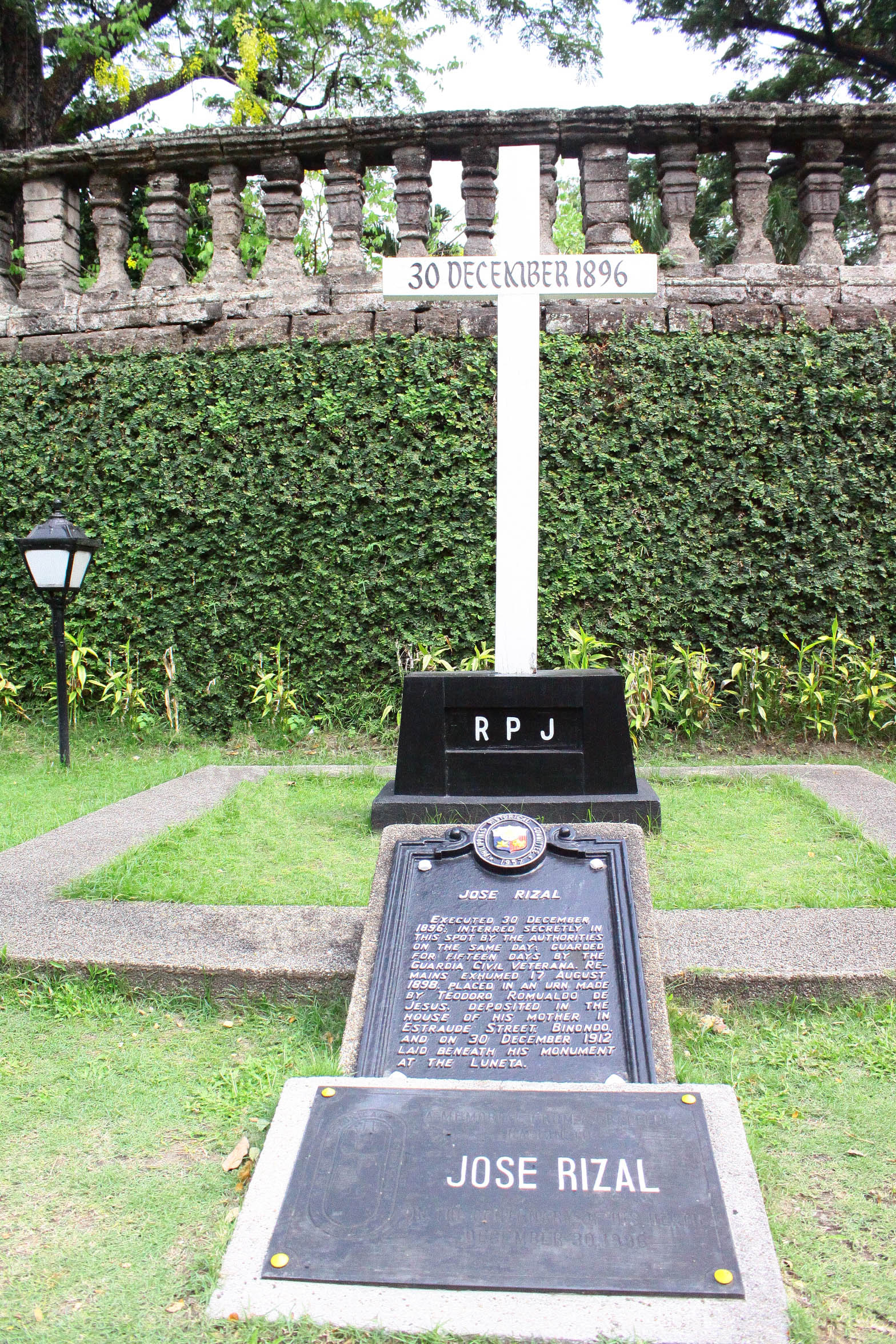
Temporary burial site of José Rizal at Paco Park in Manila. Slightly renovated and date repainted in English.

- Dr. José Protasio Rizal, Philippine National Hero, was secretly interred at Paco Park after his execution at Bagumbayan on December 30, 1896, and was guarded for fifteen days by the Guardia Civil Veterana. His remains were exhumed on August 17, 1898, and on December 30, 1912, was laid underneath the monument dedicated to him at Luneta as stated in the Park's marker.
- Ramon Maria Llanderal Solano, Spanish Governor-General of the Philippines (1857–1860).
- GomBurZa friars (Fr. Mariano Gomez, Fr. Jose Burgos, and 'Fr. Jacinto Zamora), a trio of diocesan clergymen (secular priest), were buried in the cemetery grounds after their execution on February 17, 1872, after being falsely accused of being linked to the Cavite Mutiny.
- Delfina Herbosa de Natividad, one of the three women, together with Marcela Agoncillo and her daughter Lorenza, who seamed together the Philippine flag. Her remains were interred in the wall niches (written as Nicho Paco in the death certificate). The location of her grave has not been identified.

== See also ==
- List of parks in Manila
- Demographic history of the Philippines
- Timeline of Philippine history
- Culture of the Philippines
