= El Presidente (film) =

El Presidente: The Story of Emilio Aguinaldo and the First Philippine Republic
- Theatrical film poster
- Directed by: Mark Meily
- Written by: Mark Meily
- Based on: "Memoirs of a Revolution" by Emilio Aguinaldo
- Produced by: Maylyn Villalon-Enriquez; Leonard Villalon
- Starring: Jeorge "E.R." Ejercito Estregan; Nora Aunor; Christopher de Leon; Cristine Reyes; Cesar Montano
- Cinematography: Carlo Mendoza
- Edited by: Jason Cahapay; Ryan Orduña
- Music by: Jessie Lasaten
- Production companies: Scenema Concept International; CMB Films; San Miguel Corporation
- Distributed by: VIVA Films
- Release date: December 25, 2012
- Running time: 165 minutes
- Country: Philippines
- Languages: Filipino; Spanish; English
- Budget: ₱130 million
- Box office: ₱22.6 million

El Presidente: The Story of Emilio Aguinaldo and the First Philippine Republic, (Spanish: El Presidente: Historia del General Emilio Aguinaldo y la Primera República de Filipinas; Tagalog: Ang Pangulo: Kuwento ni Heneral Emilio Aguinaldo at ang Unang Republika ng Pilipinas) or simply El Presidente (English: The President), is a 2012 Filipino biographical historical drama film written and directed by Mark Meily about the life of General Emilio Aguinaldo, the first president of the Philippine Republic. The film stars Jeorge "E.R." Ejercito Estregan in the title role, along with Nora Aunor, Christopher de Leon, Cristine Reyes, and Cesar Montano.

The film was one of the official entries to the 2012 Metro Manila Film Festival and was released in theaters nationwide on December 25, 2012. Produced by Scenema Concept International, CMB Films and Viva Films, in cooperation with San Miguel Corporation, Petron Corporation, Boy Scouts of the Philippines, Las Casas Filipinas de Acúzar, and the Film Development Council of the Philippines, it premiered on December 18, 2012, at the SM Mall of Asia's SMX Convention Center Manila.

== Plot ==
In 1886, a young Emilio Aguinaldo and his best friend Candido Tirona receive cryptic prophecies from an old woman; Aguinaldo learns of his rise to power and eventual downfall while Tirona learns of his death. Ten years later, Aguinaldo, now the gobernadorcillo of his hometown Cavite El Viejo, is secretly inducted into the Katipunan by its leader Andrés Bonifacio, and assumes leadership of its Cavite chapter. When trouble breaks out in Manila in late August, the Philippine Revolution starts and Aguinaldo secretly mobilizes his army despite the lack of weapons. Learning that the Spaniards have deployed most of their forces in and around Manila, Aguinaldo leads his army and defeats the Spanish troops in a series of battles that liberate Cavite from Spanish hands, but at great cost as Tirona is killed in action, as the old woman predicted.

As the Katipunan gains ground in Cavite and the nearby provinces, its Magdalo and Magdiwang factions convene at Tejeros to create a revolutionary government that will unify the divided revolutionaries. The ensuing election ends with Aguinaldo elected as president, Mariano Trías as vice-president, and Bonifacio himself as interior minister. Bonifacio later storms out of the convention after Daniel Tirona objects to his position. Meanwhile, as Aguinaldo and his forces fight the Spaniards at Pasong Santol, he receives news of his victory at the convention from his brother. Aguinaldo leaves his men under his brother's command while he attends his inauguration. Aguinaldo eventually hears of his brother's death and his army's defeats. Aguinaldo also learns that an embittered Bonifacio has established his own government in Naic since no one in the Katipunan recognizes him as leader anymore. Bonifacio is soon arrested by Aguinaldo's supporters who accuse him of sedition during his trial. Unwilling to fracture the Katipunan any further as it will jeopardize their unity against the Spaniards, Aguinaldo orders Bonifacio simply be exiled but the war council secretly orders Bonifacio's execution.

Several months later, the war's tide is turned when Cavite is retaken by the Spaniards. Aguinaldo, with most of his forces, retreats to Biak-na-Bato in Bulacan where he creates a new revolutionary government and negotiates with the Spaniards to end the conflict and peacefully secure the country's independence; in exchange, however, Aguinaldo and his followers have to go to Hong Kong. In there, Aguinaldo meets with U.S. officials who offer him support. As the Spanish–American War takes place, Aguinaldo returns to the Philippines and defeats the Spaniards, finally winning the country's freedom. The First Philippine Republic is then formed in Malolos while the diplomat Felipe Agoncillo tries in vain to represent the newly formed nation at the peace negotiations between Spain and the U.S. in Paris.

The peace treaty eventually ends with Spain secretly selling the Philippines to the U.S. for $20,000,000 in order to evade humiliation. This results in a brutal war with the Americans in February of the following year. Antonio Luna, a short-tempered general, is appointed commander of the army. However, because of his brash and ruthless nature, Luna is brutally murdered by disgruntled troops and the Filipino forces are easily routed by the Americans. As a result, Aguinaldo flees to Northern Luzon. American forces quickly catch up and a young general Gregorio del Pilar holds them off at Tirad Pass, allowing Aguinaldo to continue his escape. Two years later, in Palanan, Isabela, Aguinaldo's loyal courier is captured by the Americans while getting some medicine for his sick son. After learning from him of Aguinaldo's whereabouts, American forces under Frederick Funston and their Kapampangan scouts capture Aguinaldo. The war ends in American victory and, as the old woman predicted, Aguinaldo laments his downfall.

After he formally acknowledges the American occupation of the Philippines, Aguinaldo lives a quiet life in the passing decades during which his wife Hilaria dies of illness. He later marries Agoncillo's niece Maria, tries to run as President again but is defeated in the presidential elections, collaborates with the Japanese, and witnesses the restoration of full independence, where he is overjoyed when its date was moved to June 12th.

As an elderly Aguinaldo suffers a series of strokes that affect his health, the old woman who gave him his prophecy appears to him at his deathbed one more time and reveals herself as Inang Bayan, the personification of the Philippines, before she transitions to her younger self. The film ends when we see Aguinaldo and Inang Bayan at the river, as Aguinaldo waves the Philippine flag for the final time.

== Cast ==
- Jeorge "E.R." Ejercito Estregan as Gen. Emilio Aguinaldo
  - Jericho Ejercito as young Emilio Aguinaldo
- Nora Aunor as María Agoncillo
- Christopher de Leon as Gen. Antonio Luna
- Cesar Montano as Andrés Bonifacio
- Cristine Reyes as Hilaria Aguinaldo
- Alicia Meyer as the old lady/Inang Bayan (Mother Land)
- Ronnie Lazaro as Gen. Candido Tirona
  - Mav Lozano as young Candido Tirona
- Bayani Agbayani as Gen. Baldomero Aguinaldo
- Gerard Ejercito as Gen. Críspulo Aguinaldo
- Allan Paule as Gen. Tomás Mascardo
- Emilio Garcia as Gen. Pío del Pilar
- Wendell Ramos as Gen. Mariano Noriel
- John Arcilla as Gen. Mariano Trías
- Mike Lloren as Vicente Riego de Dios
- Ian de Leon as Capt. Artemio Ricarte
- Felix Roco as Gen. Gregorio del Pilar
- Dindo Arroyo as Gen. Macario Sakay
- Ricardo Cepeda as Col. Lucio de Vega
- Lorenzo Mara as Dr. Dominador Gómez
- Carlos Morales as Gen. León Villafuerte
- Alireza Libre as Gen. Edilberto Evangelista
- Richard Manabat as Ambrosio Rianzares Bautista
- Gary Estrada as Comdr. José Tagle
- Allen Dizon as Comdr. Simeón Villa
- Will Devaughn as Comdr. Agapito Bonzón
- Crispin Pineda as José P. Elises
- Hero Bautista as Major Lázaro Macapagal
- Andro Morgan as Major Eugenio
- Yul Servo as Pedro Paterno
- William Martinez as Dr. Santiago Barcelona
- Ronnie Quizon as Apolinario Mabini
- Epy Quizon as José Clemente Zulueta
- Alvin Anson as Felipe Agoncillo
- Lou Veloso as Julián Felipe
- Sid Lucero as Gaudioso Samaniego
- Sunshine Cruz as Gregoria de Jesús
- Joko Diaz as Procopio Bonifacio
- Rommel Montano as Ciriaco Bonifacio
- Archie Adamos as Luis Aguado
- Soliman Cruz as Máximo Inocencio
- Roi Vinzon as Lázaro Segovia
- Dennis Padilla as Tal Placido
- John Regala as Padre Agustín
- Baron Geisler as Lt. Chacón
- Ian Veneracion as Gen. Ernesto Aguirre
- Tony Mabesa as Gen. Echaluche
- Troy Montero as Col. Frederick Funston
- James Paolleli as Gen. Arthur MacArthur
- Recto Cantimbulan as Padre Cenón Villafranca
- Joonee Gamboa as Amb. Felipe Buencamino
- Mark Meily as Presidente ng Indang
- Roldan Aquino as María Agoncillo's father
- Gloria Sevilla as María Agoncillo's mother
- Lariel Castro as Cecilio
- Darry dela Cruz as Igorot
- Elaine Lozano as Sor Gallego
- Maita Ejercito as Marcela Agoncillo
- Jhulia Ejercito as Lorenza Agoncillo
  - Leah Villalon as older Lorenza Agoncillo
- Jenny Javier as Delfina Herbosa de Natividad
- Maylyn Enriquez as Felicidad Aguado
- Melissa Yotoko as Consuelo Almiránez
- Jess Evardone as Severino de las Alas
- Bearwin Meily as Benjamín San Luis
- Emmanuelle Ejercito as Gregorio Jocson
- Chris Perris as Capt. Harry Hill Bandholtz
- Brenton Metken as Rousenville Wildman
- Henry Strzalkowski as Gen. Francis Greene
- Oliver Borlen as Théophile Delcassé
- Allan Pérez as Governor-General Ramón Blanco
- Ces Aldabe as Mariano Álvarez
- Don Umali as Daniel Tirona
- Arkin da Silva as Ariston Villanueva
- Mario Capalad as Santiago Álvarez
- Arian Labios as Pedro Girón
- Jojo Gallego as José del Rosario
- Eddie del Mar as Jacinto Lumbre
- Romeo Edgar Ambrogar as Emiliano Riego de Dios
- Sonny Alcantara as Pío Valenzuela
- Jomar Daynt as Col. Pedro Lipana
- Jun Nayra as Mariano Riego de Dios
- Rogelio Aldo Yadao as Col. Paco Román
- Perry Dizon as Capt. Pedro Janolino
- Eric Perez as Padre Fidel de Bias
- Johnny Barnes as Felipe Calderón
- Roger Clarico as Legarda
- Ace Mangamon as Flavio

== Development ==
A 350-page script emerged in 1998, with the proposed film meant for the Philippines' Independence Centennial, but no production was made.

Ejercito said Meily was chosen to direct the film due to his knowledge of Aguinaldo, experience in large productions, and personal belief in him. Meily's appointment was made despite swearing never to helm a historical film again, after working on Baler in 2008. Ejercito's second choice for director was Mario O'Hara; the latter died before Ejercito made him an offer, on June 26, 2012. Ejercito ruled out picking Tikoy Aguiluz because a falling-out between them during the editing of his last film, Manila Kingpin.

Despite the existence of the 1998 script, Meily opted to create an entirely different script instead. He wanted to hire screenwriters at Ejercito's request, but volunteered to write it himself when no writers joined the project. Meily claims he tried to make the film as factually accurate as possible, and he describes the finished product as "95 percent" accurate to what really happened. Historians were on set to ensure full accuracy.

Ejercito described the film as much harder to make than Manila Kingpin because it "deals directly with our country's history." Over 50 professional actors and actresses were cast for the movie. He also described the "set, costumes, locations, and logistics" as "staggering by all Philippine cinema standards." He also claimed that it was the biggest and most expensive Filipino film ever, as the film was made on a budget of ₱130 million. Shooting took place over 43 days at select locations in Cavite, Laguna, and Bulacan.

== Release ==
El Presidente, along with seven other Metro Manila Film Festival entries, was released on December 25, 2012, in 54 theaters, although it was premiered on December 18, 2012, at the SMX Convention Center at the SM Mall of Asia. It went on to gross PhP4.2 million in Metro Manila, the sixth most among MMFF films. After the film festival ended, the Metropolitan Manila Development Authority did not release the total box office gross of the film as it was not in the top four highest-grossing films. Ejercito complained that the film's low box office gross was due to rigged theater distribution, as more popular films were released in as many as 130 theaters. While all eight film festival entries were released in the same number of theaters in Metro Manila via drawing lots, theaters in the province could decide whichever movies to show.

== Critical reception ==
The movie garnered mostly positive reviews from critics. The Philippines' Cinema Evaluation Board graded the film an A, and it has been endorsed by the government's Department of Education, the Commission on Higher Education, and the Film Development Council of the Philippines.

In a review, Phillip Cu-Unjieng of the Philippine Star said it "vividly recaptures" one of the Philippines' most turbulent periods in history by exposing the infighting among the Katipunan's members and how Aguinaldo wanted to resolve them. He noted that the film's quality makes it almost stand out as much as Richard Attenborough's Gandhi, Steven Spielberg's Lincoln, and Martin Scorsese's The Aviator. Philibert Ortiz-Dy of ClickTheCity.com, on the other hand, gave the film two and a half stars out of five, describing El Presidente as "deeply flawed as an entertainment, but there's a lot in it to like." While he did note the film was ambitious, he also stated that the "lack of focus hurts it in the end", due to its large scope.

Rommel R. Llanes of the Philippine Entertainment Portal especially praised the performances of Montano and de Leon as Bonifacio and Luna, respectively. However, he also stated that Ejercito occasionally felt like Asiong Salonga, the main character of his previous film, Manila Kingpin. Maridol Rañoa-Bismark, writing for Yahoo! Philippines, highly praised the film for "its breathtaking cinematography, well-choreographed fight scenes, haunting music and brilliant acting", but mostly for it being about the "triumph of good over evil."

Columnist and radio show host Jessica Zafra, however, was critical of the movie's treatment. She said the depiction of Bonifacio's death raised questions about its authenticity. She added that the film itself "does Emilio Aguinaldo a disservice by portraying him as a victim of circumstance" and even highlighted the "amnesia" prevalent among contemporary Filipinos.

The movie garnered the most awards at the 2012 Metro Manila Film Festival, winning the plums for Second Best Picture, Best Supporting Actor (Cesar Montano), Youth Choice Award, Best Float, Best Sound, Best Musical Score, and Best Make-up.

=== Awards and recognition ===
Year	Award-giving body	Category	Recipient	Result
2012	Metro Manila Film Festival	Second Best Picture	El Presidente	Won
2012	Metro Manila Film Festival	Best Actor	E.R. Ejercito	Nominated
2012	Metro Manila Film Festival	Best Supporting Actor	Cesar Montano	Won
2012	Metro Manila Film Festival	Best Supporting Actor	Baron Geisler	Nominated
2012	Metro Manila Film Festival	Best Supporting Actor	Christopher de Leon	Nominated
2012	Metro Manila Film Festival	Best Musical Score	Jessie Lasaten	Won
2012	Metro Manila Film Festival	Best Sound Recording	Albert Michael Idioma	Won
2012	Metro Manila Film Festival	Best Original Theme Song	Apl.de.ap and Jamir Garcia	Won
2012	Metro Manila Film Festival	Best Make-up	Warren Munar, Benny Batoctoy and Virginia Apolinario	Won
2012	Metro Manila Film Festival	Best Float	El Presidente	Won
2013	Filipino Academy of Movie Arts and Sciences Awards	Best Picture	El Presidente	Won
2013	Filipino Academy of Movie Arts and Sciences Awards	Best Director	Mark Meily	Won
2013	Filipino Academy of Movie Arts and Sciences Awards	Best Actor	E.R. Ejercito	Won
2013	Filipino Academy of Movie Arts and Sciences Awards	Best Actress	Cristine Reyes	Nominated
2013	Filipino Academy of Movie Arts and Sciences Awards	Best Supporting Actor	Cesar Montano	Won
2013	Filipino Academy of Movie Arts and Sciences Awards	Best Screenplay	Mark Meily	Won
2013	Filipino Academy of Movie Arts and Sciences Awards	Best Cinematography	Carlo Mendoza	Won
2013	Filipino Academy of Movie Arts and Sciences Awards	Best Production Design	Danny Red and Joel Bilbao	Won
2013	Filipino Academy of Movie Arts and Sciences Awards	Best Editing	Jason Cahapay and Ryan Orduña	Won
2013	Filipino Academy of Movie Arts and Sciences Awards	Best Sound	Albert Michael Idioma and Addiss Tabong	Won
2013	Filipino Academy of Movie Arts and Sciences Awards	Best Original Theme Song	Marizen Yaneza, Jessie Lasaten, and Maita Ejercito	Won
2013	Filipino Academy of Movie Arts and Sciences Awards	Best Story	El Presidente	Won
2013	Film Academy of the Philippines	Best Picture	El Presidente	Won
2013	Film Academy of the Philippines	Best Director	Mark Meily	Nominated
2013	Film Academy of the Philippines	Best Cinematography	Carlo Mendoza	Won
2013	Film Academy of the Philippines	Best Production Design	Danny Red and Joel Bilbao	Won
2013	Film Academy of the Philippines	Best Editing	Jason Cahapay and Ryan Orduña	Nominated
2013	Film Academy of the Philippines	Best Music	Jessie Lasaten	Won
2013	Film Academy of the Philippines	Best Sound	Albert Michael Idioma	Won
2013	Golden Screen Awards	Best Performance by an Actor in a Supporting Role	Cesar Montano	Nominated
2013	Golden Screen Awards	Best Production Design	Danny Red and Joel Bilbao	Nominated
2013	Golden Screen Awards	Best Musical Score	Jessie Lasaten	Nominated
2013	Golden Screen Awards	Best Original Song	"Aking Inang Bayan" by Marizen Yaneza, Jessie Lasaten and Maita Ejercito	Nominated
