= Delfina Herbosa de Natividad =

Filipino renowned

Maria Delfina Herbosa de Natividad
- Born: December 20, 1879; Calamba, Laguna, Captaincy General of the Philippines
- Died: March 11, 1900 (aged 20); Paseo de Azcarraga, Manila, Philippine Islands
- Resting place: Paco Park
- Spouse: Gen. Jose Salvador Natividad (m. 1898)
- Children: 1
- Relatives: José Rizal (uncle); Gen. Mamerto Natividad Jr. (brother-in-law); Gen. Benito Natividad (brother-in-law)

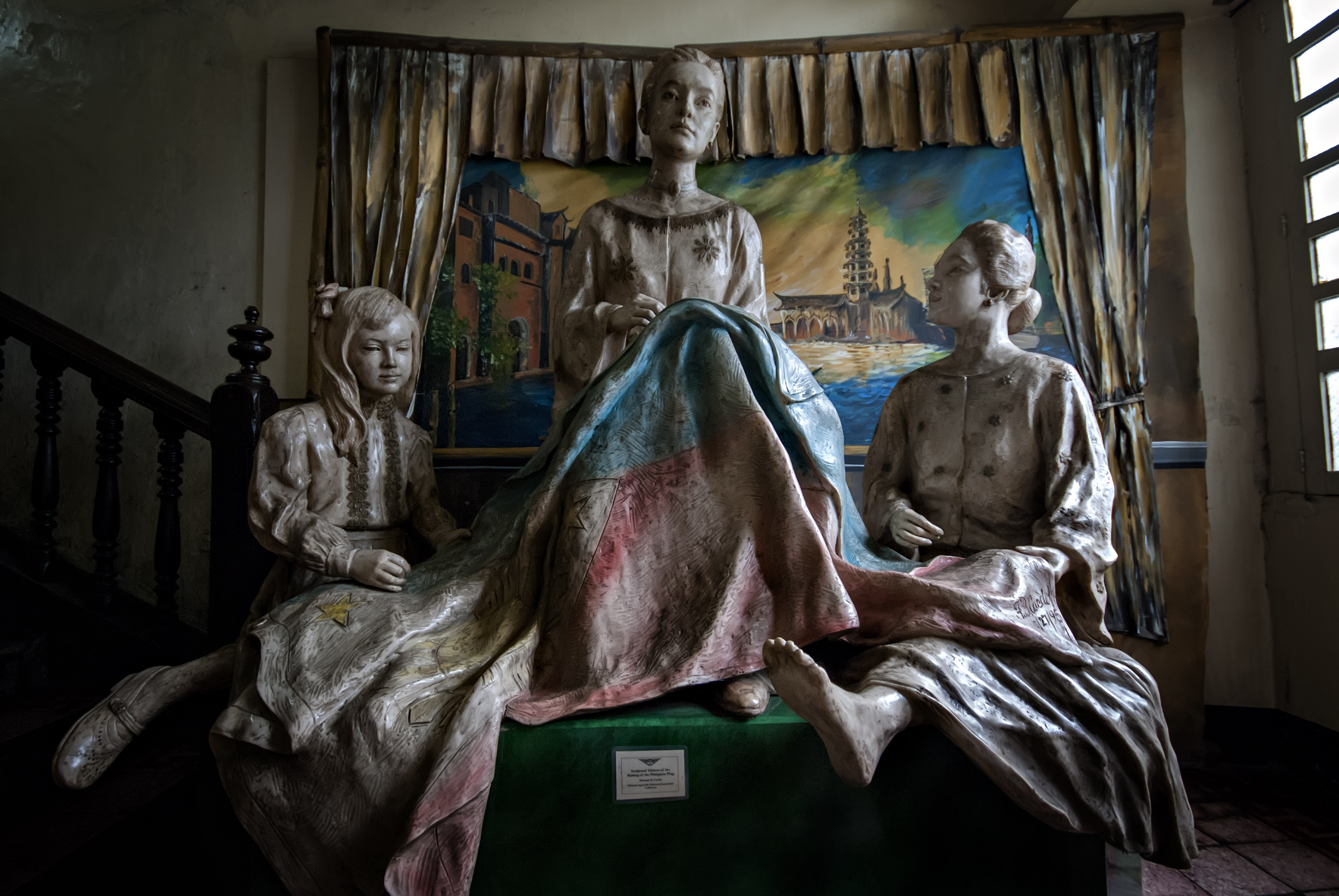
The sewing of the Philippine flag

Maria Delfina Rizal Herbosa de Natividad (December 20, 1879 – March 10, 1900) was a Filipino renowned for being one of the three women, together with Marcela Agoncillo and her daughter Lorenza, who seamed together the Philippine flag, and for being the niece of the National Hero of the Philippines, José Rizal.

== Early life ==
Maria Delfina Rizal Herbosa was born on December 20, 1879, in Calamba, Laguna to Mariano Herbosa and Lucia Rizal, sister of José Rizal, and she was of Spanish and Chinese descent. At the age of thirteen, she joined the Katipunan because of her desire to fight oppression after her father was denied a Christian burial by the Spanish friars because of the claim that he did not go to confession, although the apparent reason was that they were related to José Rizal, whose novel Noli me Tangere exposed the abuses of the Spaniards.

== Marriage and making of the Philippine flag ==
Delfina was married to Jose Salvador Alejandrino Natividad, whom she met in the Katipunan, and who later became a general of the Philippine Revolution. She then accompanied her husband to his self-exile to Hong Kong, where she was asked by Marcela Agoncillo to help her and her daughter sew together the Philippine flag.

== Death ==
Natividad and her husband had a daughter together named Paz, who died at the age of two due to an alcohol lamp falling on her, this caused Natividad much sorrow and mental anguish, thus causing her death at the age of 20. Her death certificate states that she died on 11 March 1900 at 10 AM in her residence along Paseo de Azcarraga, Manila. The attending physician, Trinidad Pardo de Tavera, noted that she died of asystole. Her remains were interred in the wall niches of Paco Cemetery (written as Nicho Paco in the death certificate). The location of her grave has not been identified.

== In popular culture ==
- Portrayed by Jenny Javier in the 2012 film, El Presidente.
