= Lorenza Agoncillo =

One of the 3 girls who made the Philippine flag and the daughter of Marcela Agoncillo

Lorenza Mariño de Agoncillo
- Born: September 5, 1890; Taal, Batangas, Captaincy General of the Philippines
- Died: September 2, 1972 (aged 81); Manila, Philippines
- Resting place: Santuario del Santo Cristo
- Other names: Enchang, Doña Lorenza
- Education: Philippine Normal School
- Occupations: Patriot and Educator
- Known for: daughter of the principle seamstress of the first and official Philippine flag
- Parent(s): Don Felipe Agoncillo; Marcela Agoncillo

Lorenza Mariño Agoncillo (September 5, 1890 – September 2, 1972) was the daughter of Don Felipe Agoncillo and Marcela Agoncillo who became the daughter of the principle seamstress of the first and official Philippine flag.

== Early life ==
Born on September 5, 1890, in Taal, Batangas, she was the eldest daughter of Felipe Agoncillo, a lawyer who later became a diplomat in the first Philippine Republic, and Marcela Marino, who belonged to one of the distinguished families of Taal.

She was one of the three women who made the first Philippine flag. As the story goes, around March or April 1898, Aguinaldo requested Marcela Agoncillo to make the Philippine flag according to a design, inspired by the Cuban flag, given by the revolutionary committee. Lorenza, then seven years old, helped her mother in sewing the flag together with Rizal's niece, Delfina Herbosa Natividad. The task was finished in five days. Aguinaldo took the flag with him when he sailed back to the Philippines on the U.S. transport McCulloch after the defeat of the Spanish fleet in Manila Bay. It was waved from the window of Aguinaldo's house in Kawit, Cavite after he declared the independence of the Philippines on June 12, 1898.

Lorenza was a devout Catholic. She entered the congregation of St. Paul de Chartres, intending to become a nun. However, a strange disease affecting her kidneys forced her to abandon the vocation. After recovering her health, she studied at the Philippine Normal School. She became a teacher at the Malate Catholic School, serving there for 50 years. Like her sisters, she was a cultured woman. She sang beautifully and recited with ease poems like José Rizal's “Mi último adiós” at family gatherings. The old Agoncillo house in Malate, which she shared with her sisters, revealed her fine artistic tastes. She was also known for being softhearted. She could not refuse anyone who appealed for financial help, whether deserving or not. Agoncillo lived through the hardships of the Japanese occupation and the horrors of the liberation of Manila, during which the family house was destroyed. Among the buildings that were heavily damaged in the area was the Malate Catholic School, which she sought to reopen. She became the driving force not only in restoring the school but also in managing it so it could resume its role as an educational institution. To this twin effort, she gave complete dedication.

== Later life ==
In 1967, she received a Plaque of Merit for her invaluable contributions to the school. Like her parents, Agoncillo was patriotic and well – bred. Her dignity was an inspiration to both her colleagues and the thousands of students who passed under her care.

=== Death ===
She died on September 2, 1972, three days short of her 82nd birthday.

== In popular culture ==
- Portrayed by Jhulia Ejercito and Leah Villalon in the 2012 film, El Presidente.

== See also ==
- Betsy Ross
