= Marcela Agoncillo =

Seamstress of the first flag of the Philippines

Doña Marcela Mariño Agoncillo
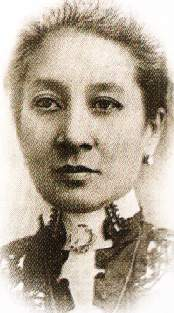
- Born: Marcela Coronel Mariño; June 24, 1859; Taal, Batangas, Captaincy General of the Philippines
- Died: May 30, 1946 (aged 86); Taal, Batangas, Philippine Commonwealth
- Resting place: Santuario del Santo Cristo
- Other names: Doña Marcela, Lola Celay
- Education: Santa Catalina College
- Known for: Her legacy as the Mother of the Philippine Flag and principal seamstress of the first and official Philippine flag
- Spouse: Don Felipe Encarnacion Agoncillo
- Children: 6 (incl. Lorenza Agoncillo)

Doña Marcela Mariño de Agoncillo (née Mariño y Coronel; June 24, 1859 – May 30, 1946) was a Filipina who was the principal seamstress of the first and official flag of the Philippines, gaining her the title of "The Mother of the Philippine Flag."

Marcela Coronel Mariño was the daughter of Don Francisco Diokno Mariño and Doña Eugenia Coronel Mariño, a rich family in her hometown of Taal, Batangas. She finished her studies at Santa Catalina College, Marcela acquired her learning in music and feminine crafts. At the age of 30, Marcela Coronel Mariño married Felipe Encarnacion Agoncillo, a Filipino lawyer, and a jurist, and gave birth to six children. Her marriage led an important role in Philippine history. When her husband was exiled in Hong Kong during the outbreak of the Philippine Revolution, Marcela Mariño Agoncillo and the rest of the family joined him and temporarily resided there to avoid the anti-Filipino hostilities of the occupying Spain. While in Hong Kong, General Emilio Aguinaldo requested her to sew the flag that would represent the Republic of the Philippines. Doña Marcela Mariño de Agoncillo, with her eldest daughter Lorenza and a friend Delfina Herbosa de Natividad, niece of Dr. Jose Rizal, manually sewed the flag in accordance with General Emilio Aguinaldo's design which later became the official flag of the Republic of the Philippines.

While the flag itself is the perpetual legacy of Doña Marcela Mariño de Agoncillo, she is also commemorated through museums and monuments, such as the marker in Hong Kong (where her family temporarily sojourned), and her ancestral home in Taal, Batangas which has been turned into a museum (known as the Agoncillo–Mariño House). She has also been commemorated in paintings by notable painters as well as through other visual arts.

== Early life ==
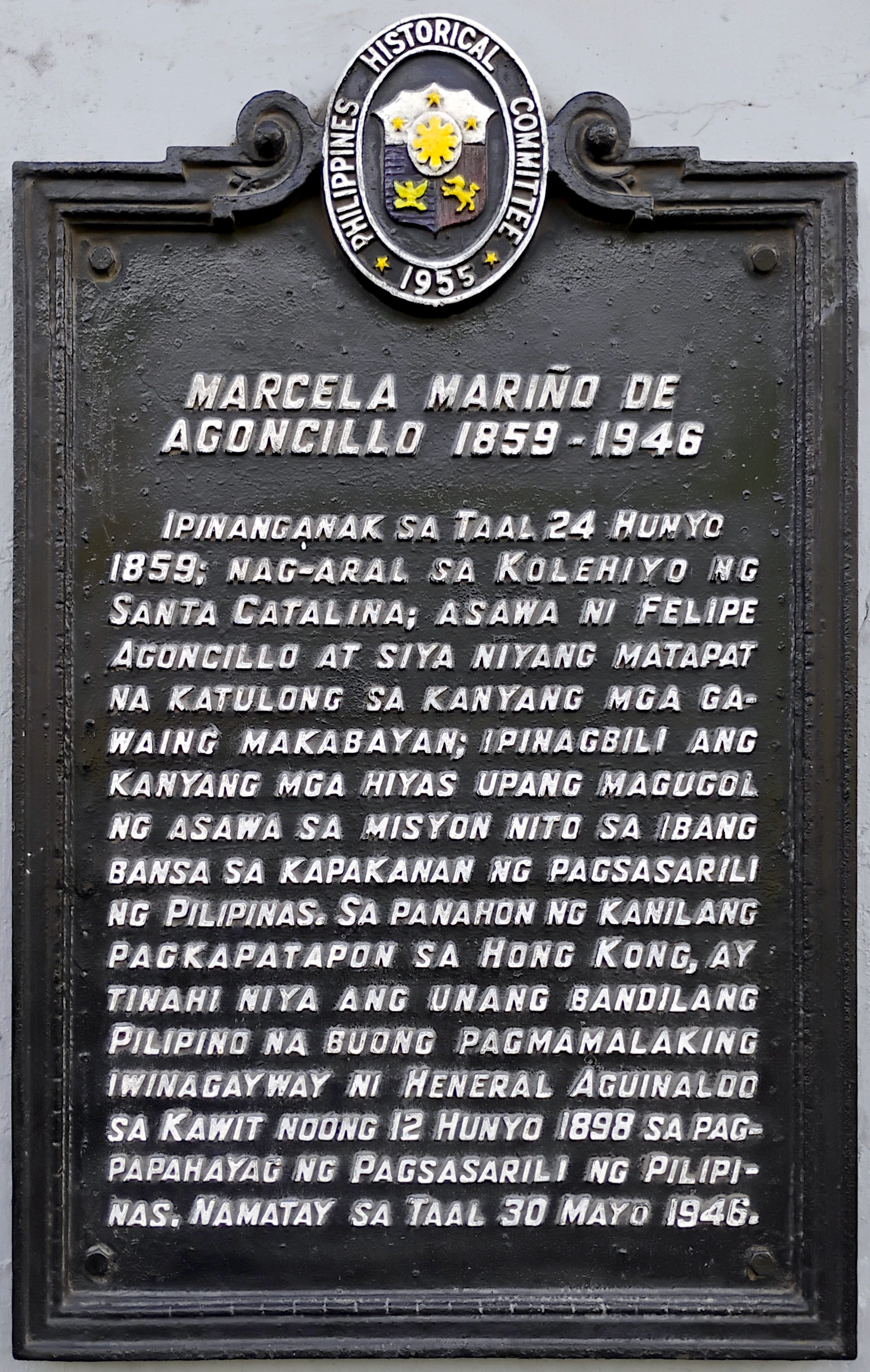
National historical marker installed in Agoncillo's house in Taal, Batangas

Marcela Coronel Mariño was born on June 24, 1859, in Taal, Batangas, Philippines to Don Francisco Diokno Mariño and Doña Eugenia Coronel Mariño. She grew up in her ancestral Mariño house in Taal, Batangas built in the 1770s by her grandparents, Don Andres Sauza Mariño and Doña Eugenia Diokno Mariño.

As a daughter of a rich and religious family, Marcela Coronel Mariño was referred to in their town as Roselang Bubog which means "a virgin enthroned in the town church".

Marcela Coronel Mariño was sent to a convent after her education in Manila. The convent she was studying in was the Santa Catalina College of the Dominican nuns, an exclusive school for girls, established in the Walled City of Intramuros where she finished her elementary and secondary education. In college, she learned Spanish, music, the feminine crafts and social graces. She spent her girlhood partly in their hometown and partly in the convent. Accordingly, Marcela was skilled in needlework.

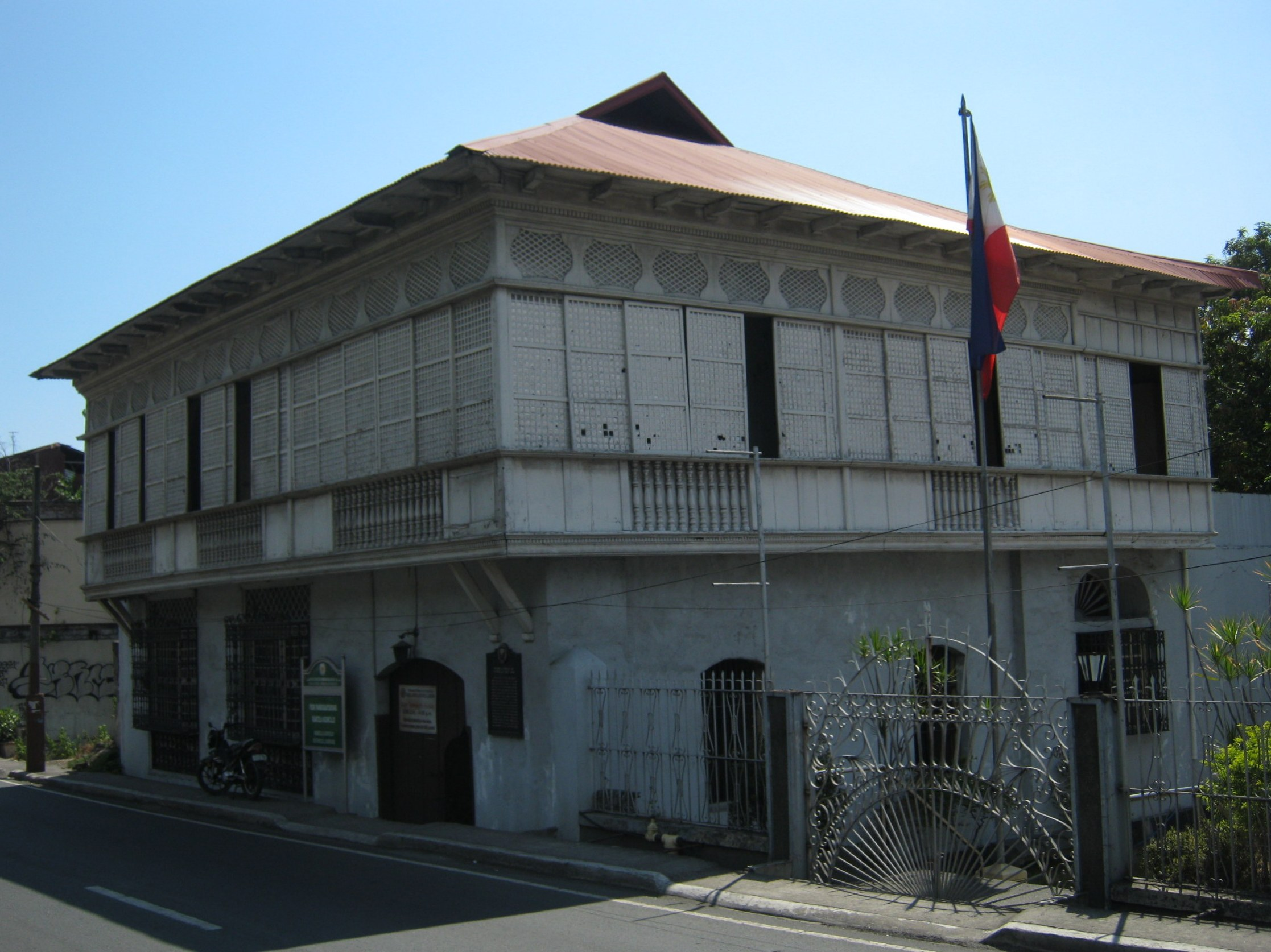
Ancestral House of Marcela Mariño de Agoncillo in Taal, Batangas

== Marriage and family ==
Marcela Coronel Mariño was married to Felipe Encarnacion Agoncillo, a Filipino lawyer, and a jurist. They were both thirty and Felipe was already a judge when they finally married. The Agoncillo moved from Taal to Manila, where they lived together in a two-story house on M.H. del Pillar St., Malate, near the Malate church.

Six daughters were born to them: Lorenza ("Enchang"), Gregoria ("Goring"), Eugenia ("Nene"), Marcela ("Celing", named after her mother because they thought she would be their last child), Adela (who died at the age of three) and the youngest, Maria ("Maring", who was their last surviving child and died on July 6, 1995). Most of her daughters became teachers. Gregoria Mariño Agoncillo was the first Filipina to graduate from Oxford University. After the graduation of the three elder daughters, they were offered to positions to teach. Lorenza was given an appointment to teach in Malate Catholic School. They so immersed themselves in the respective teaching careers that not one of them chose to be married. However, Maria Mariño Agoncillo married Leoncio Noble later on in life, with children: Anita Mariño Agoncillo Noble (Miss Philippines 1926), Froila Mariño Agoncillo Noble and Vicente Mariño Agoncillo Noble. Doña Marcela Mariño de Agoncillo cared for all of her daughters until they reached maturity. One of her favorite pieces of advice to them was to "live honestly and well, and to work hard and not depend on family property.

Besides the legal services rendered by Felipe to the impoverished, Doña Marcela Mariño Agoncillo and her daughters observed every Thursday as a day of charity, when a queue of needy people seeking alms would form in the Agoncillo driveway. No one ever left their house empty-handed. Agoncillo would hand them a bag of rice in addition to the money she gave them. This practice lasted until the couple retired.

== Exile in Hong Kong ==
After learning of the plans of the Governor-General of the Philippines (Basilio Augustin y Davila) to deport Don Felipe Encarnacion Agoncillo, he sailed to Yokohama, Japan, staying there only briefly until proceeding to Hong Kong where he joined other Filipino exiles who found asylum when the revolution broke out in 1896. Twenty-two months after the departure of Don Felipe Encarnacion Agoncillo for Hong Kong, the Agoncillos and the rest of the family (her last two daughters were not yet born) followed him into exile. They rented a house at 535 Morrison Hill in the Wan Chai district. While in Hong Kong, Agoncillo gave birth to their last child on March 22, 1906.

Don Felipe Encarnacion Agoncillo, being an exile himself, received any Filipino who came into their house. Thereafter, the place became a sanctuary for other Filipino revolutionary exiles. They initiated meetings in the Agoncillo's residence, especially during the critical months of March and April 1898. Among these folks were Gen. Antonio Luna and General Emilio Aguinaldo. Also, Josephine Bracken, Jose Rizal's fiancée, sought refuge in their house when the Spanish authorities threatened to torture her.

=== The Making of the Philippine flag ===
The detail of Fernando Amorsolo's The Making of the Philippine flag depicting Agoncillo and company's manual sewing

After the signing of the Pact of Biak-na-Bato on December 14, 1897, General Emilio Aguinaldo visited the Agoncillo residence in Hong Kong after their voluntary exile. After having met them, General Emilio Aguinaldo requested that Doña Marcela Mariño de Agoncillo immediately hand-sew a flag according to his design which would embody the national aspirations of all Filipinos. After receiving the request, Doña Marcela Mariño Agoncillo delegated her eldest daughter, five-year-old Lorenza Mariño Agoncillo, and Mrs. Delfina Herbosa Natividad, Dr.José Rizal's niece by his sister Lucia, to help her make the first Philippine flag.

The process took only a short time, but it was difficult. The three worked manually and with the aid of a sewing machine. They had to redo the flag after the rays of the sun were not in the proper direction. Their eyes and hands suffered due to the prolonged work session. Made from 100% fine silk which she bought in Hong Kong, the flag was embroidered in gold and contained stripes of blue and red and a white triangle with the sun and three stars on it. The flag was finished in five days and became known as "The Three Stars and a Sun flag".

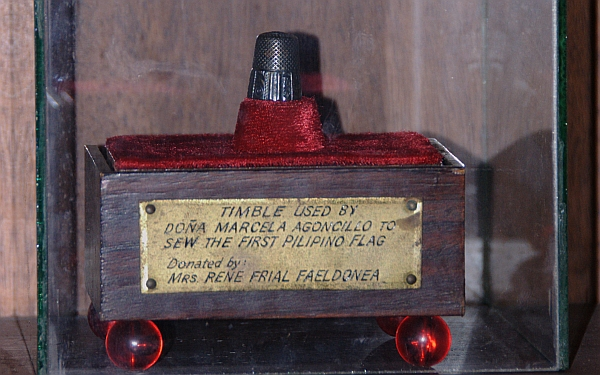
The thimble used by Doña Marcela Mariño de Agoncillo in sewing the first Philippine flag; on display at Presidential Museum & Library.

On May 17, 1898, the flag was delivered personally by Agoncillo and was packed among the things President Emilio Aguinaldo brought back to Manila. This flag was hoisted from the window of Aguinaldo's house in Kawit, Cavite, during the proclamation of Philippine independence on June 12, 1898, accompanied by the Philippine National Anthem Marcha Filipina. However, she did not witness either this first public display of the flag or the time when the flag was unfurled during the Malolos Congress because her husband remained in Hong Kong and she remained with him.

In response to the message written by General Emilio Aguinaldo, Doña Marcela Mariño de Agoncillo wrote the following statement when she was interviewed:

In the house at 535 Morrison Hill, where I lived with my family, exiled from our country on account of the national cause, I had the good fortune to make the first Philippine flag under the direction of an illust[r]ious leader Gen. Emilio Aguinaldo y Famy...It took me five days to make that National Flag, and when completed, I myself delivered it to Gen. Emilio Aguinaldo before boarding the transport McCullo[ug]h...Gen. Aguinaldo is the best witness who can give the information whether or not that flag was the first to be displayed in Cavite at the beginning of the revolutionary government against the government of Spain in these islands.

— Marcela Agoncillo

== Post-exile and death ==
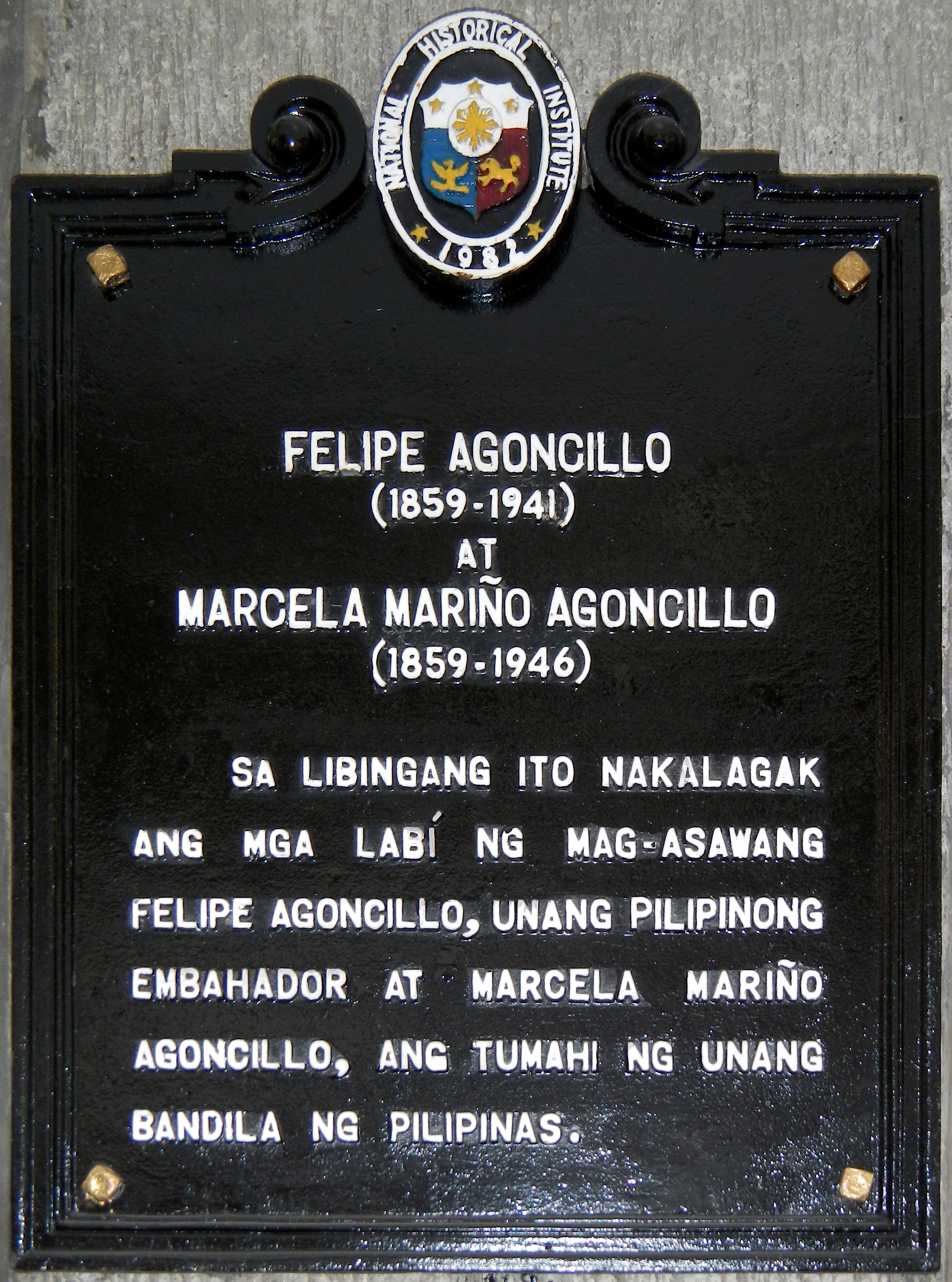
National Historical Institute historical marker commemorating the burial place of Felipe and Marcela Agoncillo inside the Santuario del Santo Cristo in San Juan, Metro Manila

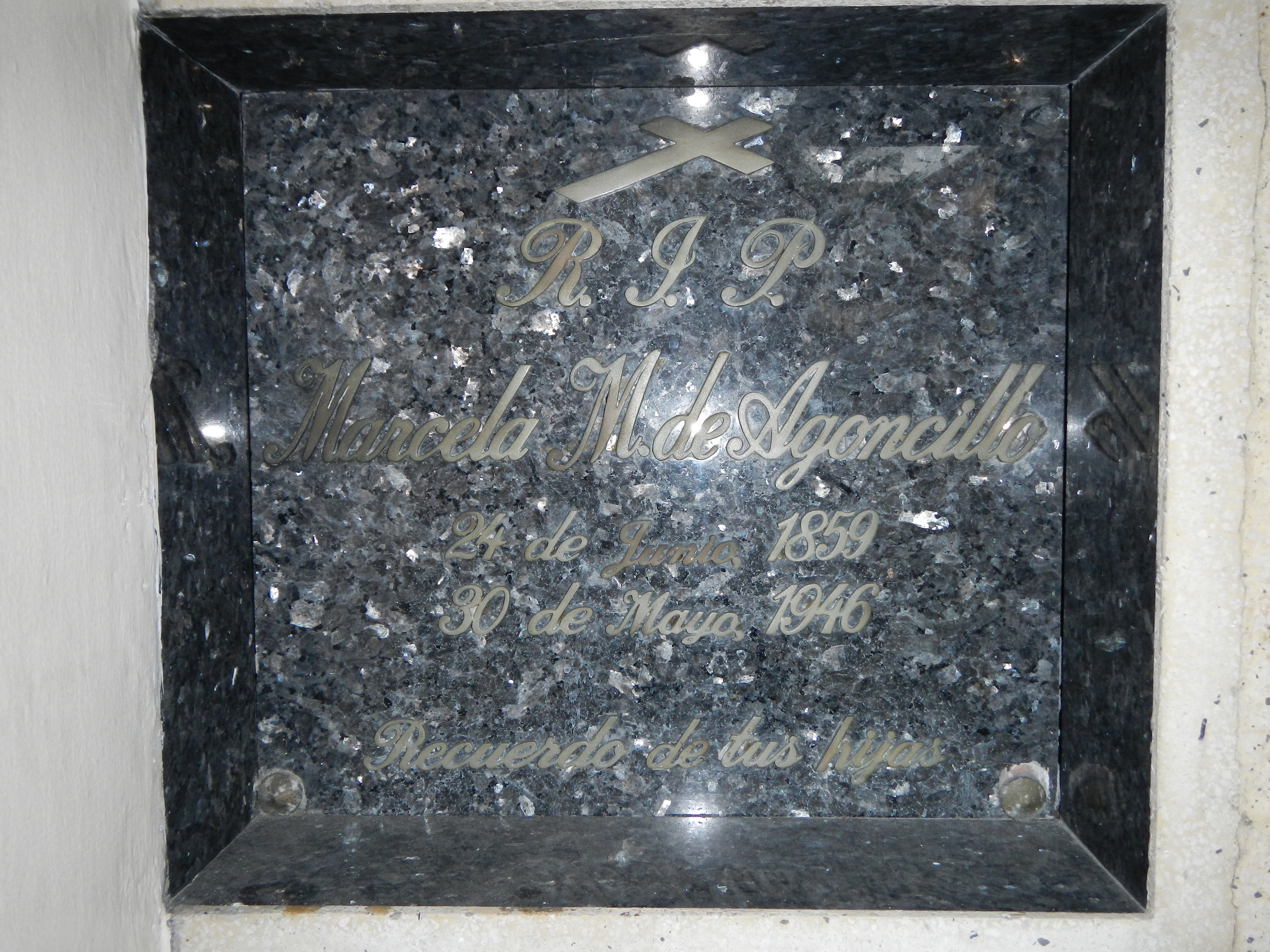
Grave of Marcela Mariño de Agoncillo in Cemetery adjoining Santuario del Santo Cristo

Doña Marcela Mariño de Agoncillo and her daughters stayed in Hong Kong from 1895 to 1906. She took care of their house, which became an asylum. Their funds had run out because of the heavy expenses incurred by Don Felipe for his diplomatic activities in France and in the United States. She once had to sell the children's pinafores and their jewels to support her family and to pay for their voyage back to Manila. The other money was also used to help boost the revolutionary funds. Their support for the revolution made them an impoverished family; however, they gained it back when Felipe resumed his legal practice.

After the fall of the first Philippine Republic and the establishment of the American regime, Doña Marcela Mariño de Agoncillo and her family ended their exile and went back to Manila as soon as they were fetched by Don Felipe after his diplomatic activities abroad had ended. The Agoncillos settled in their family house in Malate. After the death of Don Felipe, Agoncillo's remaining family suffered from starvation due to their meager supply of food, water and other needs. The Japanese conquerors also contributed to their anguish during the period of the Japanese invasion. Taking this all in stride, Marcela remained pragmatic and a source of inspiration. After their house was incinerated during the Japanese occupation, all she said to her remaining daughters was "We will then have to go to Taal."

Though she endured the 1945 Battle of Manila, the health of Doña Marcela Mariño de Agoncillo, who was alternatively called Marcela and "Lola Celay" during her old age, was steadily deteriorating. She continued to mourn her deceased husband to such an extent that her daughters found it necessary to hide all his remaining photographs. On May 30, 1946, she quietly died in Taal at the age of 86. Her remains were brought from Taal to Manila and interred alongside her husband in the Catholic cemetery of La Loma according to the wishes of her last will. Their remains were later transferred to Santuario del Santo Cristo in San Juan, Metro Manila.

== Commemoration ==
Several commemorative figures were created in remembrance of Agoncillo's historic family. On November 27, 1955, a marker was erected by the National Historical Institute of the Philippines and a museum was established in Taal, Batangas in accordance with her last wish and was named Marcela Mariño de Agoncillo Museum and Monument. The museum is Mariño-Agoncillo's ancestral house. The house-turned-museum permanently exhibits flags and a diorama depicting the sewing of the first flag. A bronze statue of her holding the flag was erected outside the house in its garden. In Hong Kong, a historical marker was created by the Hong Kong Antiquities Council at Morrison Hill Park to commemorate the site where the first Philippine flag was sewn. However, the place where the Agoncillos resided, the location of the Hong Kong Junta, and other locations of historical importance to Filipinos remain unmarked.

Doña Marcela Mariño de Agoncillo's legacy is remembered through the visual arts as well. In 1996, Filipino National Artist Napoleon Abueva created the concrete and marble sculpture Three Women Weaving the Filipino Flag at the UP Diliman to commemorate Agoncillo and the other two women who assisted her in their important task. Moreover, the Marcela Agoncillo Elementary School is made to honor her. Renowned Filipino painter Fernando Amorsolo painted the historical sewing and is nationally known as The Making of the Philippine flag.

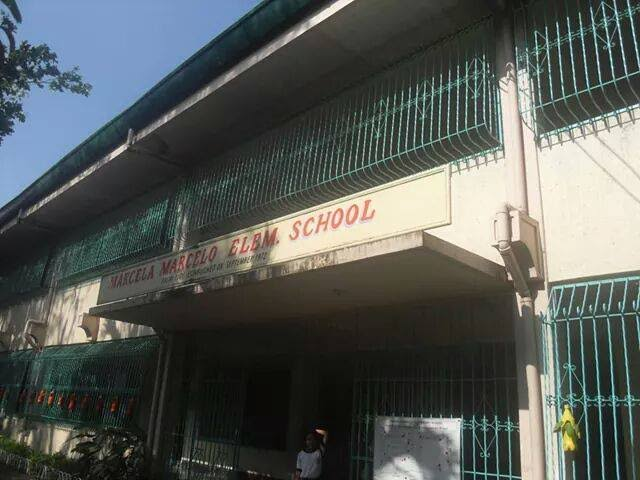
Old Marcela Agoncillo Elementary School Building

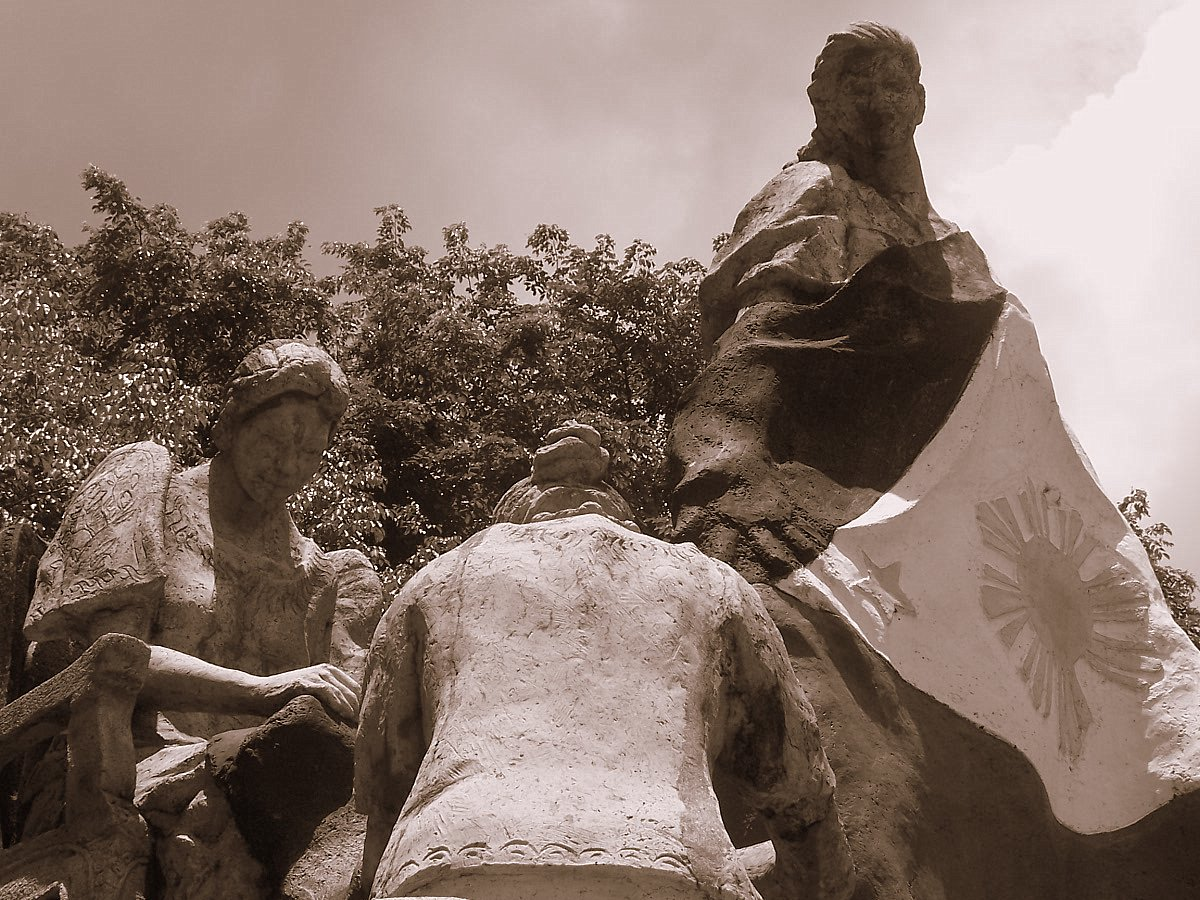
Three Women Weaving the Filipino Flag monument by Napoleon V. Abueva erected in UP Diliman campus to commemorate the historical sewing

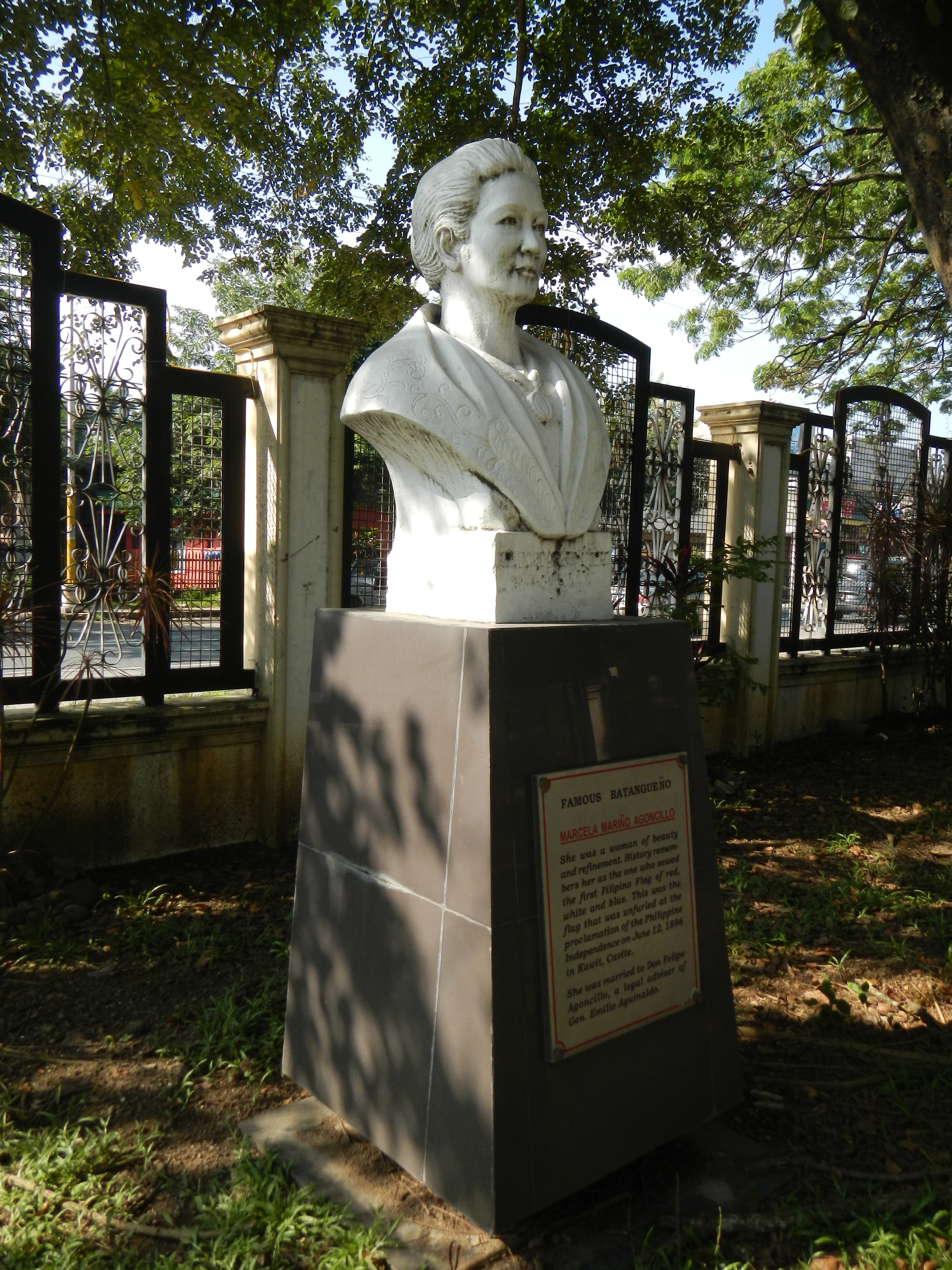
Marcela Mariño Agoncillo bust (Batangas Provincial Capitol)

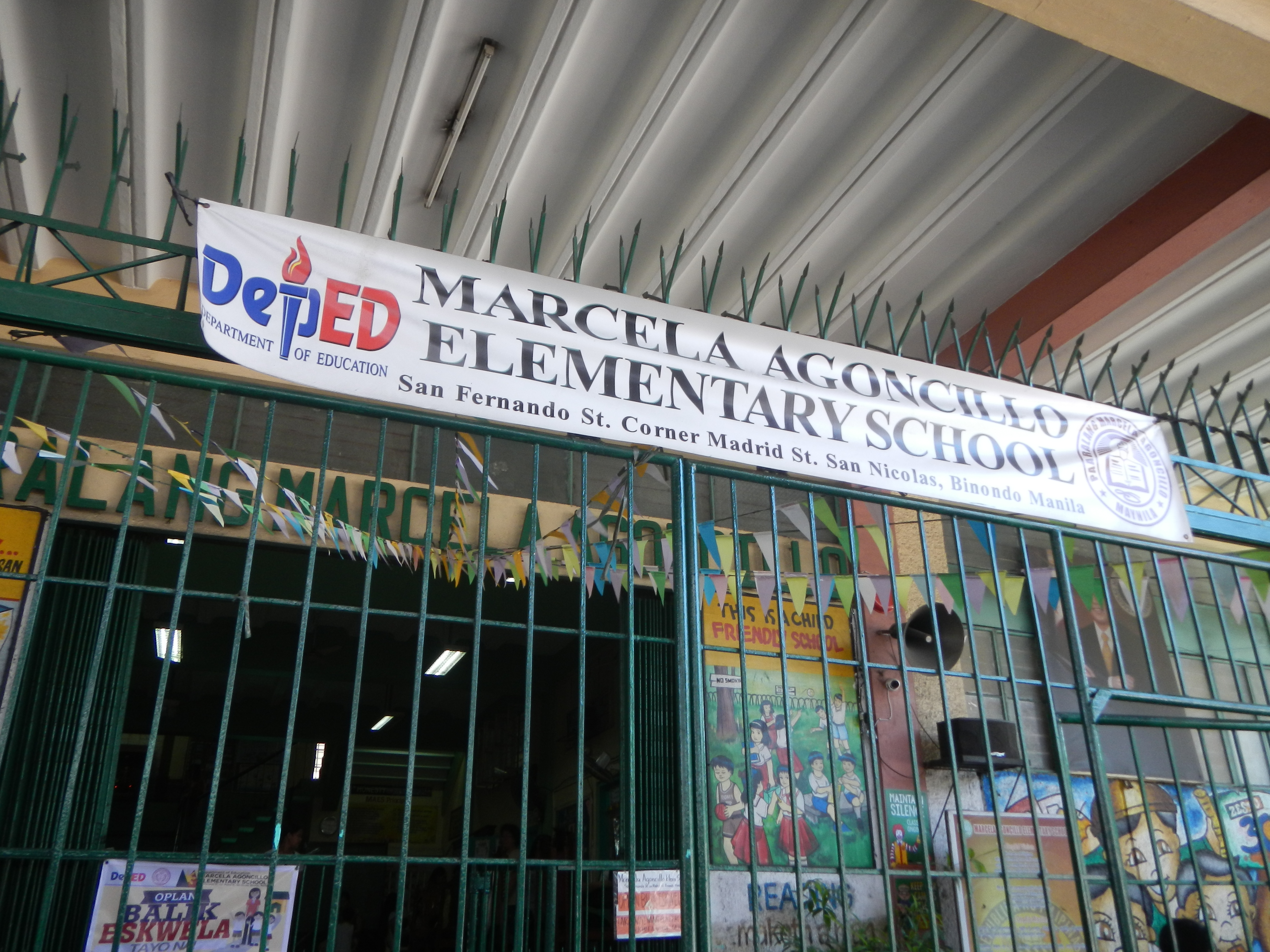
Marcela Agoncillo Elementary School, San Nicolas, Manila

== See also ==
- Lorenza Agoncillo
