= Santuario del Santo Cristo =

Roman Catholic church in Metro Manila, Philippines

- Santuario del Santo Cristo Parish
- Church of San Juan del Monte
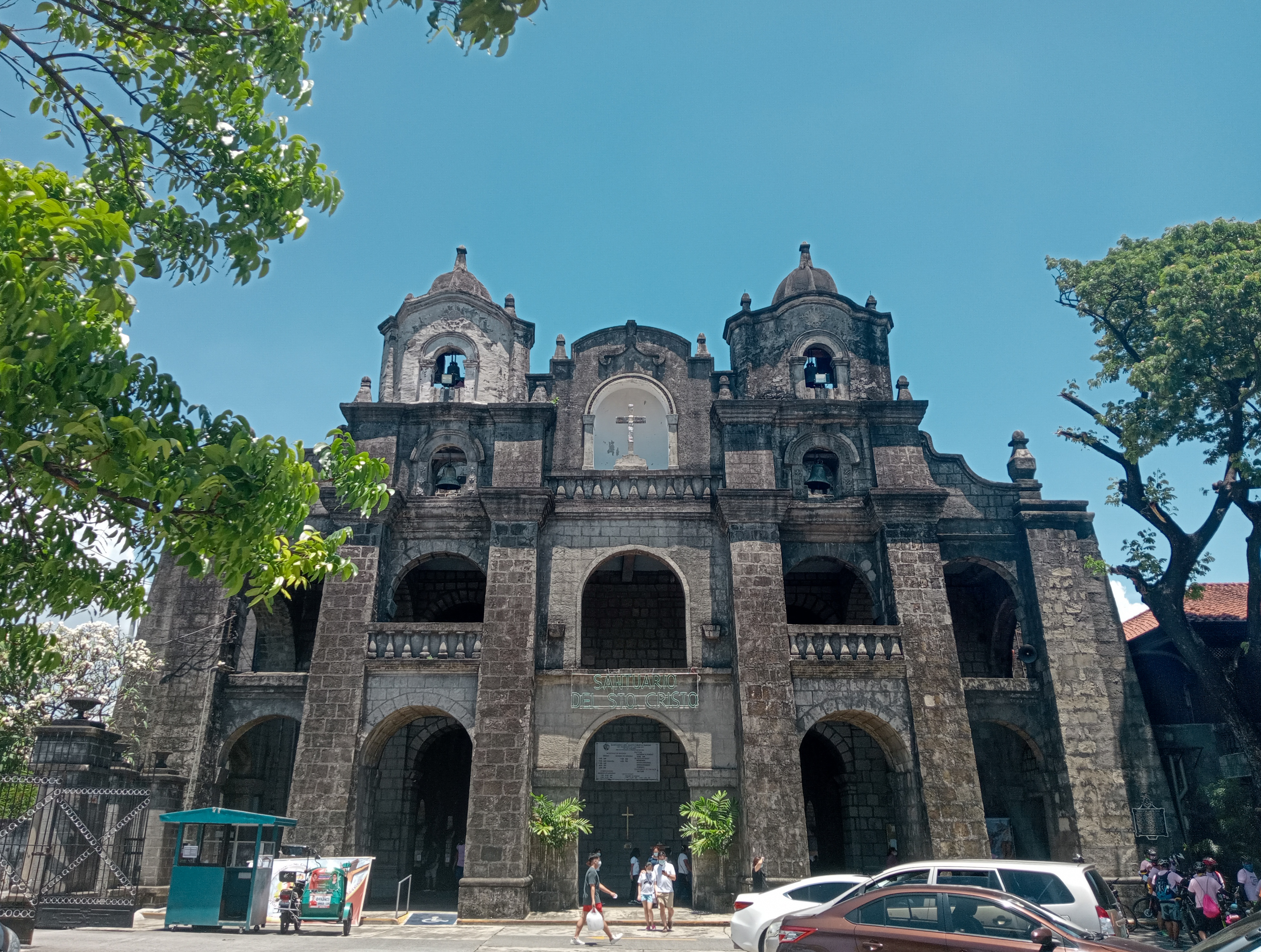
- West façade of the shrine in 2022
- Santuario del Santo Cristo
- 14°35′54″N 121°01′50″E
- Location: 183 F. Blumentritt St., San Juan, Metro Manila
- Country: Philippines
- Denomination: Roman Catholic
- Website: santuariosantocristo.com

History
- Founded: 1602
- Founder: Dominicans
- Dedication: Holy Cross

Architecture
- Functional status: Active
- Heritage designation: Historic structure
- Designated: 1937
- Architectural type: Church building
- Style: Earthquake Baroque

Specifications
- Materials: stone, cement

Administration
- Archdiocese: Roman Catholic Archdiocese of Manila
- Deanery: Saint John the Baptist
- Parish: Santuario del Sto. Cristo Parish

Clergy
- Archbishop: Jose Advincula

Santuario del Santo Cristo Parish, also known as the Church of San Juan del Monte, is a church and convento in San Juan, Metro Manila, Philippines. It is under the jurisdiction of the Archdiocese of Manila. The church was built in 1602–1604 by the Dominicans on land that was donated to the order. Both the church and convento were burnt and destroyed during the Chinese insurrection of 1639, and later rebuilt in 1641. It was again destroyed in July 1763 as Britain briefly occupied Manila during the Seven Years' War. The current church and convento were built in 1774, and used as a shelter by Katipuneros during the 1898 Philippine Revolution against the Spanish Empire. It has since been renovated many times until the 1990s.

Pope Urban VIII granted approbation towards the shrine, notarized on March 4, 1648. The shrine is the seat of the Confraternity of the Most Holy Christ of Saint John of the Mountain (Spanish: Cofradia del Santísimo Cristo de San Juan del Monte).

== History ==
=== Arrival of the Dominicans ===
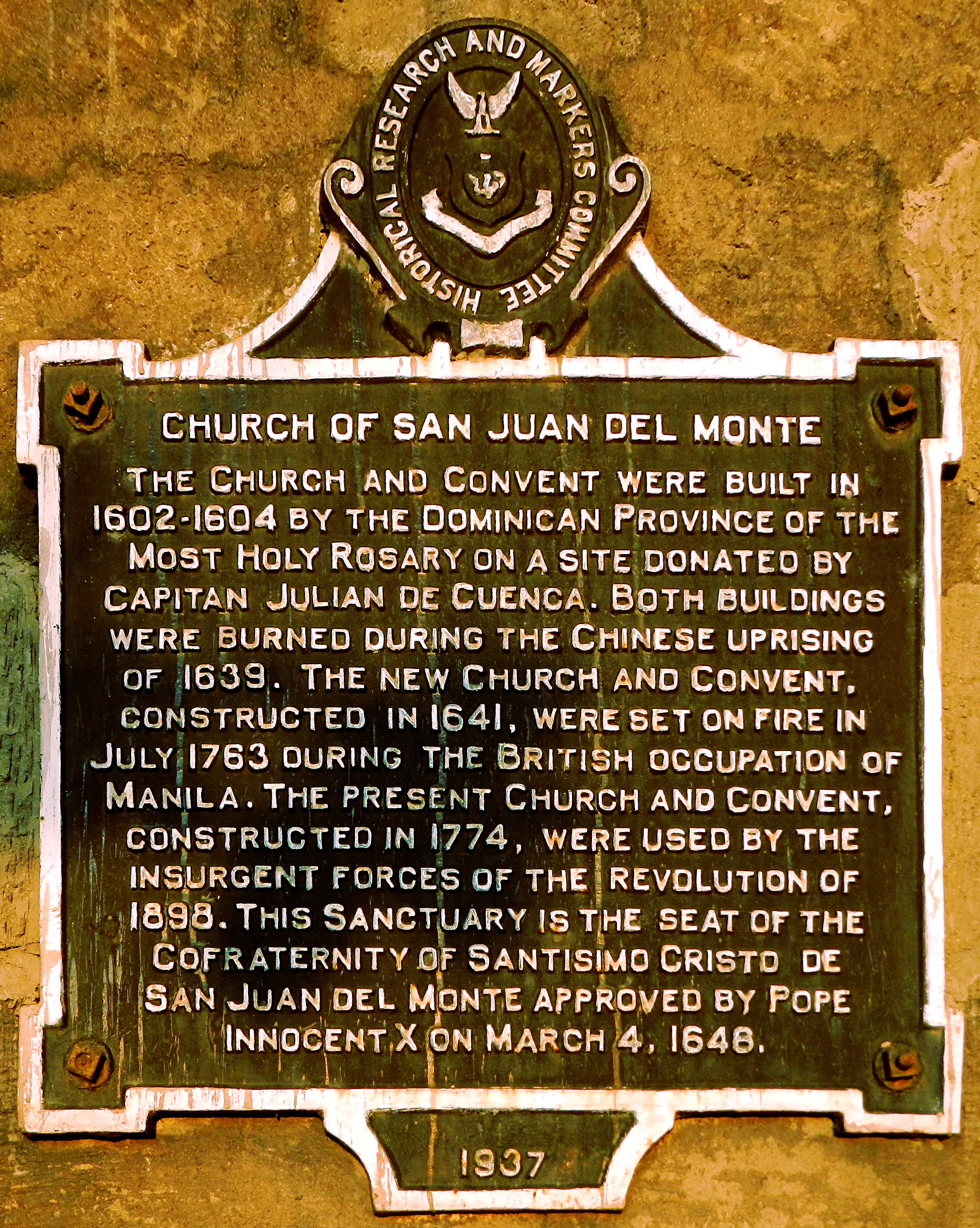
Church HRMC historical marker installed in 1937

The Dominicans arrived in the Spanish East Indies in 1587 and had founded the Santo Domingo Convent in Spanish Manila (now known as Intramuros). Fifteen years after their arrival, the Dominicans went to the hill country east of Manila in what is now San Juan, and found clusters of small nipa huts. The area was the property of a certain Spaniard named Captain Julian de Cuenca, who had been granted an encomienda along the banks of the San Juan River where cattle were bred and raised.

The heavy work and hot climate were taking their toll on some of the ageing friars, who had been in the colony for several years already. While the order's vow of poverty stood in contrast with the concept of a convalescent and retirement home for Dominicans working in Manila and in the provinces, it was decided that it would be in order under three conditions:

1. The land would have to be donated;
2. It should be in a healthy place, with a climate cooler than Manila's; and
3. Nearness to and accessibility from Manila

It so happened that Captain Cuenca had heard about the Dominicans' plan; he lived in Manila and before that Mexico, where he had befriended some of the Order's members. He and his wife thought it the right time to show their family's gratitude to the Dominicans, and so they offered a nearly three-hectare plot of wooded land in his hacienda along the San Juan River. The property was at a higher elevation than Manila and close to the city ("one legua", or 5 kilometres (3.1 mi) to the east). It was also easily accessible by banca (outrigger canoe): up the River Pasig, then into the San Juan River and finally landing at the embarcadero Captain Cuenca had built at the confluence of the San Juan and Maytunas Creek.

The Order gratefully accepted the offer, and the work began, with a small chapel to San Juan Bautista del Monte built after several months. At first, it was a "filial house" of the friary in Manila, from where it was administered, until it became a religious house in its own right in 1616. Independent of Santo Domingo Convent, it was then called the House of San Juan Bautista del Monte. Fathers Huete, Oriol, and Samaniego were assigned to the new house in 1617.

=== Arrival of the Santo Cristo ===
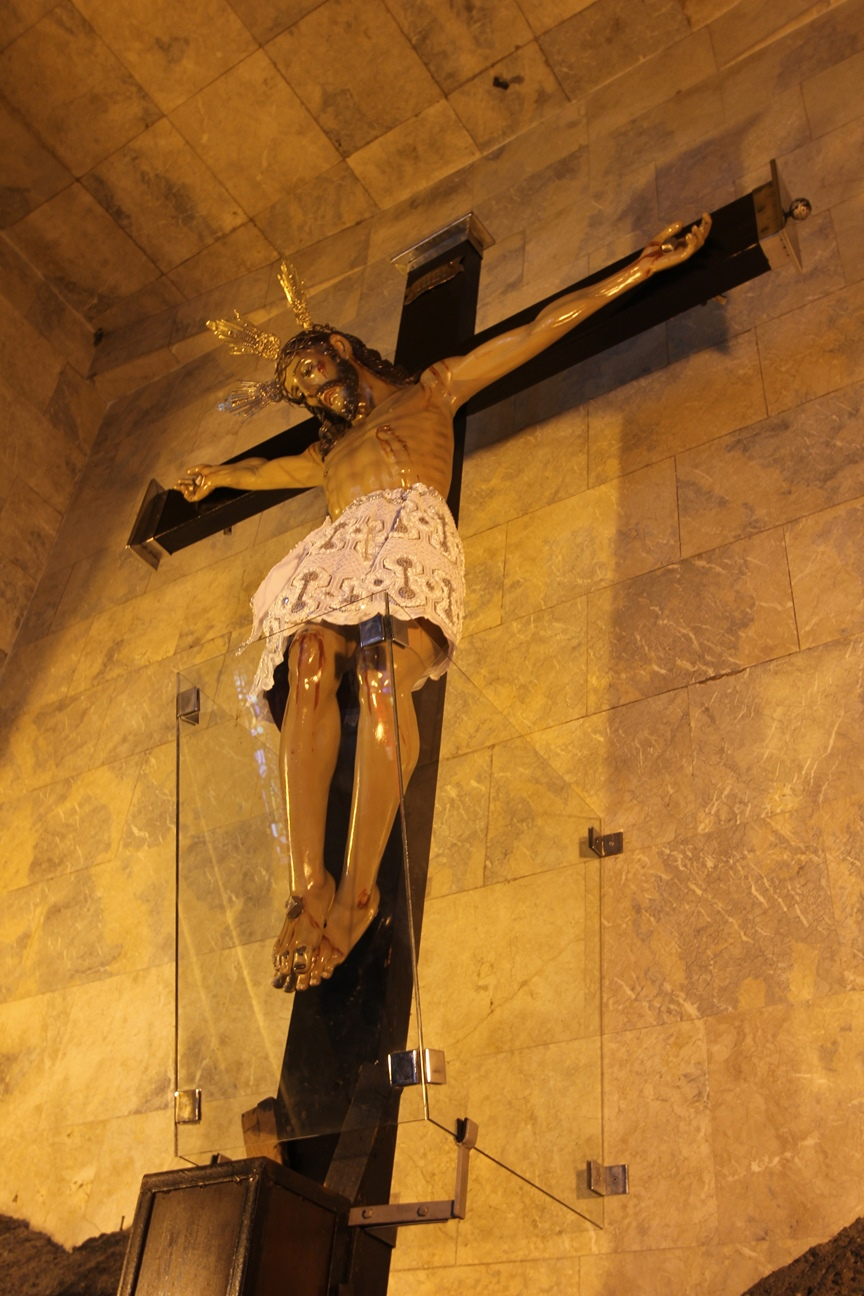
The Santo Cristo image, its feet encased in glass, in the Calvario above the main altar

In 1641, Fr Sebastián de Oquendo, OP, the Prior of Santo Domingo monastery in Intramuros, decided to send to San Juan the image of the Santo Cristo that was then venerated in Binondo Church (another Dominican possession). The venerable image was brought to the reconstructed church in San Juan and placed on the main altar, displacing the image of John the Baptist, since the image, which was "nine palmos in height" (approx. 1.80 metres (5 ft 11 in)) would not fit. From then on, devotion to the Santo Cristo spread to nearby communities. The shrine itself gained popularity when the image began to perform miracles, thus earning the shrine the name Santuario del Santo Cristo. News of the image's miracles spread to Manila and the surrounding areas, particularly the neighbouring Franciscan parish and town of Santa Ana, to which the present-day cities of San Juan and Mandaluyong were once villages.

The Confraternity of the Santo Cristo was established and approved by Pope Innocent X in 1648, roughly 45 years after the arrival of the Dominicans in San Juan. Prominent citizens of Manila and other towns became members of the Confraternity and made yearly pilgrimages to the shrine. Others decided to settle in the vicinity of the shrine, forming the nucleus of the present city of San Juan.

=== Feast Day ===
The local feast day of the Santo Cristo is observed every May 3, the former date of Roodmas. On this day, the image is removed from the Calvario and mounted on a carroza (carriage) for the procession and then returned to its shrine. Since 2016, a replica has been used for the public processions at the request of Fr. Jesus Prol, after cracks were seen in the original image that had been in procession for many years.

=== The Convento and Santuario ===
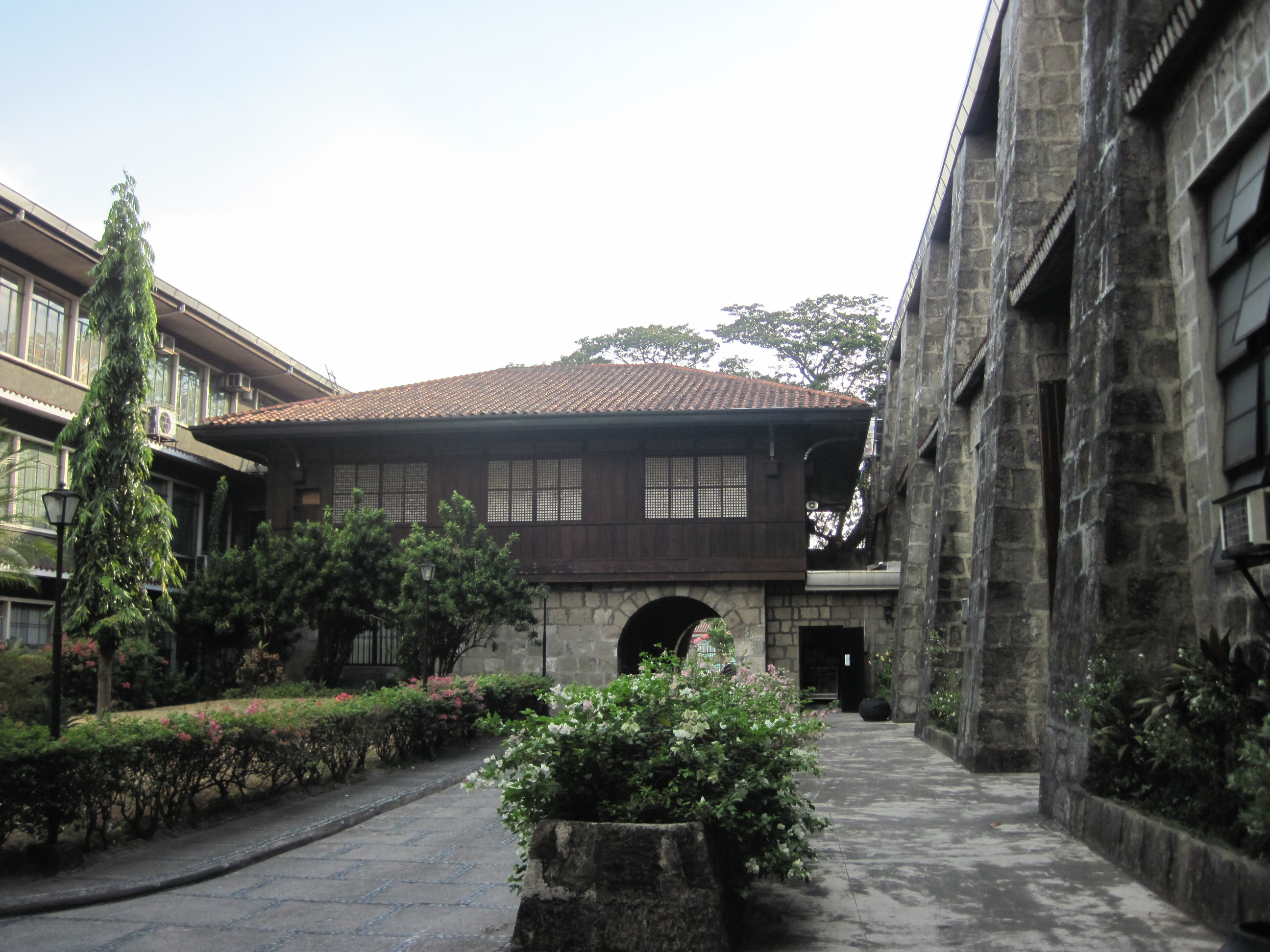
Convento entrance and southeastern flank of the shrine, facing southwest

The first convento and the church on the site must have been simple and unpretentious, in keeping with the rustic surroundings, and yet well suited as places for convalescing and aged Dominicans from Manila.

In 1639, the Chinese insurrection took place in Manila, with the very first church and convento destroyed in the ensuing chaos. When the rebels were defeated by the Spanish-Filipino troops, the former retreated to Marikina and the mountains beyond, passing by San Juan. For some time the rebels occupied the convento and the church and, when they decided to flee to the mountains, torched the church complex and the few houses in the vicinity. The buildings went up in flames, the column of smoke visible from a distance for several days.

In 1641, Oquendo decided to rebuild the church and convento of San Juan using solid materials such as adobe, which was found in the area. The church became a Santuario (shrine) with the transfer of the Santo Cristo, and it increased in popularity when a spring of good drinking water was discovered within the shrine grounds. An aqueduct was built to bring the spring water from the shrine to the San Juan River, from where it was collected in big tinajas (large, porous jars that cooled water) and brought by banca (outrigger canoe) to Manila.

The buildings of the shrine complex were improved with the passage of time. A certain Fr. Peguero, who was the vicar of San Juan, described the shrine as "the biggest in the Islands and the refuge and consolation of all." He described the shrine further as "built on a mountain of solid rock and, thanks to that, it had not been damaged by earthquakes. It has been repaired well recently. It is all — the convent and the church — of stone quarry, and both are strong, firm, beautiful and devout. All in all they are the most perfect structures (of their kind) that exist in the Philippines." He further notes: "It is all painted al oleo en jaspe (imitation marble) from the floor to the ceiling and adorned with many Latin and Spanish verses and texts from the Holy Scriptures. There are three altars with artistic and proportionate retablos. It has five rich ternos — some better than others — and six ordinary ones. It has not much silver, but what it has is enough for the service of the altar."

As British troops sacked Manila in 1763, the shrine was destroyed as the city's churches and other public buildings were looted and vandalised. The shrine and the convento, along with many houses in San Juan del Monte, did not fare any better, as these were ransacked then set alight by British soldiers. After the end of the Seven Years' War and the islands' return to Spanish control, reconstruction began. It is unknown whether the present image is the same one brought from Binondo, or a replica.

=== Founding of the parish ===
Negotiations on elevating the shrine's status to that of a parish began in 1941 between Michael J. O'Doherty, the 27th Archbishop of Manila, and the Dominicans. The creation of the Santuario del Santo Cristo Parish and its bounds were agreed upon at a meeting in the Archbishop's Palace on November 4, 1941. Present there was the parish priests of Pinaglabanan and Mandaluyong, from which the territory of the new parish would be excised. Before the resolution could be put into effect, however, the Second World War broke out in the Pacific in December 1941. The following year, Imperial Japan occupied the islands and established the Second Republic.

The parish was canonically erected on May 3, 1942, fifty years after the establishment of Saint John the Baptist Parish at Pinaglabanan. Fr. Peregrine de la Fuente OP, formerly parish priest for 18 years in Dominican ministries of Louisiana in the United States and later the first Apostolic Prelate of Batanes and the Babuyanes, was appointed first parish priest.

The official inauguration of the parish and the installation of its parish priest was led by Archbishop O'Doherty, in a ceremony coinciding with the Feast of the Holy Cross, the shrine's titular. In the decree for erection, signed on March 28, 1942, the parish bounds were set as: to the north, R. Pascual Street and its continuation eastwards to the Ermitaño Creek (also known as Salapán Creek); to the west, San Juan River; to the southwest, Shaw Boulevard; and to the east, Ermitaño Creek. Archbishop O'Doherty said that he erected the new parish due to "the insistence of the people of San Juan, for several years already that the Santuario be made a Parish, the great increase in population and the request of the Parish Priest of Pinaglabanan Church himself, Father Artemio Casas".

=== 75th (diamond) anniversary as a parish ===
The shrine celebrated its diamond jubilee as a parish in 2017. The yearlong celebration began on Saturday, March 4, 2017, with recitation of the rosary and a concelebrated Mass. The date was chosen as it was the anniversary of the May 3, 1942, reception of the decree of erection signed by Archbishop O'Doherty. Though signed earlier, its delivery was hampered by the Second World War and other transportation issues.

=== Timeline of the present Santuario ===
- February 16, 1963 – The cornerstone of the new Santuario was blessed by Cardinal Rufino Santos, the 29th Archbishop of Manila. The stone, together with other documents, was kept in a concrete box and displayed to the public for eight years. On September 8, 1971, it was finally buried beneath the main altar.
- November 13–14, 1967 – Arte Español, Inc. delivered ten chandeliers to the shrine, which were immediately installed.
- January 9, 1968 – The molave wooden crosses marking the Stations of the Cross were blessed and installed by Fr José Martínez, a Franciscan from the church of Santa Ana, Manila. These were made from the beams of the old church.
- September 1968 – Arrival of 16 stained glass windows, depicting the fourteen Stations of the Cross, Our Lady of the Rosary and the Dominican saints Thomas Aquinas, Albert the Great and Vincent Ferrer. Six smaller windows, depicting the Four Evangelists and preaching, were later mounted in the apse. These depict, from left to right: Saints Matthew and Luke; an allegory of the Sermon on the Mount; Saint Paul Preaching to the Gentiles; and finally Saints Mark and John. They were designed by Cenon Rivera, former Dean of Fine Arts at the University of Santo Tomas and made by Kraut Art and Co.
- May 8, 1973 – Construction began on the church's ceiling, finishing by December 12; the architect was Adolfo Benavides. At about the same time, the narra ceiling of the Chapel of the Resurrection was mounted.
- April 6, 1974 – The painting of the church's exedra, which had begun February 6, 1974, was completed. The initial plan was to decorate the exedra with a mosaic of the Resurrection, but the idea was abandoned due to the high cost and other considerations. A painting with the same theme was later executed by Ireneo Robles, a young artist from the University of Santo Tomas.
- November 1978 – Work on the façade was finished, having begun on October 10, 1977. Architect Lorenzo del Castillo's concept was accepted out of many proposals. The old façade was retained, and a twin of the existing tower was built at the right side. Both towers were linked by two arches, surmounted by a shrine containing a cross. Stones from the old convento were used in the new parts of the façade.
- 1979 – Two bells, one weighing 267 kilograms (589 lb) and the other 207 kilograms (456 lb), arrived from Quintana's Factory in Saldaña, Palencia, Spain. Following tradition, one is named after the Santo Cristo and the other after Our Lady of the Rosary.
- November 1990 – concrete statues of eight Dominican saints—Louis Bertrand, Antoninus of Florence, Albertus Magnus, Catherine of Siena, Saint Dominic, Thomas Aquinas, Rose of Lima (a patron saint of the Philippines) and Vincent Ferrer—were installed in the niches of the façade.

== Historical recognition ==
- The church was recognized as a Historic Structure by the National Historical Commission of the Philippines (NHCP), with a cast-iron plaque that was issued and placed in 1937.
- The two century-old acacia trees beside the church were declared as heritage trees by DENR NCR last April 24, 2016.

== Gallery ==
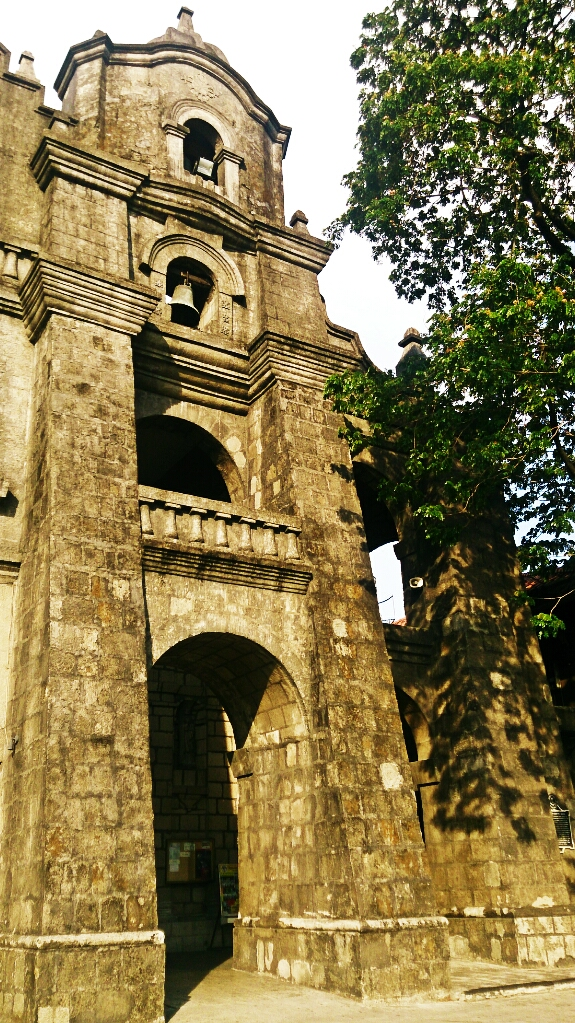
Southern belfry of the façade

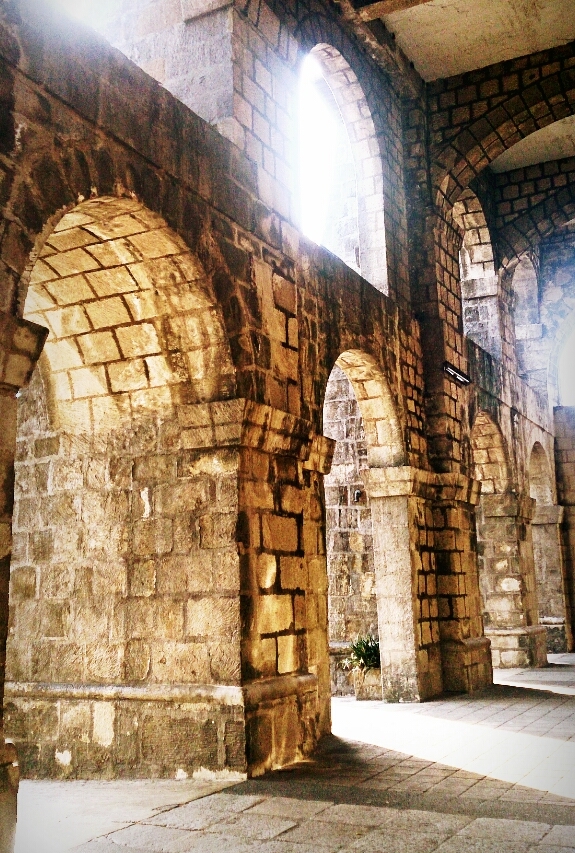
External narthex of the shrine

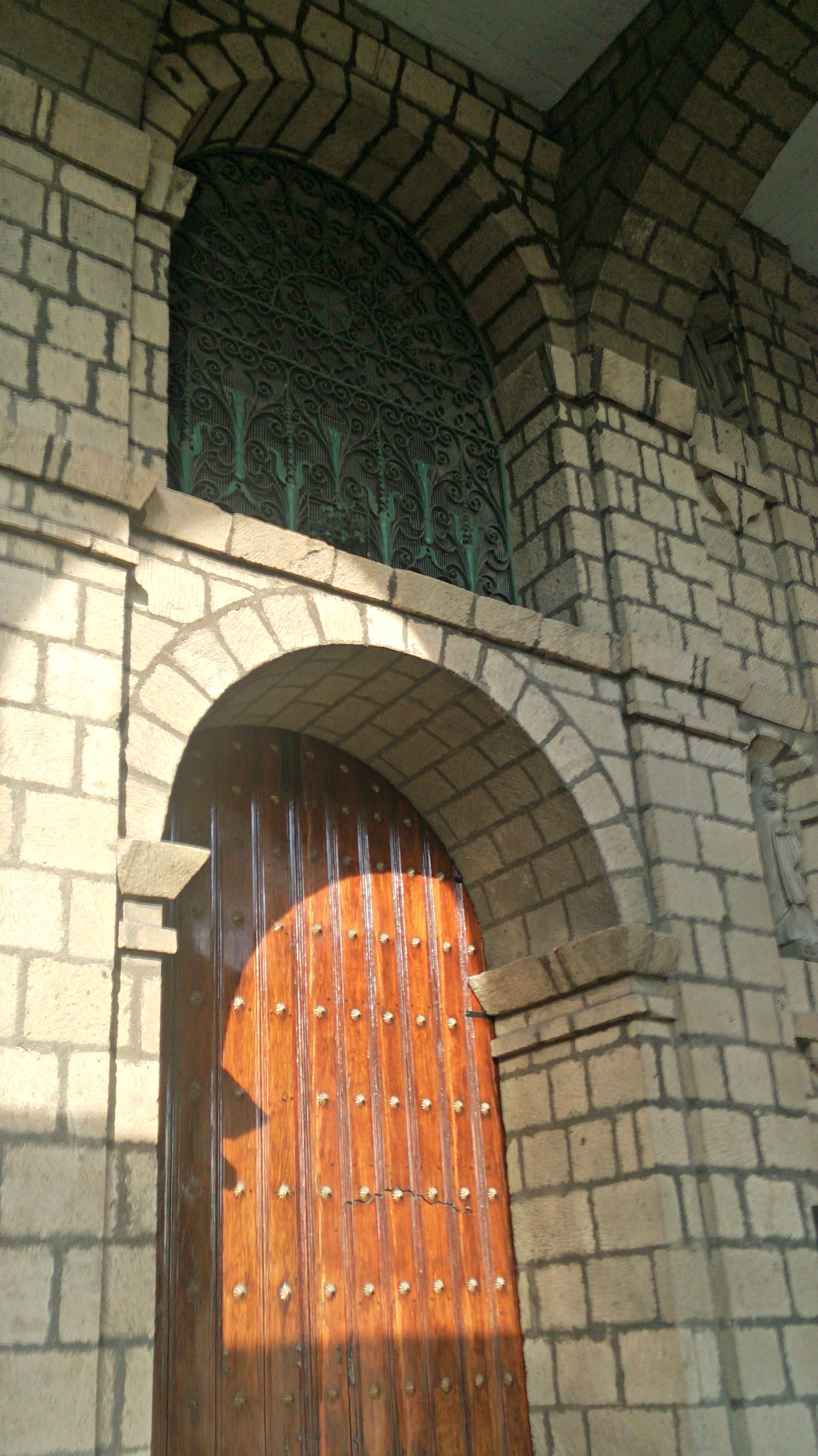
A door of the shrine

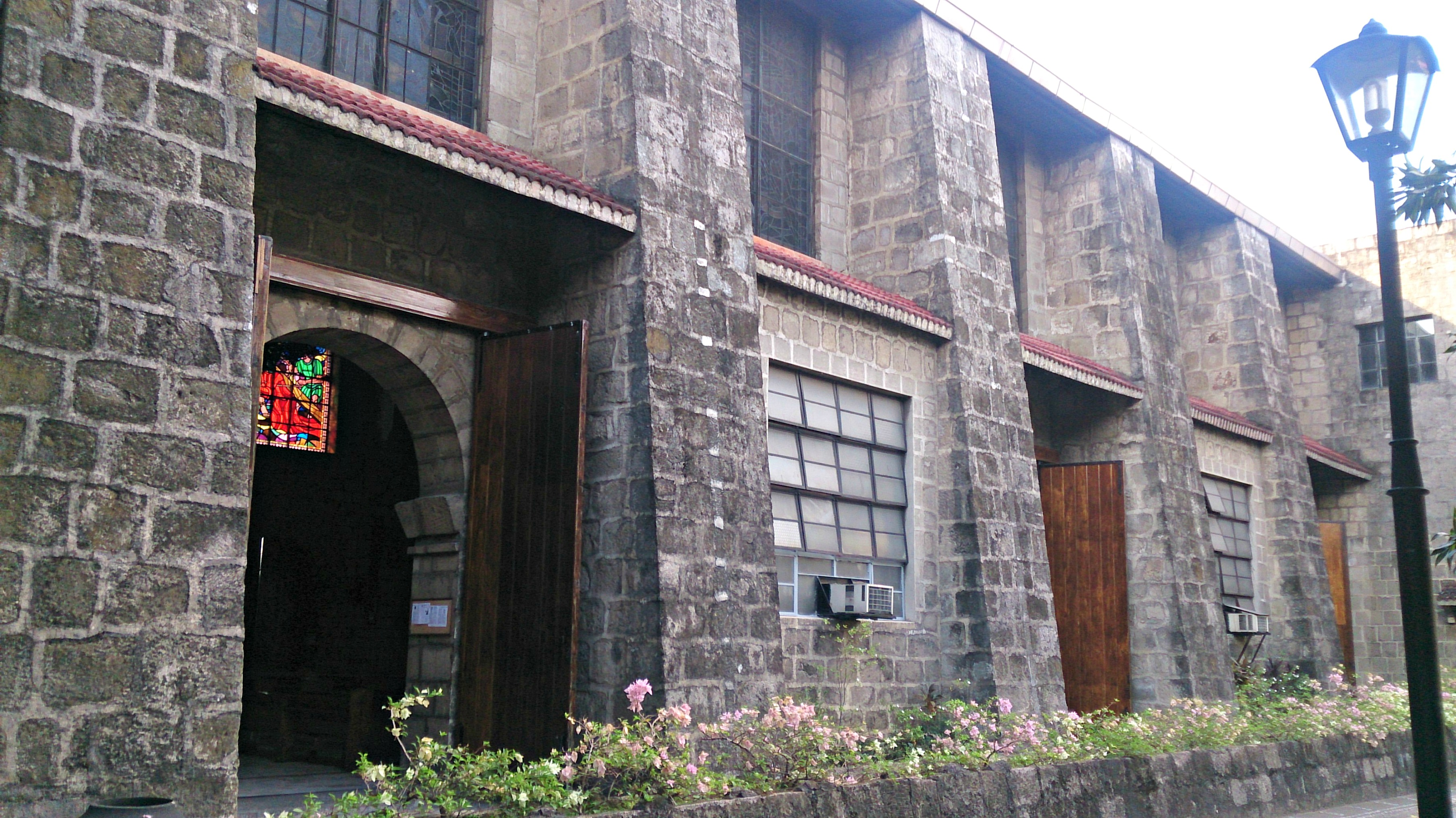
Side entrances along the southeastern flank beside the garden

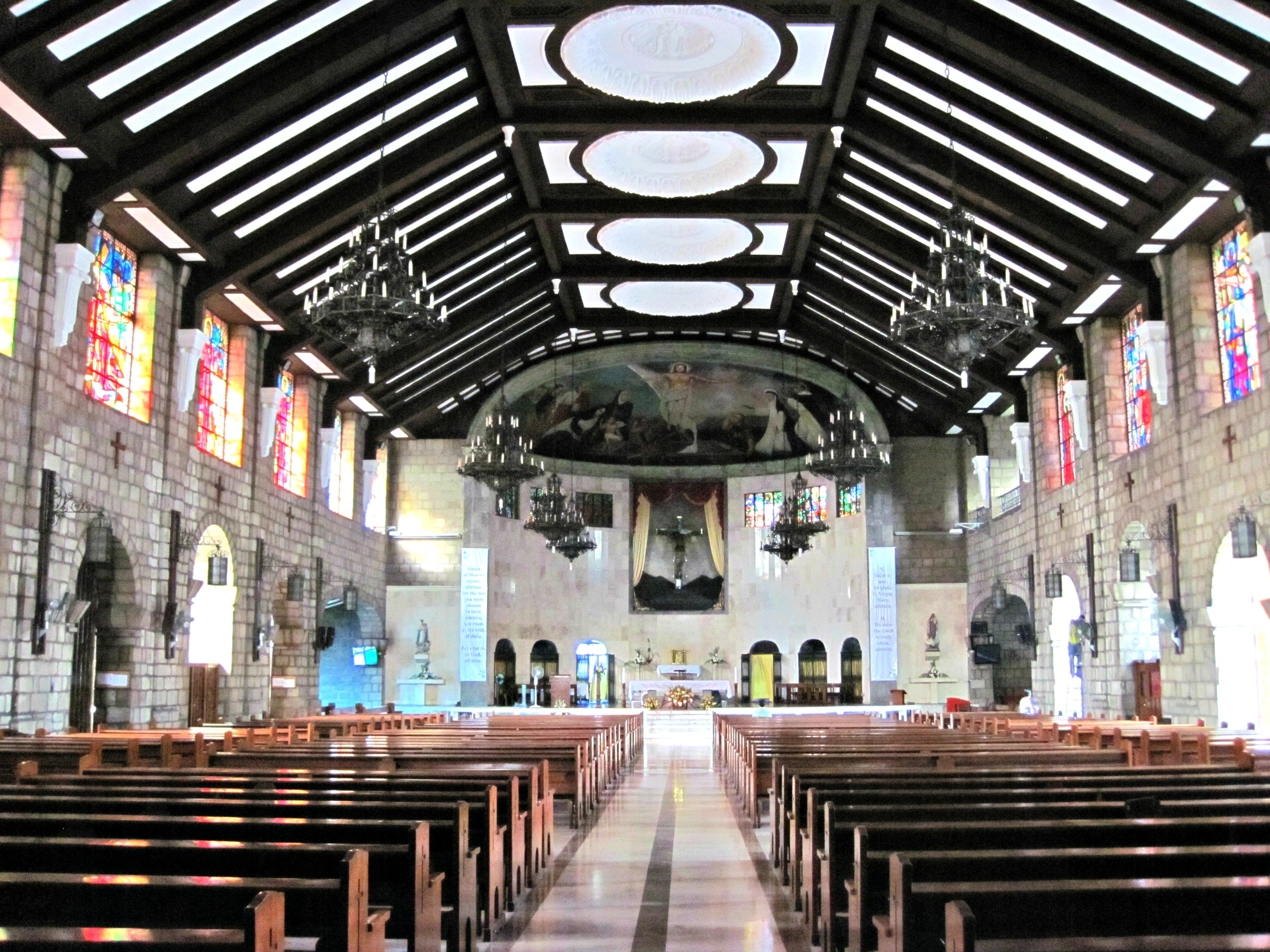
Nave and sanctuary in 2014

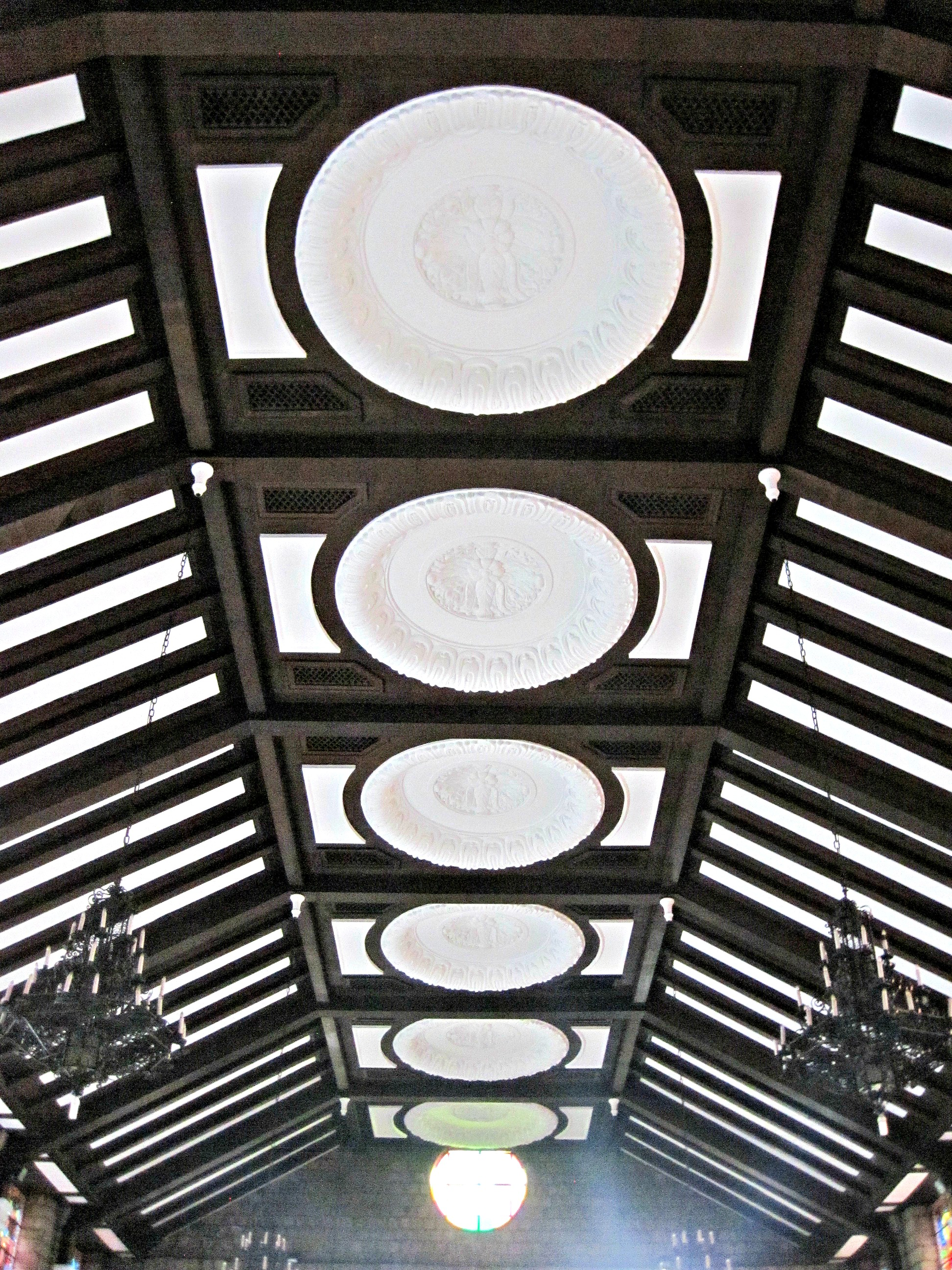
Detail of the ceiling bosses above the nave

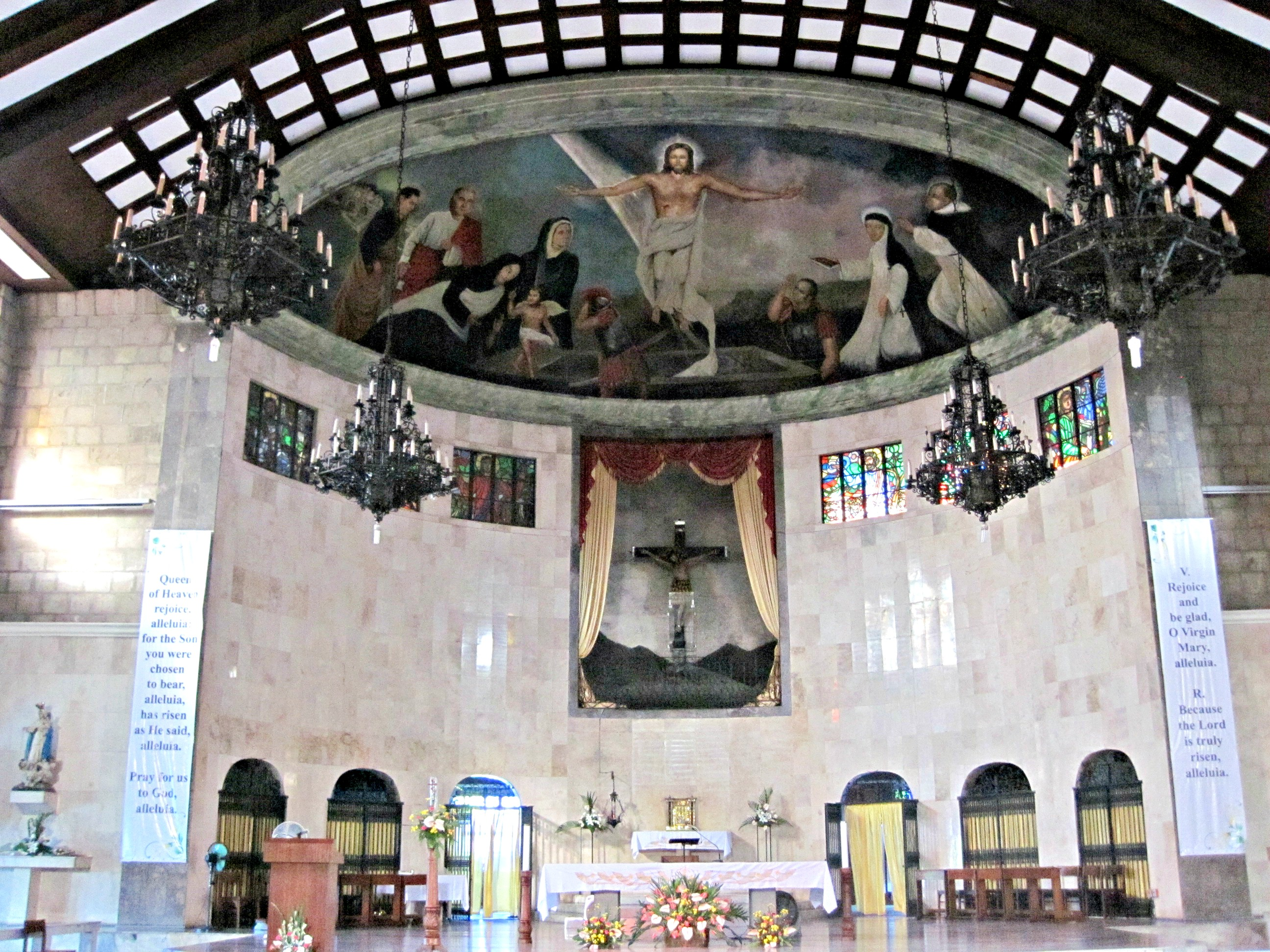
Sanctuary and exedra with fresco of the Resurrection by Robles

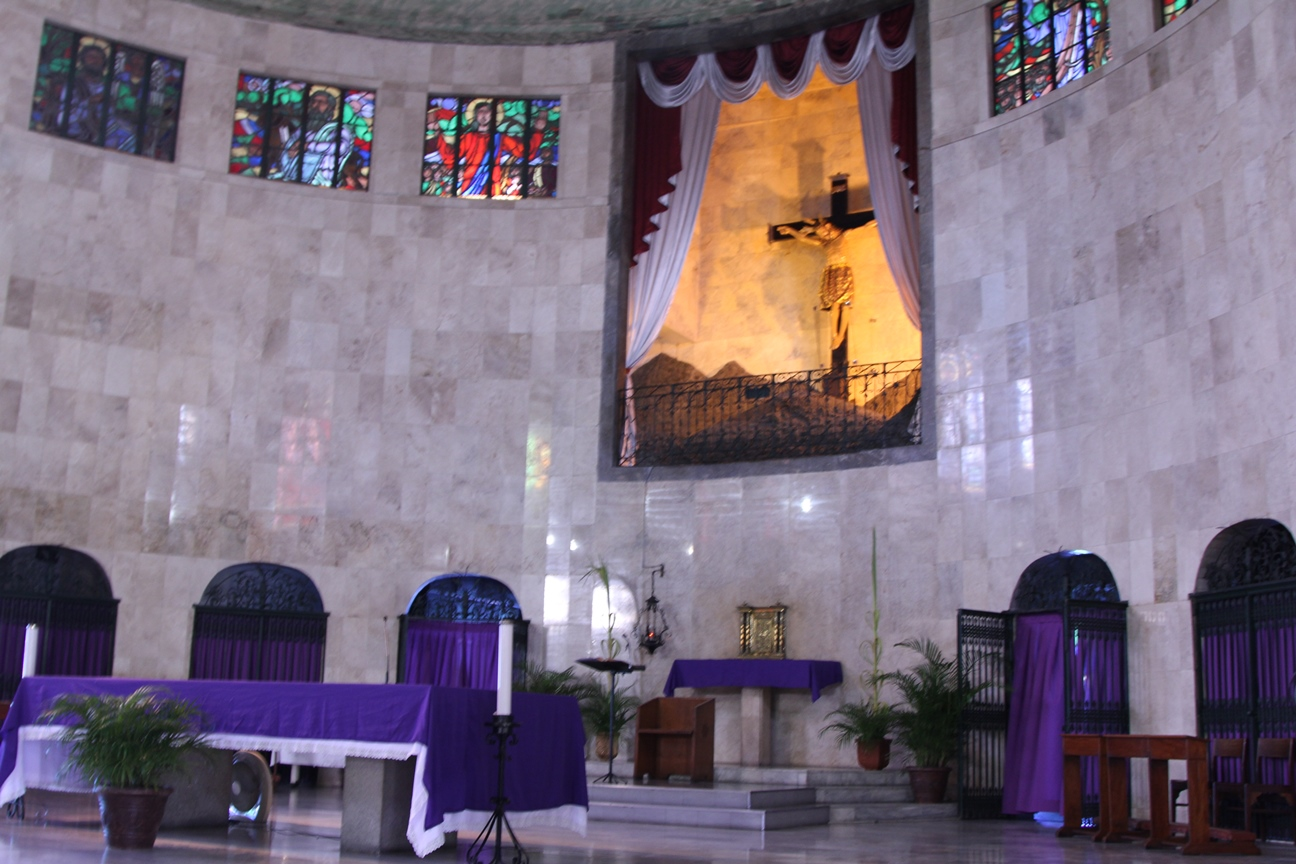
Main altar, with the Calvario above it
