= Agoncillo–Mariño House =

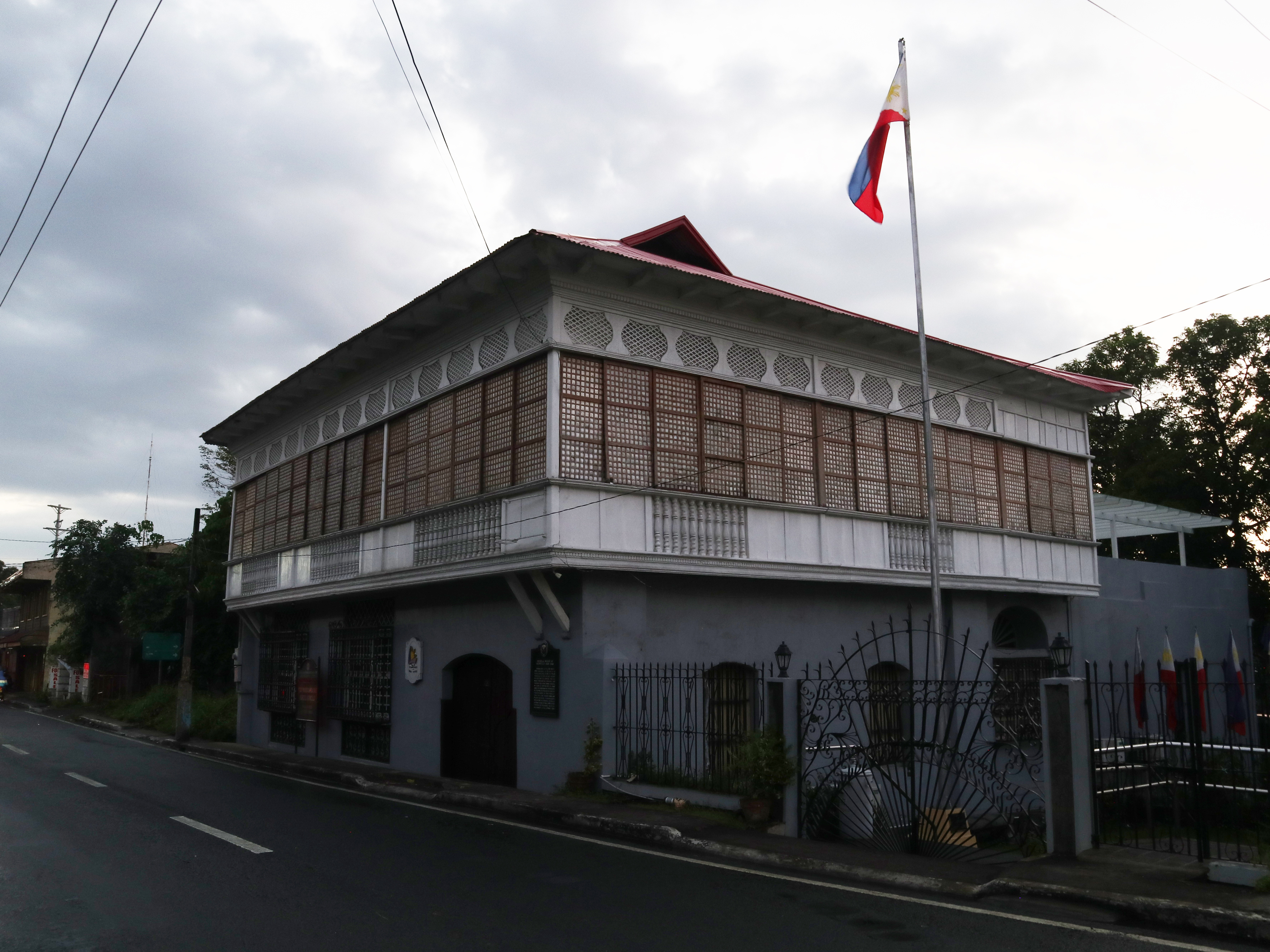
- The Agoncillo–Mariño House
- Interactive map of the Agoncillo–Mariño House area

General information
- Type: Museum
- Architectural style: Bahay na Bato
- Location: Marcela M. Agoncillo Street, Taal, Batangas, Taal, Philippines
- Coordinates: 13.878483°N 120.918099°E
- Owner: National Historical Commission of the Philippines

Technical details
- Material: Adobe and Wood

The Agoncillo–Mariño House is an old Spanish Colonial Era house in Taal, Batangas, Philippines. The house is one of the national shrines under the administration of the National Historical Commission of the Philippines (NHCP) with the purpose of memorializing the contribution of Marcela Mariño de Agoncillo in making the national flag of the Philippines and the deeds and ideals of Felipe Agoncillo y Encarnación, her husband, who came to be known as the "First Filipino Diplomat".

This house was built by Marcela Agoncillo's grandfather, Don Andrés Mariño, around the 1780s, thus, making this house one of the oldest houses in Taal. The ancestral house was then passed on from generation to generation until it was inherited by Marcela Mariño at the death of her grandfather. Felipe Agoncillo also lived in this house upon his marriage to Marcela in 1889.

On July 6, 1980, the living daughters of Marcela Agoncillo, Gregoria and Marcela, donated the Mariño ancestral house along with various furniture and family memorabilia to the government. It was then converted into a public museum and was named Museo nina Marcela Mariño and Felipe Agoncillo.

== See also ==
- Taal, Batangas
