= Felipe Agoncillo =

Filipino lawyer and politician (1859–1941)

Don Felipe Agoncillo
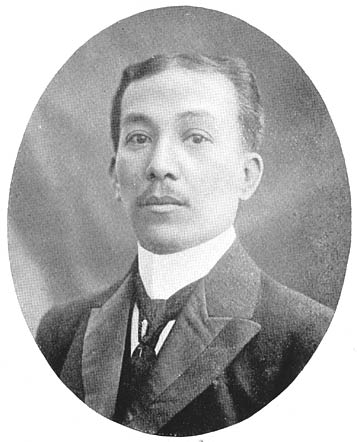
- A portrait of Don Felipe Agoncillo

Secretary of the Interior
- In office 1923–1925
- Appointed by: Leonard Wood
- Preceded by: Jose P. Laurel
- Succeeded by: Honorio Ventura

Member of the Philippine Assembly from Batangas's 1st district
- In office 1907–1909
- Preceded by: Post established
- Succeeded by: Galicano Apacible

Personal details
- Born: Felipe Agoncillo y Encarnación; May 26, 1859 Taal, Batangas, Captaincy General of the Philippines
- Died: September 29, 1941 (aged 82) Manila, Philippine Commonwealth
- Resting place: Santuario del Santo Cristo, San Juan, Metro Manila
- Spouse: Marcela Mariño
- Children: 6
- Education: Ateneo de Manila
- Profession: Lawyer; Diplomat
- Known for: His legacy as the first Filipino diplomat.
- Nickname(s): Don Felipe, Lolo Pipoy

Felipe Agoncillo y Encarnación (May 26, 1859 – September 29, 1941) was a Filipino lawyer and representative to the negotiations in Paris that led to the Treaty of Paris (1898), ending the Spanish–American War and achieving him the title of "Outstanding First Filipino Diplomat."

As a family friend and adviser of General Emilio Aguinaldo and General Antonio Luna during the critical times of the revolution, Agoncillo has been active in participating during that era especially when he presided over the Hong Kong Junta—a group of Filipino exiles who met to plan for future steps in achieving independence. His greatest contribution to Philippine history was when he was assigned to negotiate with foreign countries to secure the independence of the country. This was considered the most important assignment given by a General.

== Early life ==
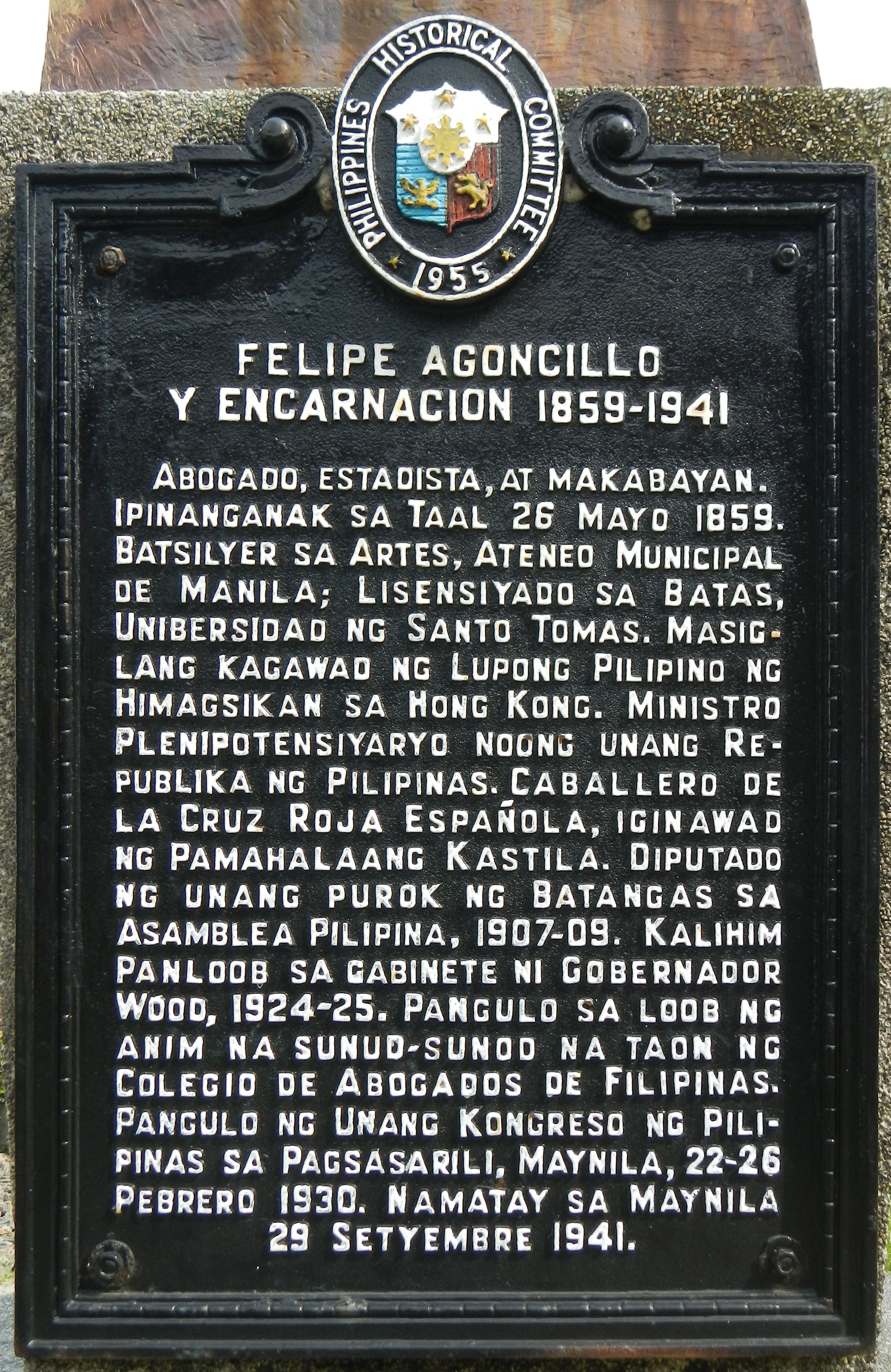
Historical marker installed in 1955 at the ancestral house of Agoncillo in Taal, Batangas

Agoncillo was born on May 26, 1859, in Taal, Batangas, to Ramón Agoncillo and Gregoria Encarnación.

Already noticed for his keen intelligence at an early age, Agoncillo later enrolled at the Ateneo Municipal de Manila where he was an honor student who earned high marks. Subsequently, he transferred to the Universidad de Santo Tomás where he graduated with a Bachelor of Laws in 1879 summa cum laude. After his parents' deaths, he returned to Taal in order to manage his family's properties.

Agoncillo graduated with a Master of Laws from Universidad de Santo Tomás and began his law practice in Manila.

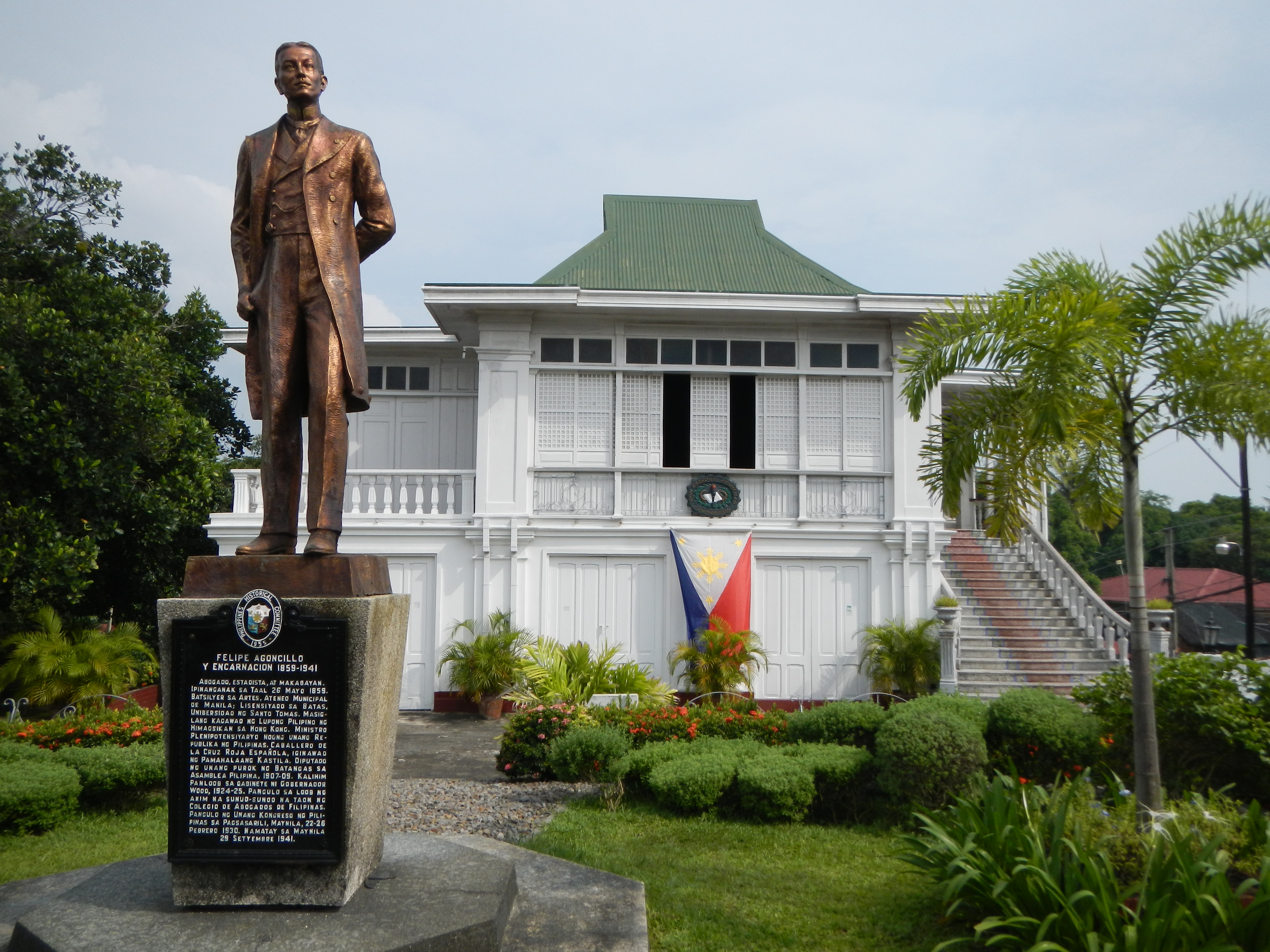
Felipe Agoncillo Ancestral House (Taal, Batangas).

== Exile to Hong Kong ==
Forewarned by the plans of the governor-general, he sailed directly to Yokohama, Japan but briefly stayed and went to Hong Kong where he joined other Filipino exiles who found asylum when the revolution broke out in 1896. They temporarily sojourned at Morrison Hill Road in Wanchai and later became a refuge for exiled Filipino patriots.

After the signing of the Pact of Biak-na-Bato, Gen. Aguinaldo joined them. They initiated meetings in the Agoncillo residence on the months of April and March 1898, Gen. Luna was one in the attendance.

On August 30, 1898, he met Francis Vinton Greene, an officer who participated in the Cuban theatre of the Spanish-American War. Greene was ordered by US President McKinley to board a steamship from Hong Kong to Manila, and saw Agoncillo, who is hoping to see US President McKinley, on the same steamship and whom he invoke a good friendship with.

== Diplomacy ==
After the signing of the truce, Agoncillo spearheaded the Central Revolutionary Committee and organized the propaganda office for General Aguinaldo's revolutionary government.

The Philippine Revolutionary Government commissioned Agoncillo as Minister Plenipotentiary to negotiate treaties with foreign governments. Agoncillo and Jose "Sixto" Lopez were sent to Washington, D.C., United States to lobby foreign entities that Filipinos are well civilized people and capable of maintaining stable government and to secure recognition of Philippine independence.

Agoncillo met with President McKinley on October 1, 1899, and, speaking florid Castilian Spanish, described excesses under Spanish colonial rule. He described the American system as the model which the Philippine people will follow when they are independent, and asserted that U.S. emissaries had pledged support for Filipino self-rule. Ignoring the assertion of previous American commitments, McKinley rejected Agoncillo's request for Filipino representation at the peace talks between the U.S. and Spain and invited him to give the U.S. State Department a memorandum summarizing his views. After being ignored by the US president, Agoncillo proceeded to Paris, France to present the Philippine cause at the peace conference convened between Spain and the US, where a meeting was to be held to discuss Cuba and the Philippines. Agoncillo tried to submit a memorandum but again failed. The people behind the meeting did not want to have any official dealings with him. On December 10, 1898, the treaty was successfully signed.

Subsequently, Agoncillo's diplomatic activity incurred expenses that had exhausted his savings. Further, the cost traveling and negotiating abroad on behalf of The Philippines had forced him to sell his wife's jewelry.

=== Agoncillo's protest ===
Two days after the signing of the Treaty of Paris, Agoncillo returned to the United States and endeavored to block ratification of the treaty by the US. Although this was signed by the commissioners, it was not yet approved by the Senate of the United States. He filed a State memorandum to express that Filipinos must be recognized by the United States. He presented a formal protest which was called Memorial to the Senate to the president and delegates of the Spanish-American Commission saying:

If the Spaniards have not been able to transfer to the Americans the rights which they did not possess; if the latter have not militarily conquered positions in the Philippines; if the occupation of Manila was a resultant fact, prepared by the Filipinos; if the international officials and representatives of the Republic of the United States of America offered to recognize the independence and sovereignty of the Philippines, solicited and accepted their alliance, how can they now constitute themselves as arbiters of the control, administration and future government of the Philippine Islands?

If the Treaty of Paris there had simply been declared the withdrawal and abandonment by the Spaniards of their domination --if they had such --over Filipino territory, if America, on accepting peace, had signed the Treaty, without prejudice to the rights of the Philippines, and with a view to coming to a subsequent settlement with the existing Filipino National Government, thus recognizing the sovereignty of the latter, their alliance and the carrying out of their promises of honor to the said Filipinos, no protest against their action would have been made. But in view of the terms of the Article III of the Protocol, the attitude of the American Commissioners, and the imperative necessity of safeguarding the national rights of my country, I take this protest, for the before-mentioned reasons but with the proper legal reservations, against the action taken and the resolutions passed by the Peace Commissioners at Paris and in the Treaty signed by them.

Agoncillo's conclusion about the treaty was that it was not binding on the Philippine government. In the memorandum, he clearly stated the reasons why Spain had no right to transfer the Philippines to the United States and that when the treaty was signed, Spain no longer held the Filipinos.

At that time, many Americans were also against the treaty, so they established the Anti-Imperialist League which opposed making the Philippines a colony of the United States. Afterwards, on February 4, 1899, the Philippine–American War began; this turned on approval of the treaty of Paris.

=== Post Philippine–American War ===
On August 29, 1900, he met with Gustave Moynier, an original member of the Committee of Five and ICRC President. Agoncillo sought recognition of the Filipino Red Cross Society as well as the application of the First Geneva Convention during the Philippine–American War.

== Return to Manila ==
When hostilities ended between Filipinos and Americans, he returned to Hong Kong and rejoined the exiled junta. Later, on July 15, 1901, after American rule was firmly established in Manila, he went back to the Philippines as a poor man and lived in his house in Malate, Manila together with his family.

=== Continuing service ===
While in Manila, he resumed his law practice and other business. He took the bar exam in 1905 and passed with a perfect score of 100 percent, an achievement which has remained unmatched until today. His examination papers have been preserved in the Filipiniana section of the Philippine Library and Museum.

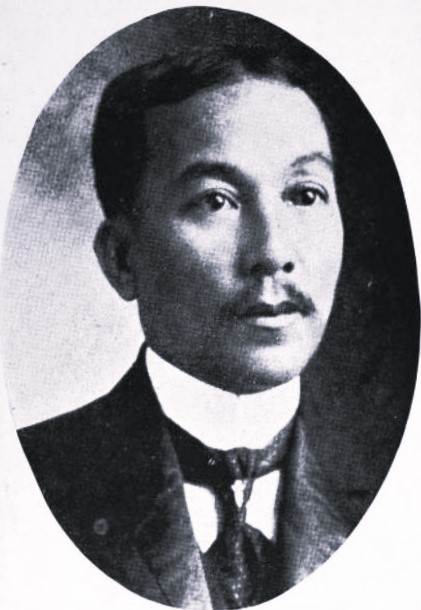
Agoncillo as a member of the Philippine Assembly, 1908

In 1907, Agoncillo was elected Deputy to the First Philippine Assembly, representing the first district of Batangas. He was once a defense of El Renacimiento, whose editors were charged with libel by Dean C. Worcester. De Agoncillo was appointed as Secretary of Interior in 1923 during the administration of Governor General Leonard Wood and fought for the Filipinazation of the government service.

== Personal life ==
By age 30, Agoncillo was already a local judge and was married to Marcela Mariño, a daughter of another established family in Taal. Together, they had six daughters: Lorenza (Enchang), Gregoria (Goring), Eugenia (Nene), Marcela (Celing), Adela, who died at the age of three, and Maria (Maring), who died on July 6, 1995.

== Charity ==
While in Taal, Agoncillo continued his legal services and gave charity to poor and oppressed Filipinos. He was so generous that he posted an inscription outside his office: "Free legal services to the poor anytime."

Having heard by the parish priest of his activities and for preaching patriotic ideas, he was accused as anti patriotic, anti religious and was described as filibustero or subversive. He was later recommended to the governor-general for deportation.

== Death and legacy ==
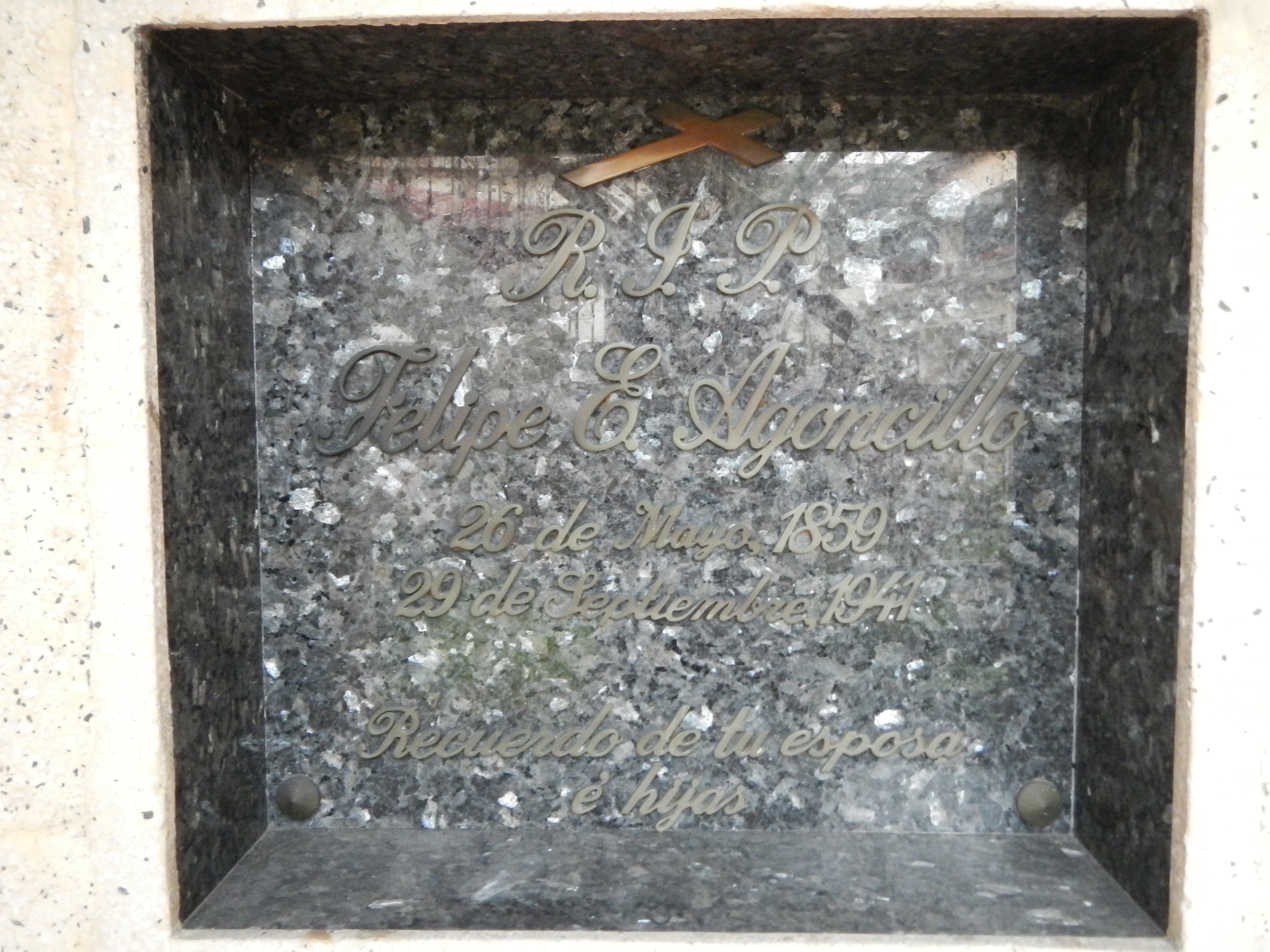
Grave of Agoncillo in a cemetery adjoining Santuario del Santo Cristo, San Juan, Metro Manila

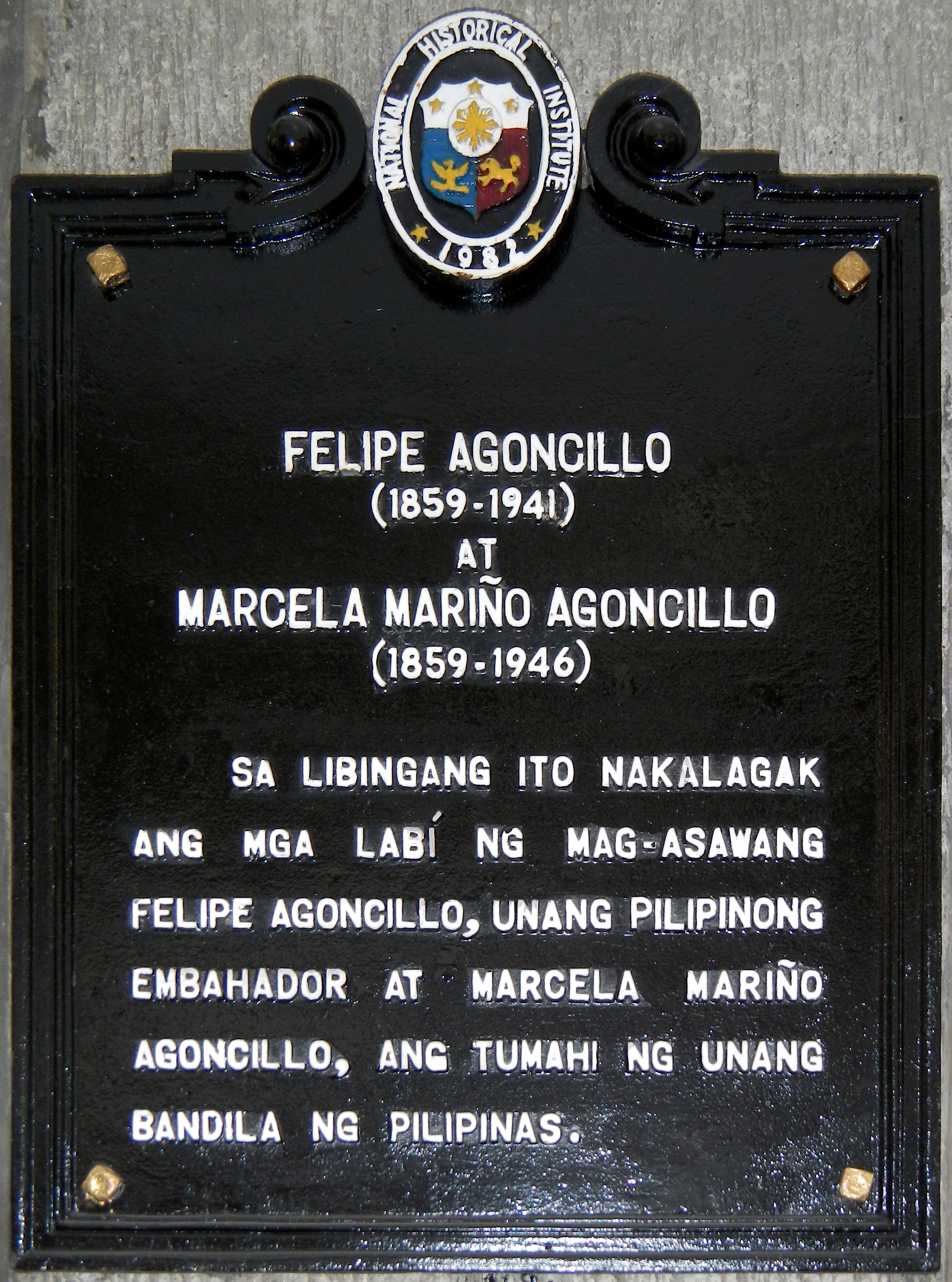
Historical marker in the cemetery

Agoncillo died on September 29, 1941, at Manila Doctors Hospital, Manila due to pneumonia. His remains were initially buried at La Loma Cemetery but was later transferred to Santuario del Santo Cristo in San Juan.

=== Legacy ===
The Felipe Agoncillo Ancestral House is located at Taal, Batangas. The municipality of Agoncillo in Batangas is named after him.

=== Portrayals ===
- Portrayed by Alvin Anson in the 2012 film, El Presidente.

== Quotes ==
The following quotes have been attributed to Agoncillo:

- Kailangan ang katapatan upang magkaunawaan. (Truth is needed to attain understanding.)
- Kailangan ng mga sawimpalad ang pagkalinga ng mga higit na mapalad. (The less fortunate need care from the more fortunate.)
- Kayamanan, oras, at kahit na buhay ay maiaalay ng taong nagmamahal sa bayan. (A person who loves his or her country can offer to it wealth, time or even life itself).

== See also ==
- Taal, Batangas
- Agoncillo-Mariño House
- Philippine–American War
- Treaty of Paris (1898)
