= Our Lady of Caysasay Academy =

Catholic educational institution in the Philippines

- Motto: Veritas et Amor
- Motto in English: Truth and Love
- Type: Catholic
- Established: 1945
- Location: Taal, Batangas, Philippines
- Hymn: OLCA Hymn
- Colors: Green and White

Our Lady of Caysasay Academy (OLCA) is a Roman Catholic educational institution located in Taal, Batangas, Philippines.

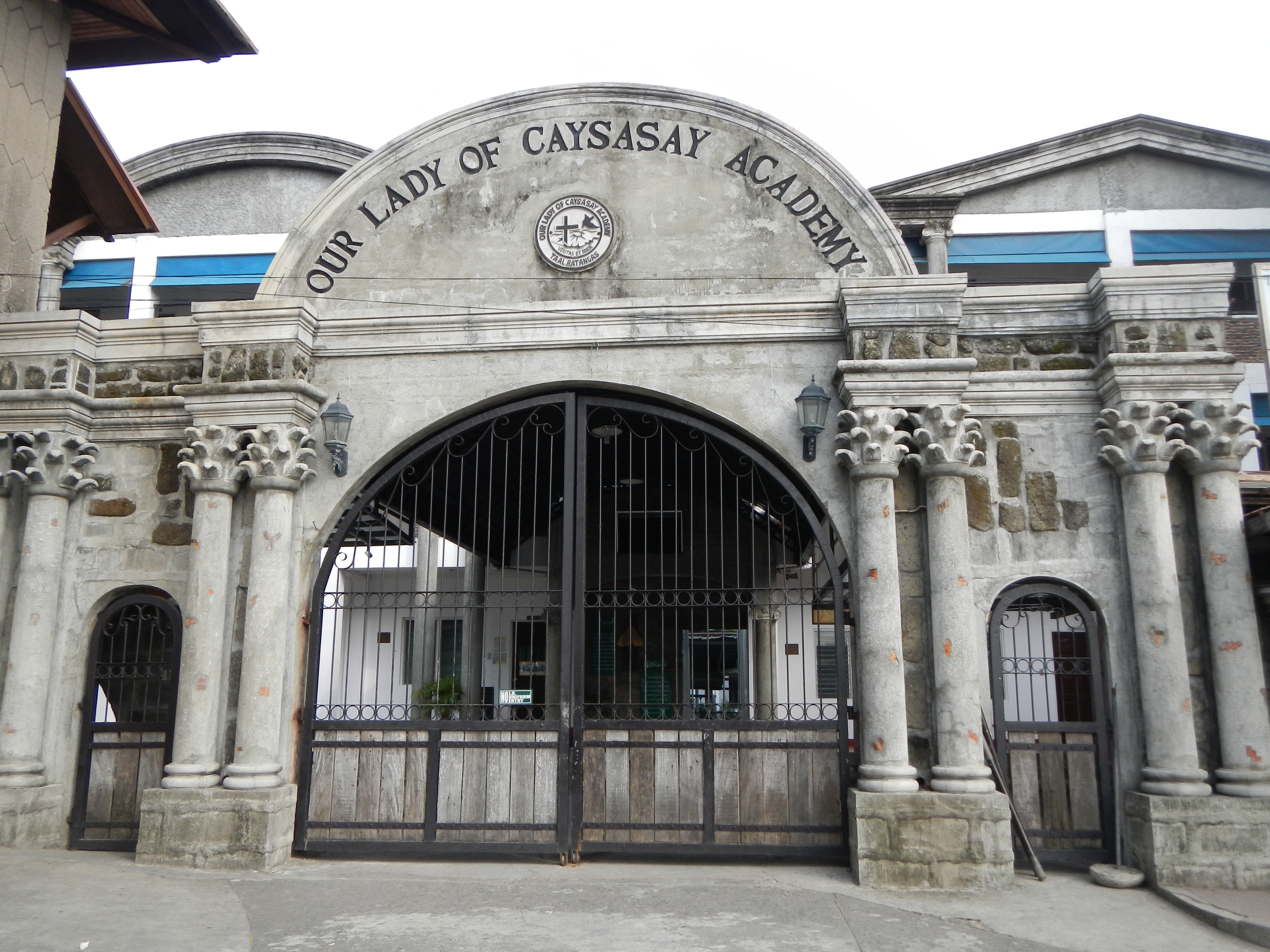
Our Lady of Caysasay Academy facade.

== History ==
Sisters from the Benedictine Missionary Congregation came to Taal as war evacuees in 1945 and lived in a borrowed house. The Sisters taught piano, mathematics and other subjects and ran a kindergarten school. After the war, they were asked to return at the invitation of Alfredo Verzosa, then Bishop of Lipa, to run a school. After much consultation, the Mother Prioress and her councilors decided to accept the offer. Sister Superior Agnella Mayer was asked to found the school with the help of Sister Caridad Barrion and Sister Liboria Kampinan. The school was first named St. Martin's Academy.

Bishop Versoza, who was then staying at St. Bridget's College, wanted the school to be named in honor of the Virgin Mary. Thus, the school was renamed to Our Lady of Caysasay Academy. The Sisters of St. Bridget's College provided the Benedictine Sisters and the text books. Mariano Lasala was the parish priest of Taal at the time.

After several years, a high school building was erected under the administration of Sister Hyginia Peralta. This was later converted into the grade school building when a twelve-room high school building was constructed. A convent was also built for the Sisters. Several annex buildings were also built.

In 1970, OLCA had its first two lay principals: Mercedes Anorico led the grade school and Tita M. Alcazar led the high school.

The grade school department was originally co-educational while the high school was exclusive to girls. Starting in 1983, boys were accepted in the high school department.

On April 27, 1993, the Benedictine Sisters through Sister Pia Lansang turned over the school to the Archdiocese of Lipa in the presence of Salvador Q. Quizon, who represented Archbishop Mariano Gaviola.

The Community of the Missionary Catechists of the Sacred Heart (MCSH) was invited to assist in the school administration and religious formation in 1996. Sister Mary Regina Conti was appointed Assistant Directress.

== Current status ==
In 2023, the Academy offers education at Nursey, Lower Basic, Junior High and Senior High School level. The Senior High School offers courses in the areas of Business, Humanities, Social Sciences and STEM.
