= Taal, Batangas =

Municipality in Batangas, Philippines

Taal
- Municipality
- Municipality of Taal
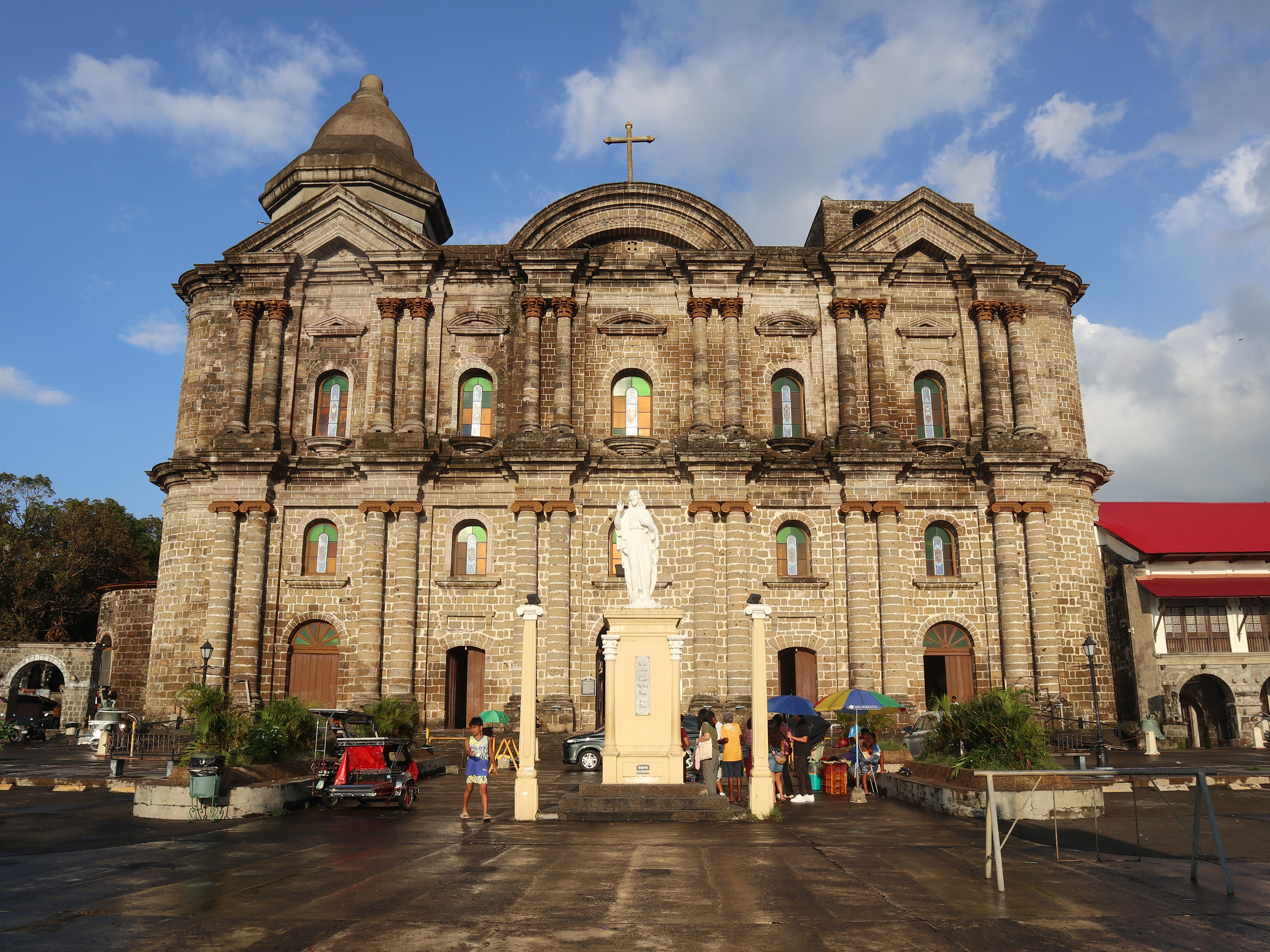
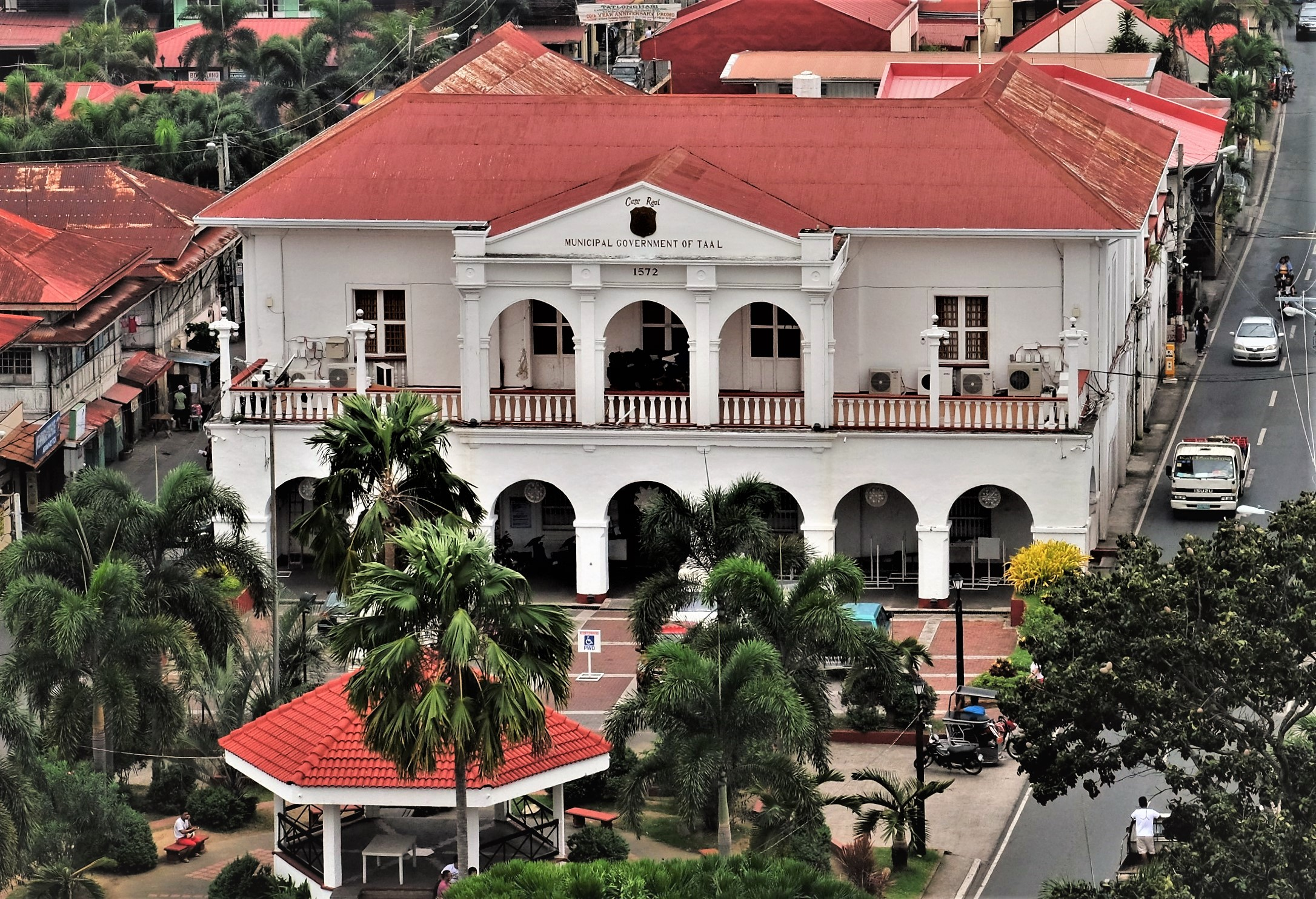
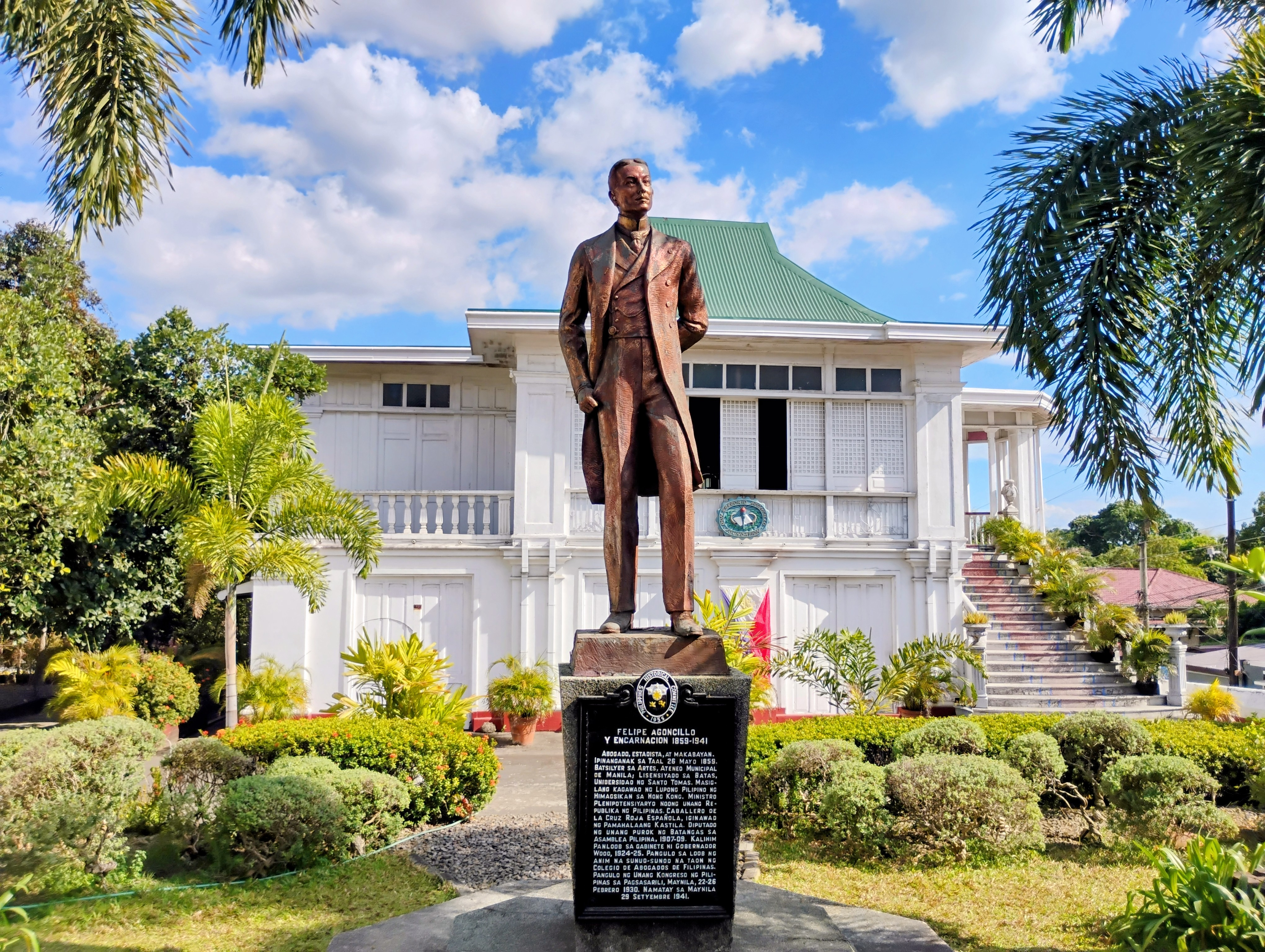
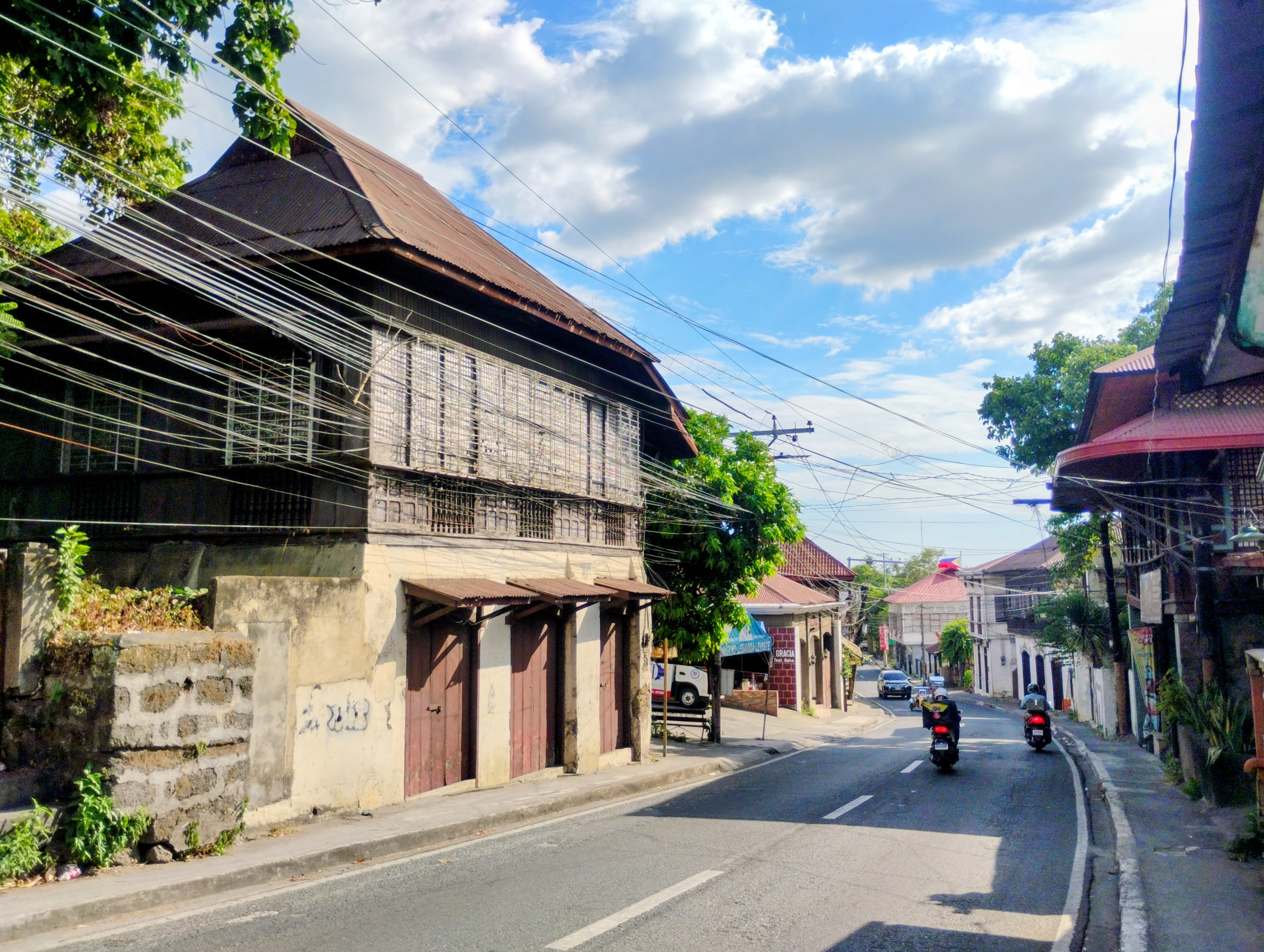
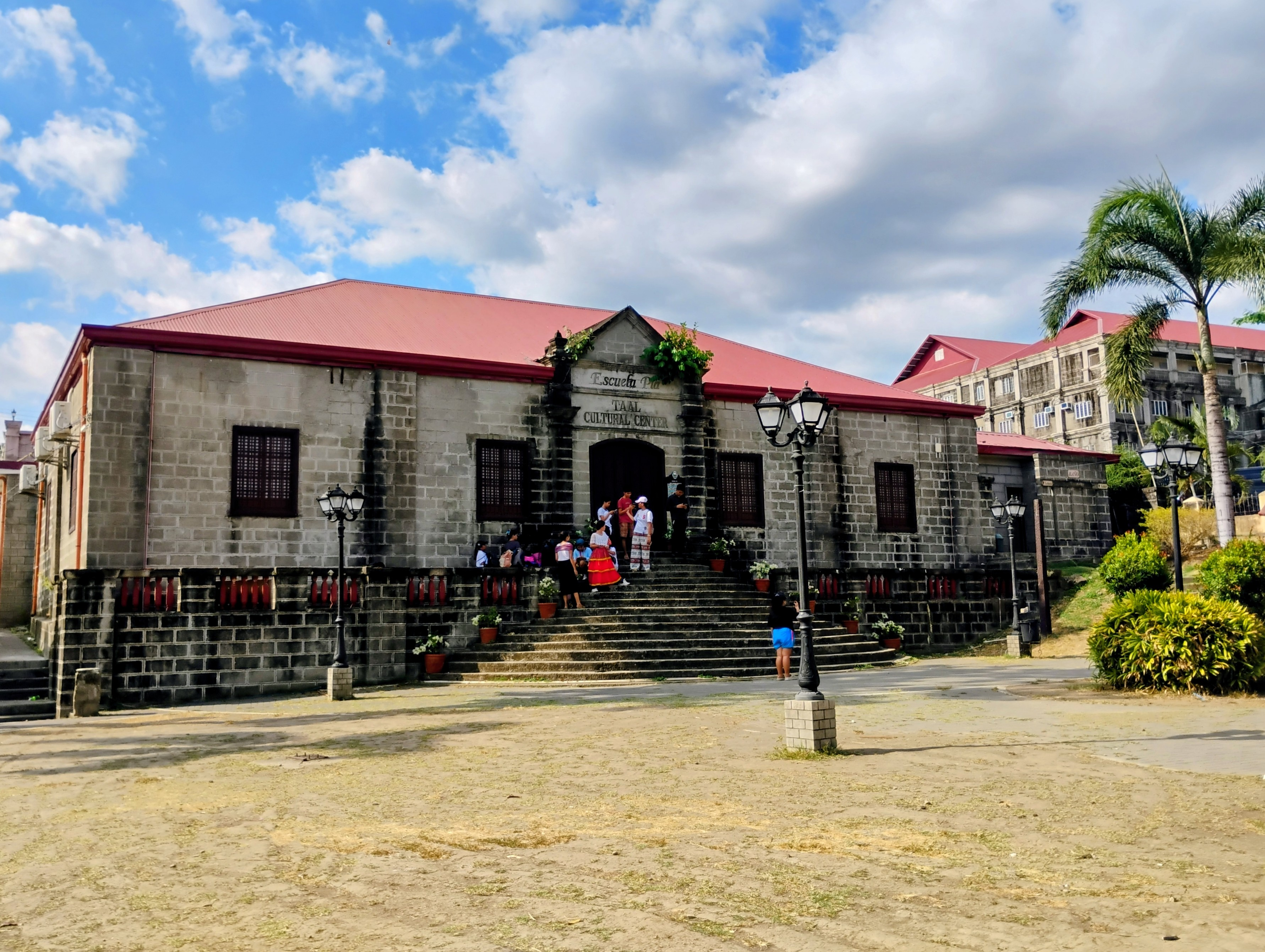
- Taal Basilica Taal Municipal Hall Gregorio Agoncillo Mansion Calle Marcela Mariño Agoncillo Escuela Pia

- Map of Batangas with Taal highlighted
- Interactive map of Taal
- Location within the Philippines
- Coordinates: 13°53′N 120°56′E
- Country: Philippines
- Region: Calabarzon
- Province: Batangas
- District: 1st district
- Founded: April 26, 1572
- Named for: Taal Volcano
- Barangays: 42 (see Barangays)

Government
  - Type: Sangguniang Bayan
  - Mayor: Naereeza Grace M. Bainto
  - Vice Mayor: Michael Rey A. Villano
  - Representative: Leandro Antonio L. Leviste
  - Municipal Council: Members: Arnulfo C. Garces; Regie S. Aceron; Andres Basilio A. Diokno; Thomas Gabriel C. Albufera; Rolando B. Correa Jr.; Edenly V. Navarro; Erwin M. Lascano; Randy V. Baleros
  - Electorate: 40,453 voters (2025)

Area
  - Total: 29.76 km^{2} (11.49 sq mi)
- Elevation: 63 m (207 ft)
- Highest elevation: 194 m (636 ft)
- Lowest elevation: 0 m (0 ft)

Population (2024 census)
  - Total: 61,559
  - Density: 2,069/km^{2} (5,357/sq mi)
  - Households: 14,977

Economy
  - Income class: 1st municipal income class
  - Poverty incidence: 6.85% (2023)
  - Revenue: ₱ 26.48 million (2024)
  - Assets: ₱ 557.4 million (2024)
  - Expenditure: ₱ 129.6 million (2024)
  - Liabilities: ₱ 85.13 million (2024)

Service provider
  - Electricity: Batangas 1 Electric Cooperative (BATELEC 1)
- Time zone: UTC+8 (PST)
- ZIP code: 4208
- PSGC: 0401029000
- IDD : area code: +63 (0)43
- Native languages: Tagalog

Taal [ta'ʔal], officially the Municipality of Taal (Tagalog: Bayan ng Taal), is a municipality in the province of Batangas, Philippines. According to the 2024 census, it had a population of 61,559.

It is famous for its old ancestral houses, one particular ancestral house (now a museum) where Marcela Coronel Mariño de Agoncillo grew up in Taal, Batangas built in the 1770s by her grandparents, Don Andres Sauza Mariño and Doña Eugenia Diokno Mariño. The poblacion (town proper) is designated as a National Historical Landmark. It is also known as the balisong and barong tagalog capital of the Philippines. The town is home to hundreds of heritage structures dating from the Spanish colonial period. Scholars have been pushing for its inclusion in the UNESCO World Heritage List.

== Etymology ==
The name "Taal" may have come from:

- The archaic Tagalog word taal, possibly meaning pure or unadulterated;
- The Tagalog word taad, which refers to sugarcane cutting used in planting;
- A wild palm tree called tal-an or taal-an or possibly after the tala palm (Borassus flabellifer), hence the name tala-an meaning “the place where the “tala grows”; and
- The ipil tree (Intsia bijuga), which is also known as taal in some areas of the Philippines.

== History ==
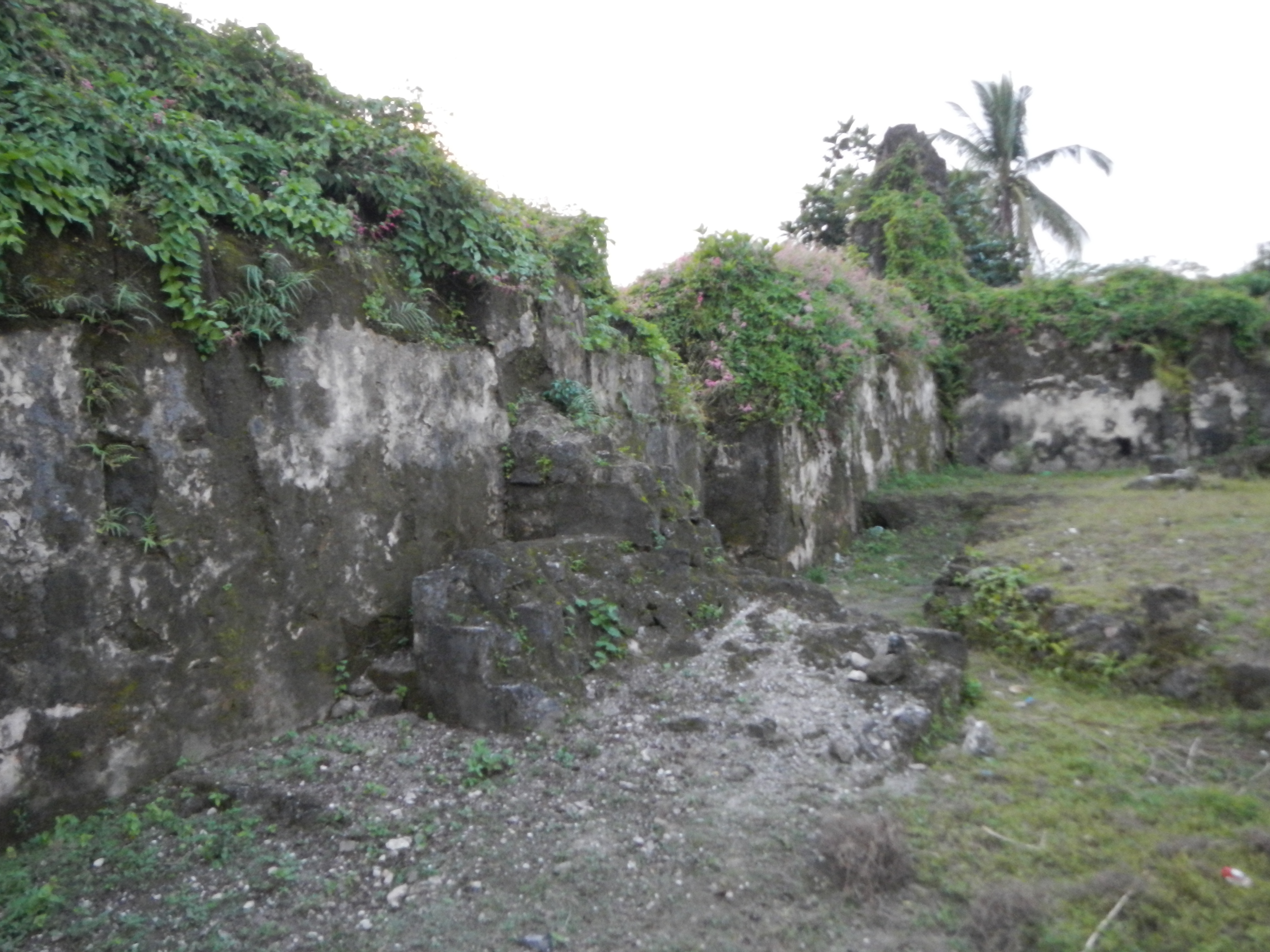
Ruins of the old site of Taal Basilica in San Nicolas.

The town of Taal was founded by Augustinian friars in 1572. In 1575, the town transferred later to the edge of Domingo Lake (now Taal Lake) in 1575. In 1732, it became the provincial capital of Batangas. In 1754, Taal Volcano erupted, endangering the town of Taal which stood at present-day San Nicolas. Threatened by the new danger, the townspeople, together with the Augustinian Francisco Benchucillo, sought refuge in the sanctuary of Caysasay. The provincial capital was also transferred to the then-town of Batangas in the same year.

=== Territorial changes ===
Taal used to encompass a much more extensive area. In 1596, the former barrio of Bauan was established as a parish, effectively separating it from Taal.

Following the 1754 Taal Volcano eruption, the northern shoreline of Taal Lake that was previously part of Tanauan was annexed to Taal, as Tanauan transferred from the lake's northwestern Tanauan Bay to Sala, its present-day barangay. It later became part of Talisay upon its establishment in 1869.

In 1861, the southern parts of Taal were separated to form the new municipality of San Luis. A year later, the northern and western parts of Taal were also separated to form the municipality of Lemery, which also consists the present-day Agoncillo.

In 1903, San Luis and Lemery were returned to Taal; San Luis's poblacion was reverted to its old name Balibago. In 1904, the western Tanauan barrios of Balaquilong (Balakilong), Bayuyungan, Binirayan (Berinayan), Bugaan, and San Gabriel were annexed to Taal by virtue of Act No. 1244; these barrios would eventually be returned to Talisay and become barangays of present-day Laurel. Lemery and San Luis were once again separated from Taal and reconstituted as independent municipalities in 1906 and in 1918, respectively.

In 1955, the northern barrios of San Nicolas, Gipit, Bangin, Pansipit, Calangay, Sinturisan, Talang, Abilo, Balete, Bancora, Saimsim, Maabud, Mulawin, Tambo, Calumala, Alasas, Calawit, and Pulangbato were separated from Taal to form the new municipality of San Nicolas. In 1961, the eastern barrios of Sambat, Sinipian, Bihis, Calayaan, Irukan and Cutang Cawayan were separated from Taal to form the new municipality of Santa Teresita.

== Geography ==
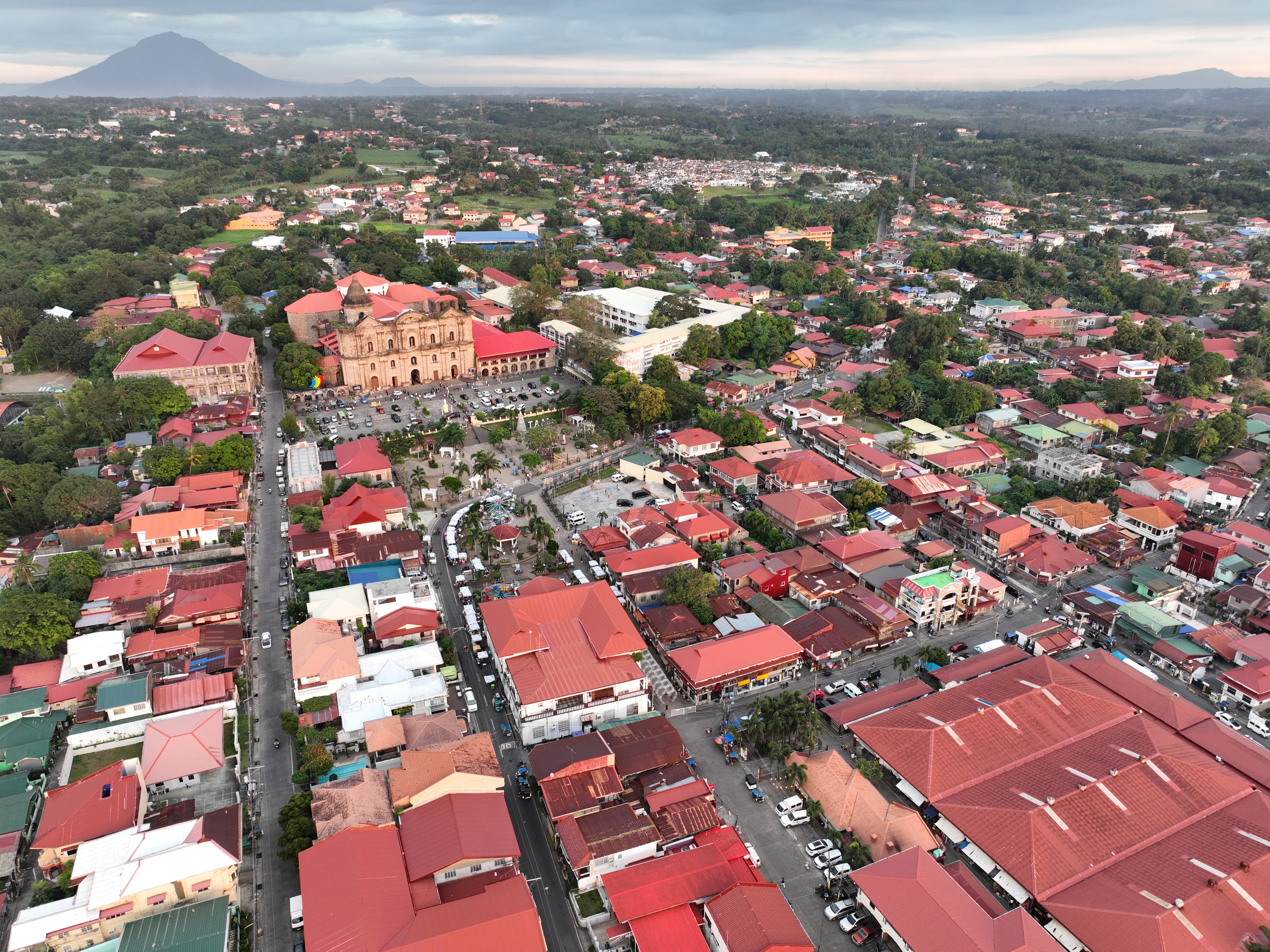
Drone shot of Taal

According to the Philippine Statistics Authority, the municipality has a land area of 29.76 square kilometers (11.49 sq mi) constituting 0.95% of the 3,119.75-square-kilometer (1,204.54 sq mi) total area of Batangas.

It covers an area of 270 square kilometers (100 sq mi) and is drained by Pansipit River down into Balayan Bay. Pansipit is one of the major ecological highways that allow migration of two fish species: maliputo (Caranx ignobilis), and muslo (Caranx marginalis) which are unique to Lake Taal. Adult fish migrate to the sea from Taal Lake via Pansipit River and Palanas River in Lemery. The tawilis (Harengula tawilis) is a freshwater sardine also endemic to Taal Lake.

=== Climate ===
Climate data for Taal, Batangas
| Month | Jan | Feb | Mar | Apr | May | Jun | Jul | Aug | Sep | Oct | Nov | Dec | Year |
|---|---|---|---|---|---|---|---|---|---|---|---|---|---|
| Mean daily maximum °C (°F) | 28 (82) | 30 (86) | 31 (88) | 33 (91) | 32 (90) | 30 (86) | 29 (84) | 29 (84) | 29 (84) | 29 (84) | 29 (84) | 28 (82) | 30 (85) |
| Mean daily minimum °C (°F) | 20 (68) | 20 (68) | 20 (68) | 22 (72) | 24 (75) | 24 (75) | 24 (75) | 24 (75) | 24 (75) | 23 (73) | 22 (72) | 21 (70) | 22 (72) |
| Average precipitation mm (inches) | 11 (0.4) | 13 (0.5) | 14 (0.6) | 32 (1.3) | 101 (4.0) | 142 (5.6) | 208 (8.2) | 187 (7.4) | 175 (6.9) | 131 (5.2) | 68 (2.7) | 39 (1.5) | 1,121 (44.3) |
| Average rainy days | 5.2 | 5.0 | 7.4 | 11.5 | 19.8 | 23.5 | 27.0 | 25.9 | 25.2 | 23.2 | 15.5 | 8.3 | 197.5 |
Source: Meteoblue

Taal has two seasons: dry from November to April, and wet during the rest of the year. The lowest minimum temperature does not drop below 20 °C (68 °F) while the highest maximum temperature of 34.5 °C (94.1 °F) occurs from March to July of each year.

=== Barangays ===
Taal is politically subdivided into 42 barangays, as shown in the matrix below. Each barangay consists of puroks and some have sitios.

| PSGC | Barangay | Population | | | ±% p.a. | |
| | | 2024 | | 2010 | | |
|---|---|---|---|---|---|---|
| 041029001 | Apacay | 3.4% | 2,117 | 1,955 | ▴ | 0.55% |
| 041029002 | Balisong | 5.0% | 3,097 | 2,839 | ▴ | 0.60% |
| 041029003 | Bihis | 1.1% | 702 | 572 | ▴ | 1.43% |
| 041029004 | Bolbok | 1.8% | 1,131 | 1,027 | ▴ | 0.67% |
| 041029005 | Buli | 6.6% | 4,033 | 3,460 | ▴ | 1.07% |
| 041029006 | Butong | 8.0% | 4,926 | 4,627 | ▴ | 0.44% |
| 041029007 | Carasuche | 1.2% | 766 | 669 | ▴ | 0.94% |
| 041029008 | Cawit | 3.5% | 2,150 | 1,843 | ▴ | 1.07% |
| 041029009 | Caysasay | 1.0% | 610 | 577 | ▴ | 0.39% |
| 041029010 | Cubamba | 1.5% | 904 | 772 | ▴ | 1.10% |
| 041029011 | Cultihan | 3.2% | 1,948 | 1,812 | ▴ | 0.50% |
| 041029012 | Gahol | 2.0% | 1,202 | 1,060 | ▴ | 0.88% |
| 041029013 | Halang | 2.3% | 1,410 | 1,250 | ▴ | 0.84% |
| 041029014 | Iba | 4.8% | 2,962 | 2,633 | ▴ | 0.82% |
| 041029015 | Ilog | 1.9% | 1,183 | 1,113 | ▴ | 0.42% |
| 041029016 | Imamawo | 1.1% | 700 | 615 | ▴ | 0.90% |
| 041029017 | Ipil | 1.3% | 796 | 712 | ▴ | 0.78% |
| 041029018 | Luntal | 2.1% | 1,315 | 1,186 | ▴ | 0.72% |
| 041029019 | Mahabang Lodlod | 2.0% | 1,218 | 1,089 | ▴ | 0.78% |
| 041029020 | Niogan | 0.7% | 411 | 341 | ▴ | 1.30% |
| 041029021 | Pansol | 1.4% | 881 | 819 | ▴ | 0.51% |
| 041029022 | Poblacion 11 | 0.5% | 294 | 355 | ▾ | −1.30% |
| 041029023 | Poblacion 1 | 0.7% | 419 | 401 | ▴ | 0.30% |
| 041029024 | Poblacion 10 | 1.1% | 700 | 760 | ▾ | −0.57% |
| 041029025 | Poblacion 12 | 0.5% | 283 | 249 | ▴ | 0.89% |
| 041029026 | Poblacion 2 | 0.5% | 280 | 323 | ▾ | −0.99% |
| 041029027 | Poblacion 3 | 1.2% | 760 | 918 | ▾ | −1.30% |
| 041029028 | Poblacion 4 | 0.5% | 284 | 395 | ▾ | −2.26% |
| 041029029 | Poblacion 5 | 2.9% | 1,805 | 1,710 | ▴ | 0.38% |
| 041029030 | Poblacion 6 | 1.4% | 858 | 828 | ▴ | 0.25% |
| 041029031 | Poblacion 7 | 0.3% | 158 | 258 | ▾ | −3.34% |
| 041029032 | Poblacion 8 | 1.7% | 1,036 | 761 | ▴ | 2.16% |
| 041029033 | Poblacion 9 | 1.6% | 977 | 925 | ▴ | 0.38% |
| 041029034 | Pook | 2.1% | 1,316 | 1,077 | ▴ | 1.40% |
| 041029044 | Seiran | 4.9% | 2,995 | 2,678 | ▴ | 0.78% |
| 041029045 | Laguile | 4.5% | 2,790 | 2,544 | ▴ | 0.64% |
| 041029046 | Latag | 1.6% | 960 | 950 | ▴ | 0.07% |
| 041029047 | Tierra Alta | 1.6% | 963 | 893 | ▴ | 0.52% |
| 041029048 | Tulo | 4.4% | 2,717 | 2,370 | ▴ | 0.95% |
| 041029049 | Tatlong Maria | 2.1% | 1,287 | 1,159 | ▴ | 0.73% |
| 041029050 | Poblacion 13 | 0.8% | 477 | 449 | ▴ | 0.42% |
| 041029051 | Poblacion 14 | 0.8% | 506 | 529 | ▾ | −0.31% |
| | Total | | 61,559 | 51,503 | ▴ | 1.24% |

== Demographics ==
Population census of Taal
| Year | Pop. | ±% p.a. |
|---|---|---|
| 1903 | 17,525 | — |
| 1918 | 21,155 | +1.26% |
| 1939 | 23,004 | +0.40% |
| 1948 | 26,044 | +1.39% |
| 1960 | 23,000 | −1.03% |
| 1970 | 24,907 | +0.80% |
| 1975 | 26,705 | +1.41% |
| 1980 | 29,699 | +2.15% |
| 1990 | 34,925 | +1.63% |
| 1995 | 38,722 | +1.95% |
| 2000 | 43,455 | +2.50% |
| 2007 | 51,459 | +2.36% |
| 2010 | 51,503 | +0.03% |
| 2015 | 56,327 | +1.72% |
| 2020 | 61,460 | +1.85% |
| 2024 | 61,559 | +0.04% |
Source: Philippine Statistics Authority

In the 2024 census, Taal had a population of 61,559 people. The population density was 2,100 inhabitants per square kilometer (5,400/sq mi).

The first census in 1903 recorded a total population of 17,525. The 2007 population was 51,459 growing at 2.44% annually over the previous 7 years, with 7,961 households. By 2010, the population slightly increased to 51,503.

== Economy ==
Taal Public Market

Poverty incidence of Taal (%)

Source: Philippine Statistics Authority

== Cultural events ==
- The EL PASUBAT Festival, celebrated annually during the month of April, is the conglomeration of the trademarks of Taal. "EL PASUBAT" stands for Empanada, Longganisa, Panutsa, Suman, Balisong, barong tagalog, Tapa, Tamales, Tawilis, Tulingan — the delicacies and crafts that Taal is known for.
- The Feast of St. Martin of Tours is held November 11 every year. Celebrations are in the form of prayer, hymns, declamation, flower offerings and big religious processions. Most families celebrate with food and drinks for visitors thereafter.
- The Feast of Our Lady of Caysasay, the well-known miraculous image of the Immaculate Conception, is celebrated every December 8. A joint town fiesta celebrated on December 9 honoring both Our Lady of Caysasay and Saint Martin of Tours.
- Lua is a traditional declamation in the vernacular recited by a maiden to honor the Virgin Mary or a boy in praise of a male saint like Saint Martin of Tours. In the procession, young girls and ladies in their pretty gowns make up the hila (pull), so called because they are supposed to pull the cord of lights originating from the Virgin's karosa (procession carriage) bedecked with flowers.

== Local products and delicacies ==
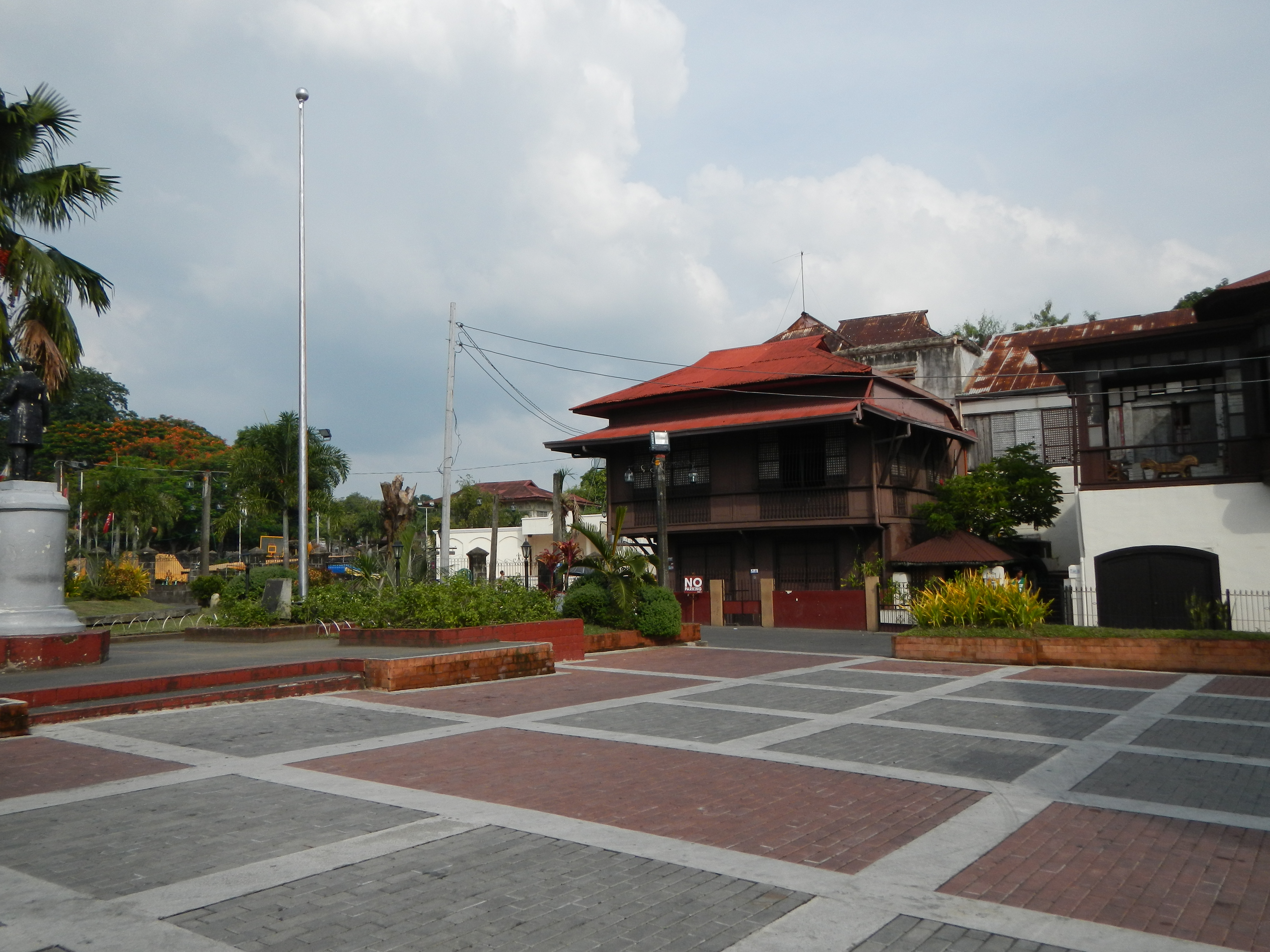
Plaza and heritage houses in Taal

Since the Spanish period, the people of Taal lived by farming and commerce. The main produce are cotton, cacao and sugar which are made through the use of crude sugar mill called trapeche. Weaving and embroidery of barong and camisa (blouses) made from piña are popular home industries. Local embroidery businesses later expanded their products to include curtains, piano covers, pillowcases, tablecloth, table napkins and bed covers, adding more fame already earned by Taal embroidery.

Other products produced in the town are balisong (butterfly knife) and various food treats such as the panocha (peanut brittle candy) and suman salehiya (a sweet suman), tapa (cured pork) and the local longganisa, all of which are available at the public market. Popular Taal dishes include adobo sa dilaw (yellow adobo) and sinaing na tulingan (bonita fish soup).

== Education ==
The Taal Schools District Office governs all educational institutions within the municipality. It oversees the management and operations of all private and public, from primary to secondary schools.

=== Primary and elementary schools ===
- Aguedo Lota Asinas Memorial Elementary School
- Antonio Bonsol Elementary School
- Apacay Elementary School
- Balisong Elementary School
- Blessed Elena Kindergarten School
- Buli Elementary School
- Butong Elementary School
- Carmino Biscocho Memorial Elementary School
- Casa de San Domenico Learning Center
- Cultihan-Bolbok Elementary School
- Governor Vicente Noble Memorial Elementary School
- Halang Elementary School
- Isabelo Baleros Memorial Elementary School
- Latag Elementary School
- Luntal Elementary School
- Our Lady of Caysasay Academy
- Southampton E.D.G.E. Montessori School
- St. Martin Montessori
- Taal Central School
- Tulo Elementary School

=== Secondary schools ===
- Cubamba Integrated School
- Fame Academy of Science & Technology
- Rizal College of Taal
- Taal National High School
- Taal Senior High School

=== Higher educational institution ===
- Rizal College of Taal

== Notable personalities ==
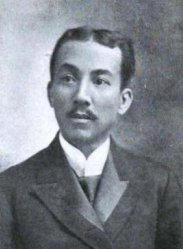
Felipe Agoncillo

=== Philippine Revolution ===
- Gliceria de Villavicencio was named as the “godmother of the revolutionary forces” by Gen. Emilio Aguinaldo. She supported the revolution against the Spaniards, and later the Americans inflamed by the death of her husband, Eulalio Villavicencio, in February 1898.
- Felipe Agoncillo was a revolutionary hero, statesman, and diplomat Philippine Republic to the United States and to the Treaty of Paris in 1898.
- Marcela Agoncillo is best known as "The Mother of the Philippine Flag" for being the maker of the present flag of the Philippines, first unfurled at the declaration of Philippine Independence on June 12, 1898, in Kawit, Cavite.
- Vicente Ilustre was associated with other Filipinos like José Rizal, Marcelo H. Del Pilar, Galicano Apacible, and others in Spain. He became a member of the Philippine Commission under Governor-General Francis Burton Harrison where he served as president of the committee for Mindanao and Sulu. Thereafter, he became a Senator in the First Senate of the Philippines. He was also instrumental in the installation of public light and water utilities in Taal.
- Ananías Diokno was the only Tagalog general to lead a full-scale military expedition to the Visayas against the Spanish forces. He became governor of Capiz.
- Galicano Apacible was a co-founder of La Solidaridad with his cousin José Rizal. He later co-founded the Nacionalista Party and served as Governor of Batangas, assemblyman, and agriculture and natural resources secretary. His brother, León Apacible, was a lawyer who fought in the revolution.

=== Modern era ===
- Ramón Diokno, Senator and Supreme Court Justice
- Jose W. Diokno, Senator and Secretary of Justice. The Sangguniang Bayan meets at the Sen. Jose W. Diokno Legislative Hall at the Municipal Hall.
- Father Fernando Suarez, a Catholic priest known worldwide for faith healing, was born here in 1967.
- Benjamin Diokno, Secretary of Budget and Management 1998–2001, 2016–2019; Governor of Bangko Sentral ng Pilipinas 2019–2022; Secretary of Finance 2022–present
- Ogie Alcasid, Singer-songwriter, Television presenter, Comedian, Parodist, and Actor

== Gallery ==
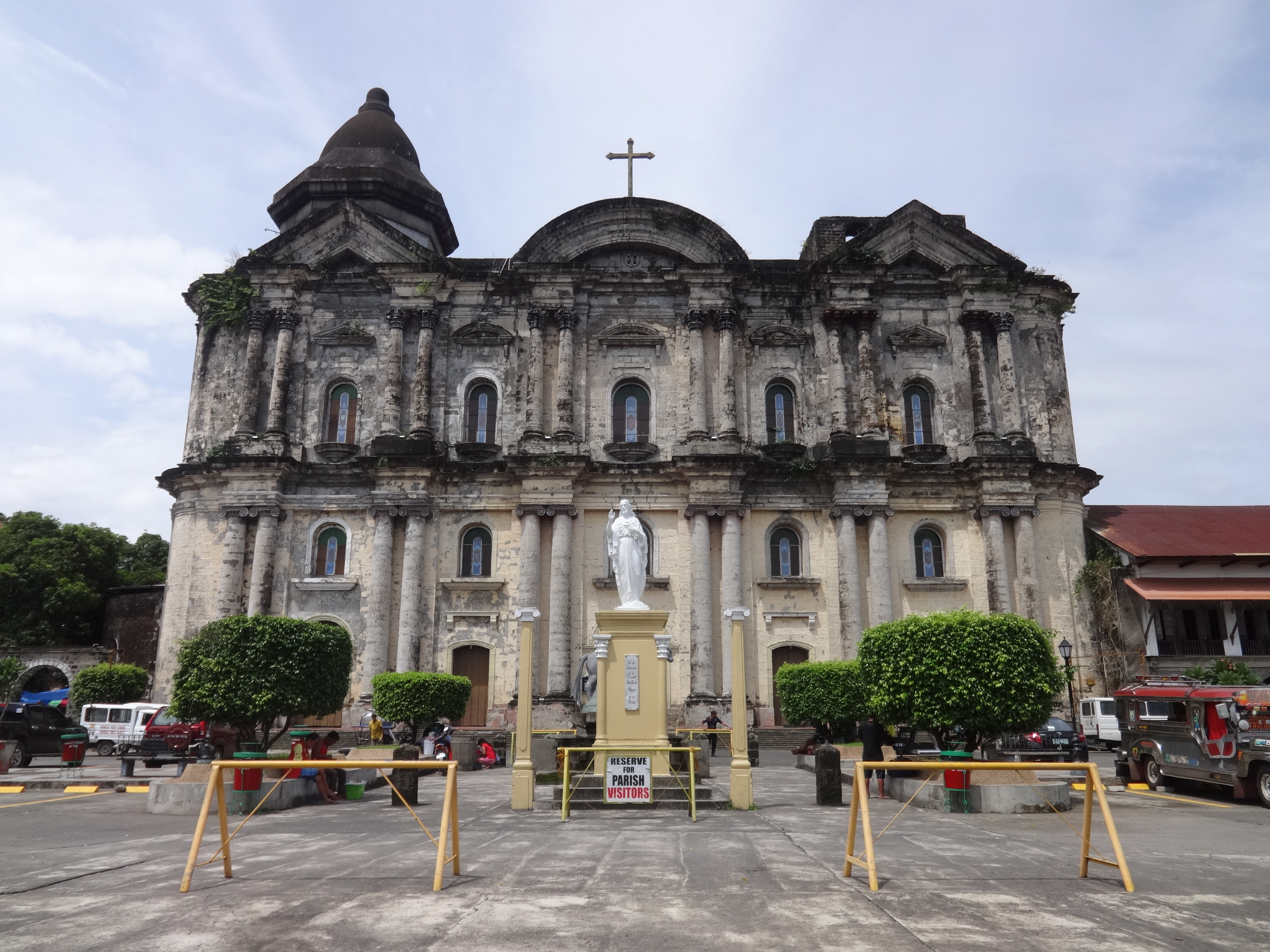
Taal Basilica

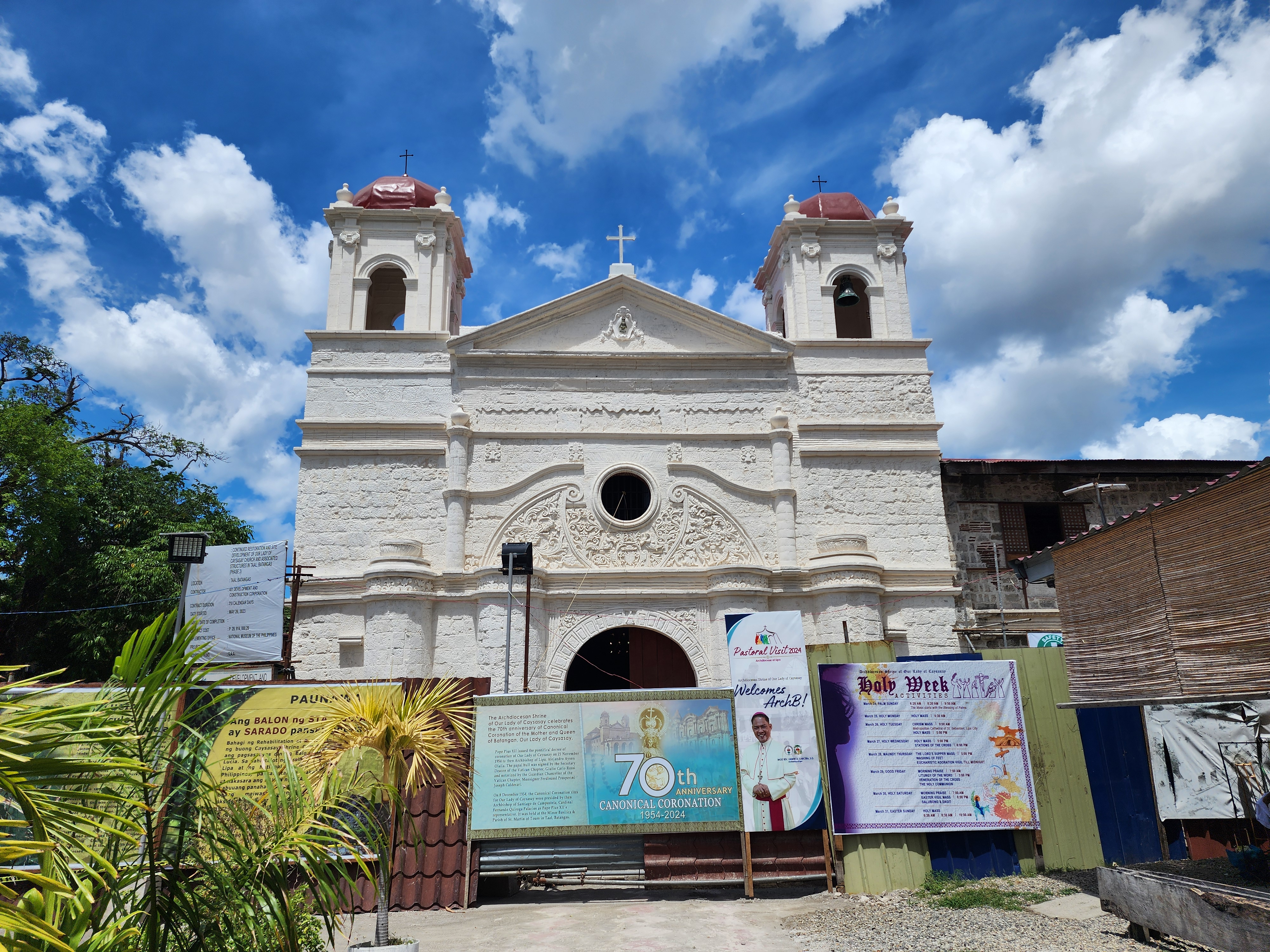
Archdiocesan Shrine of Our Lady of Caysasay

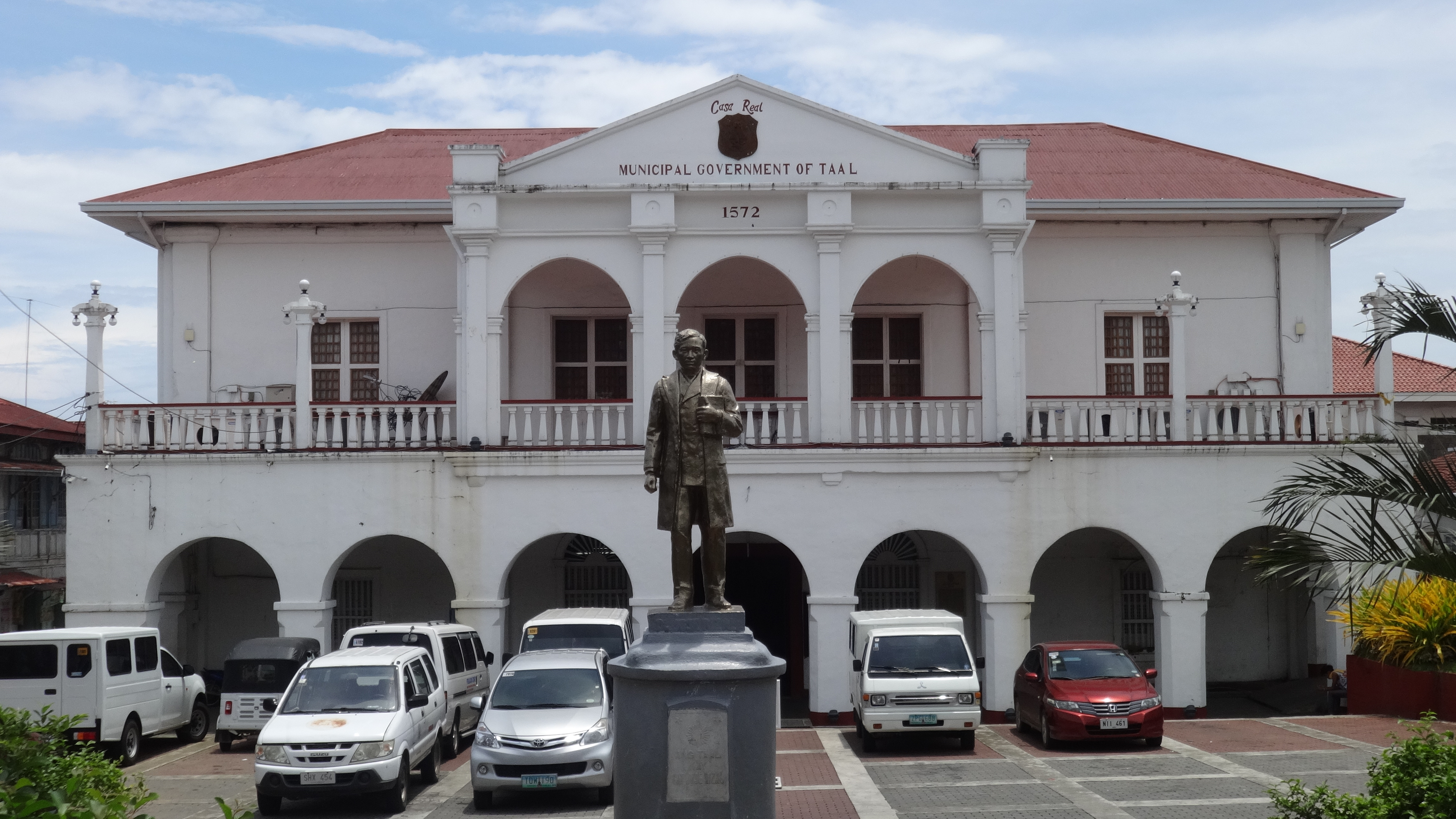
Municipal hall

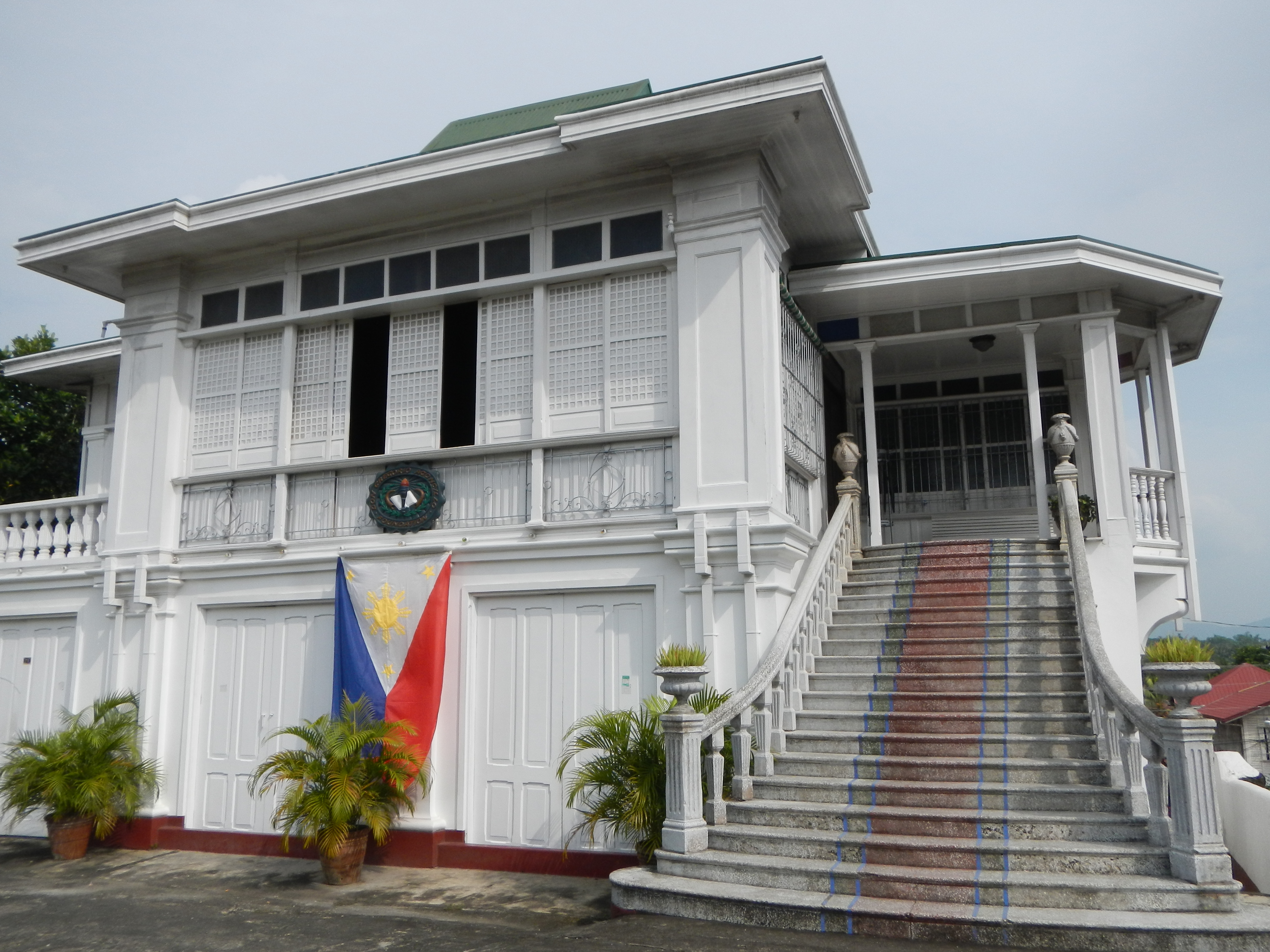
Felipe Agoncillo ancestral house

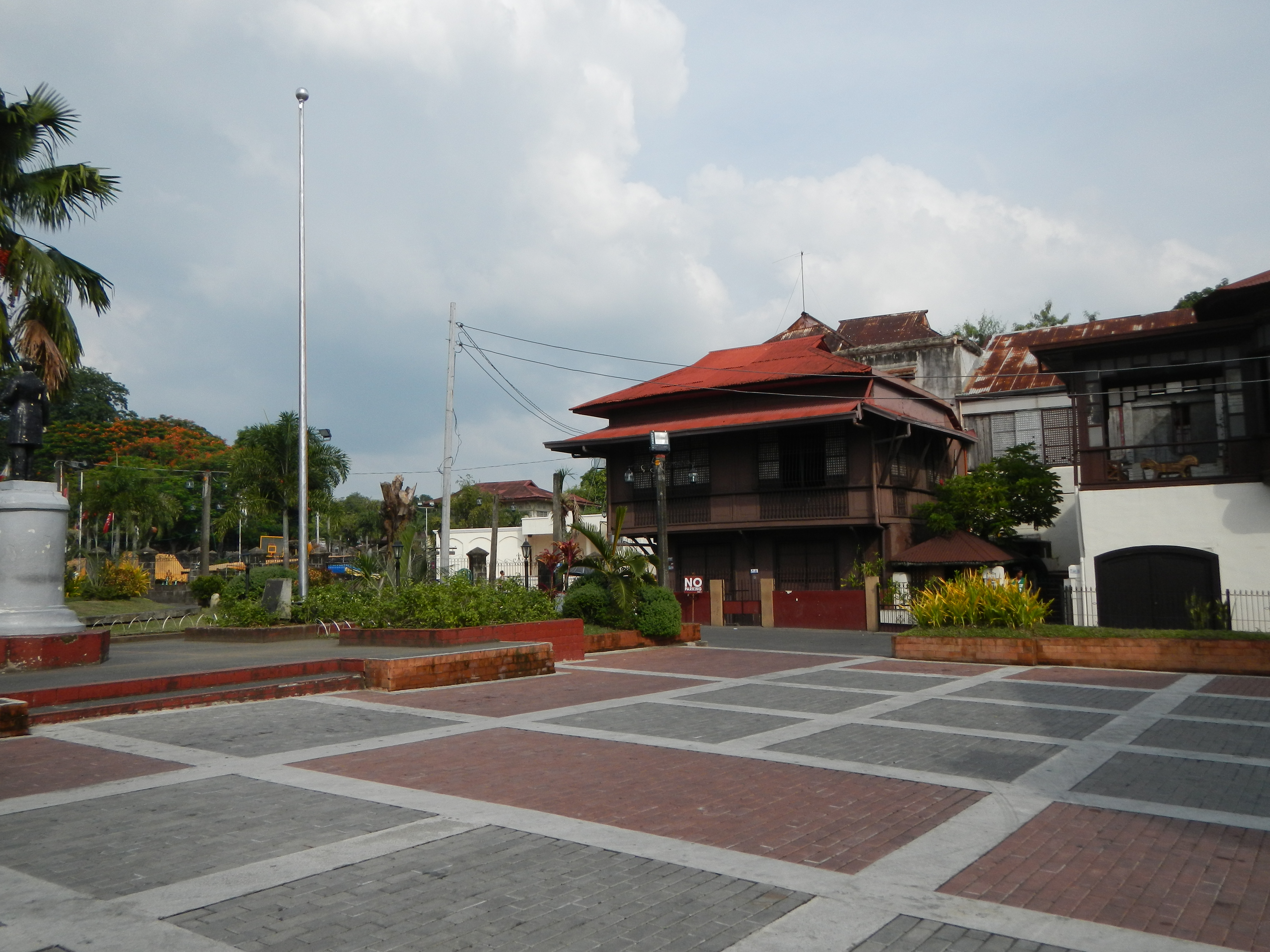
Taal Plaza

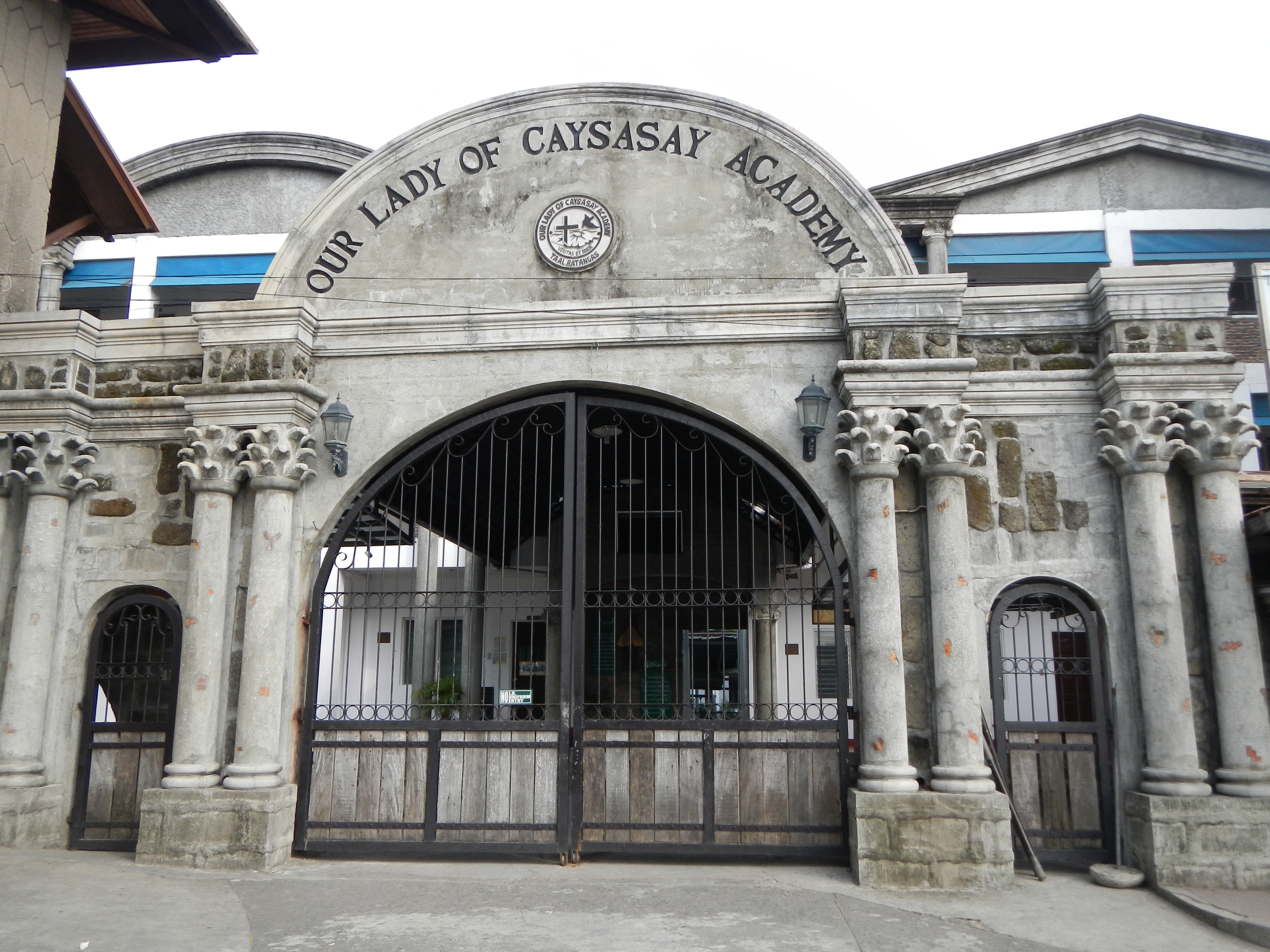
Our Lady of Caysasay Academy gate

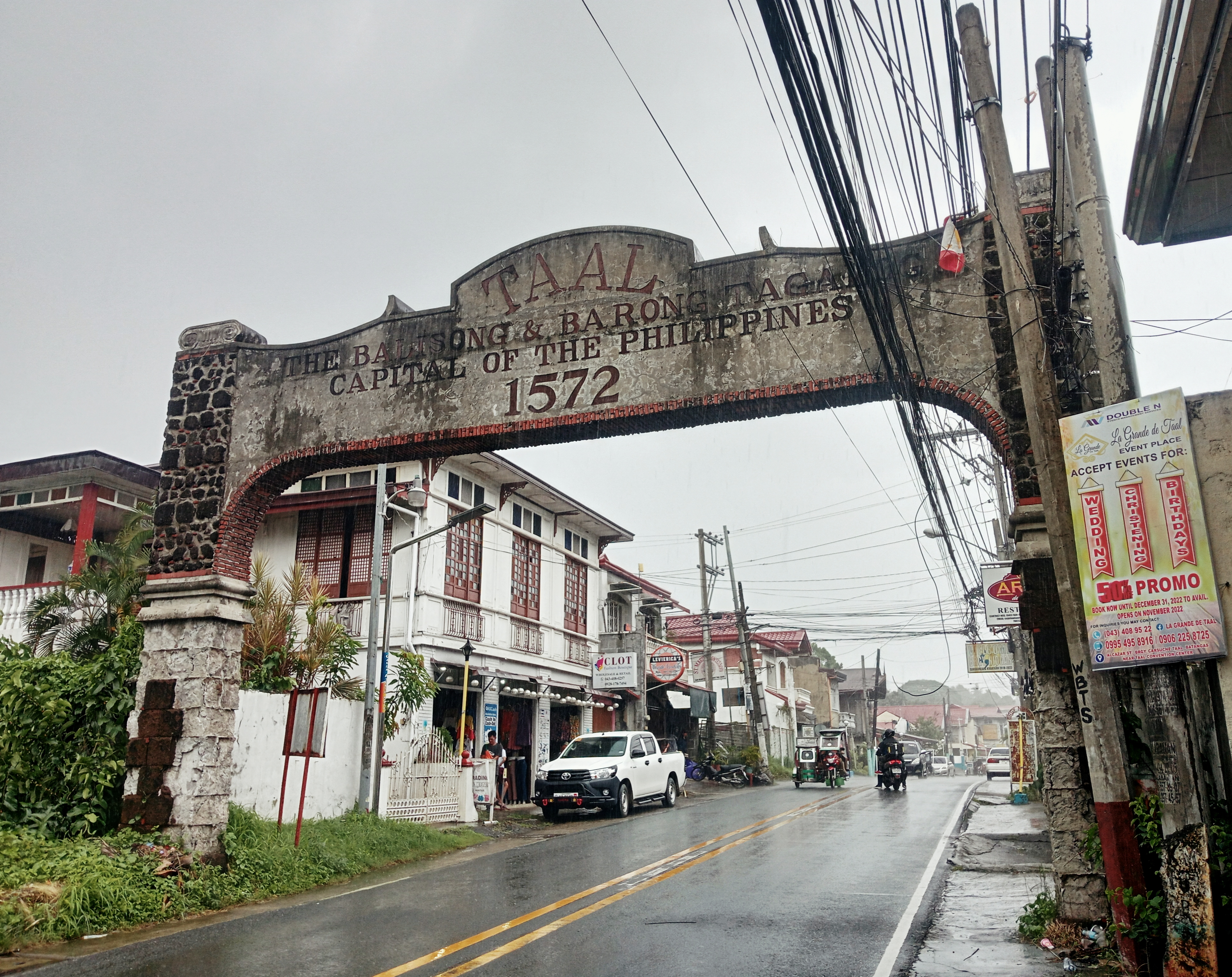
Arch at Taal town proper

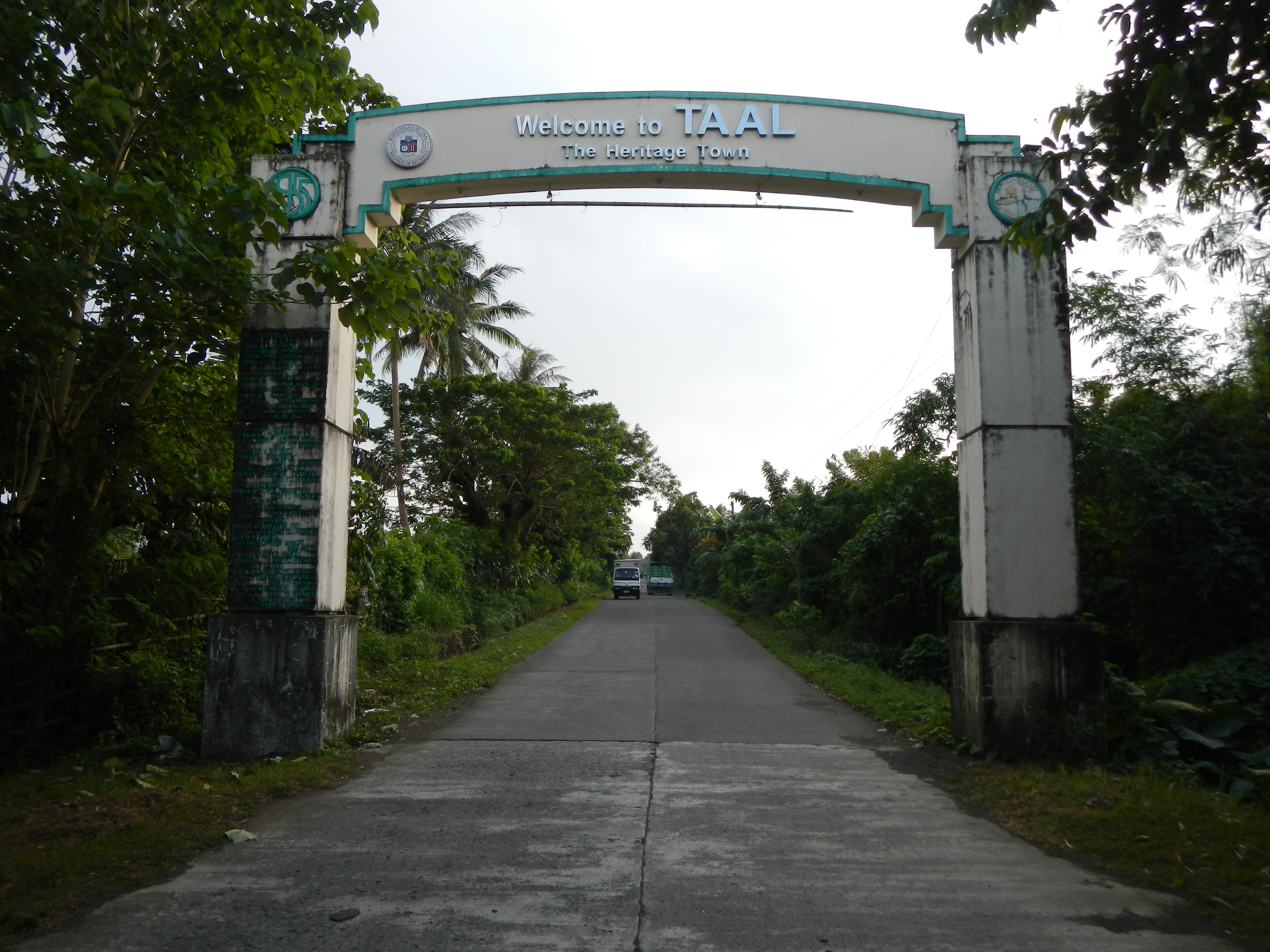
Welcome arch from San Nicolas

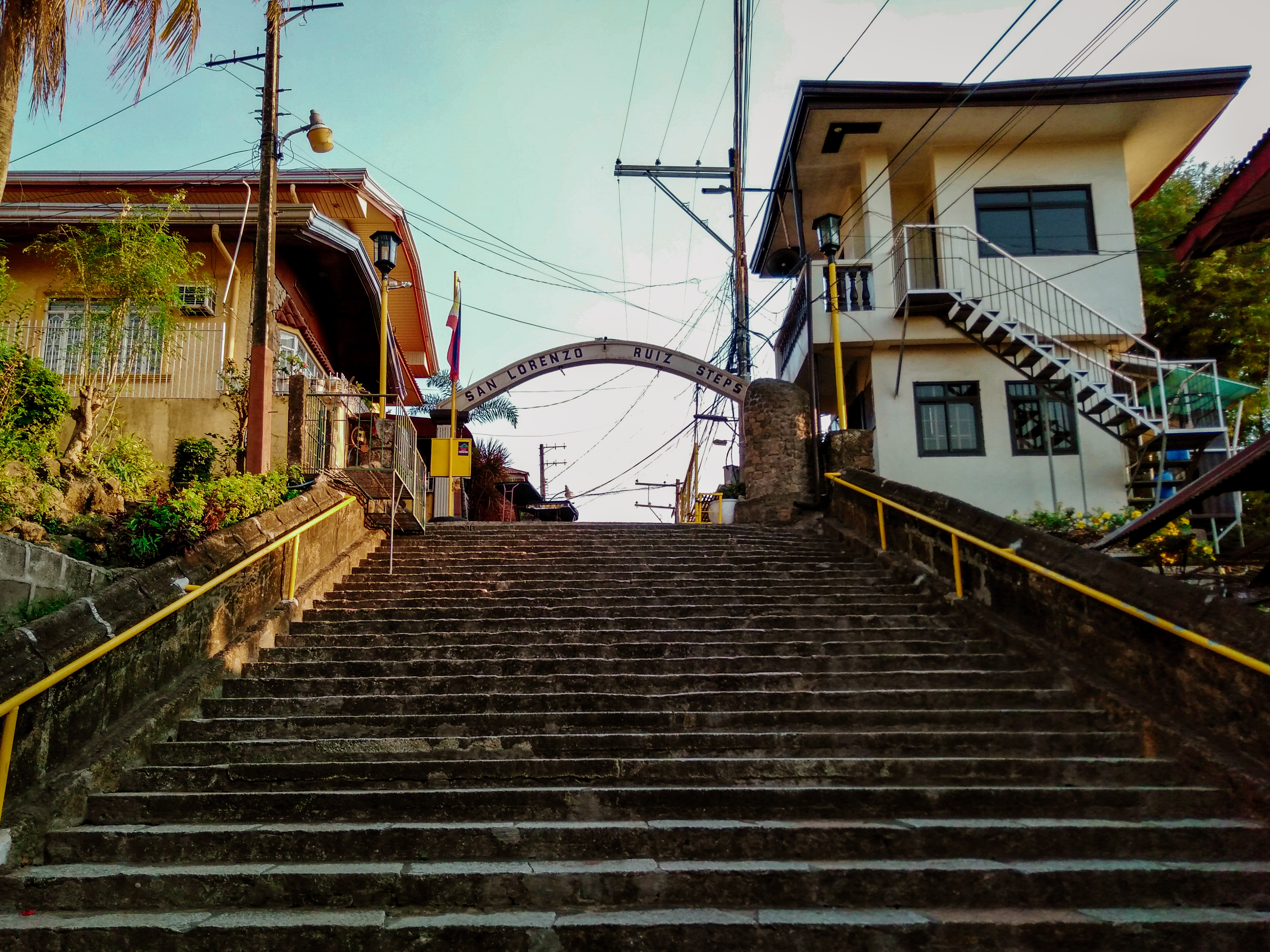
San Lorenzo Ruiz Steps

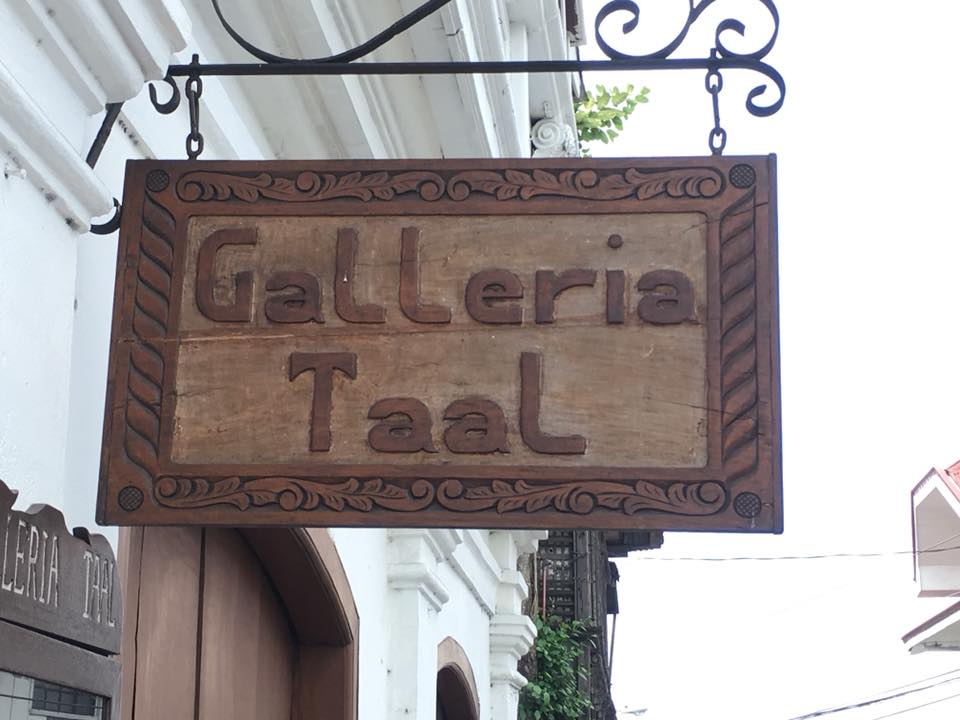
Galleria Taal

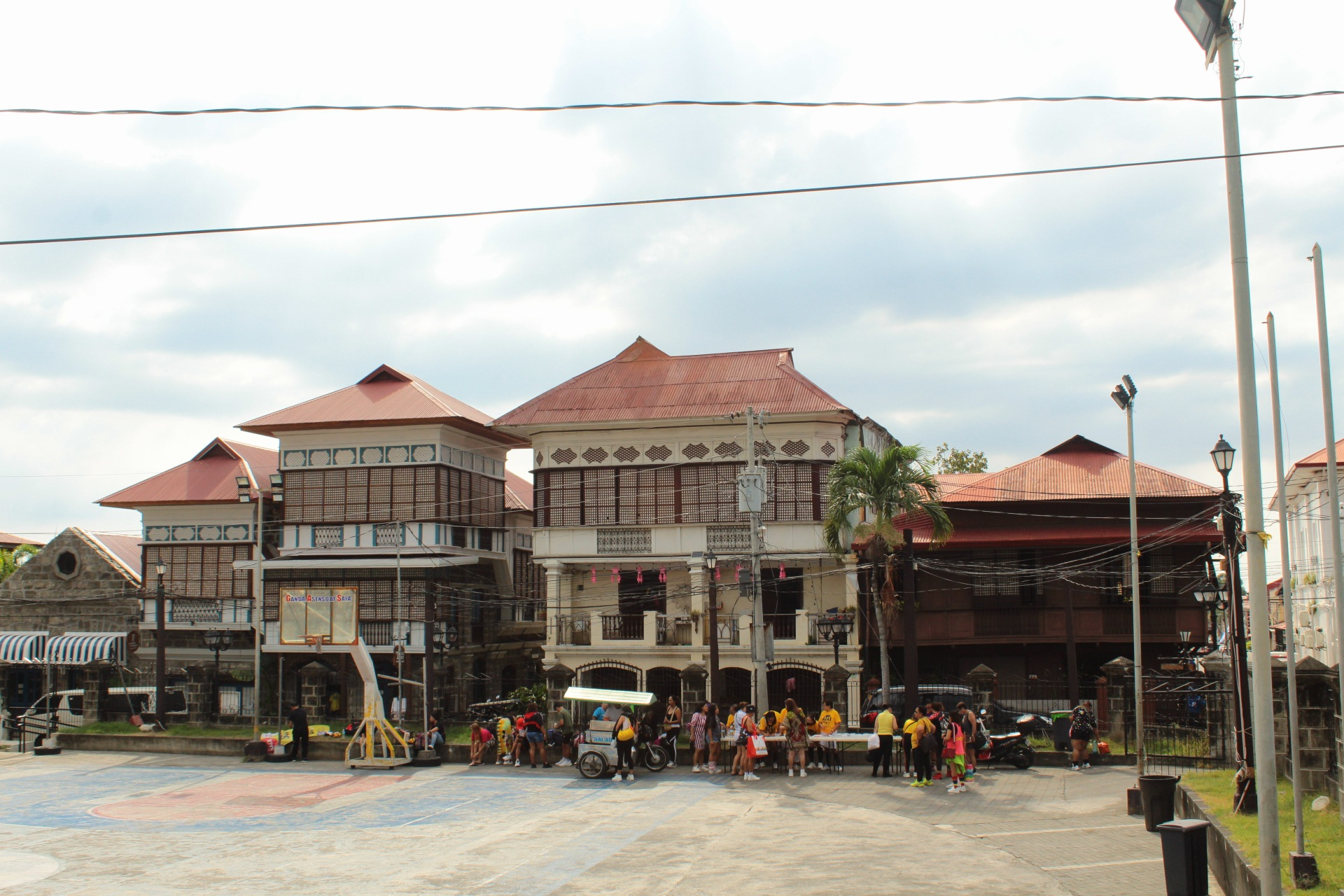
Ancestral houses

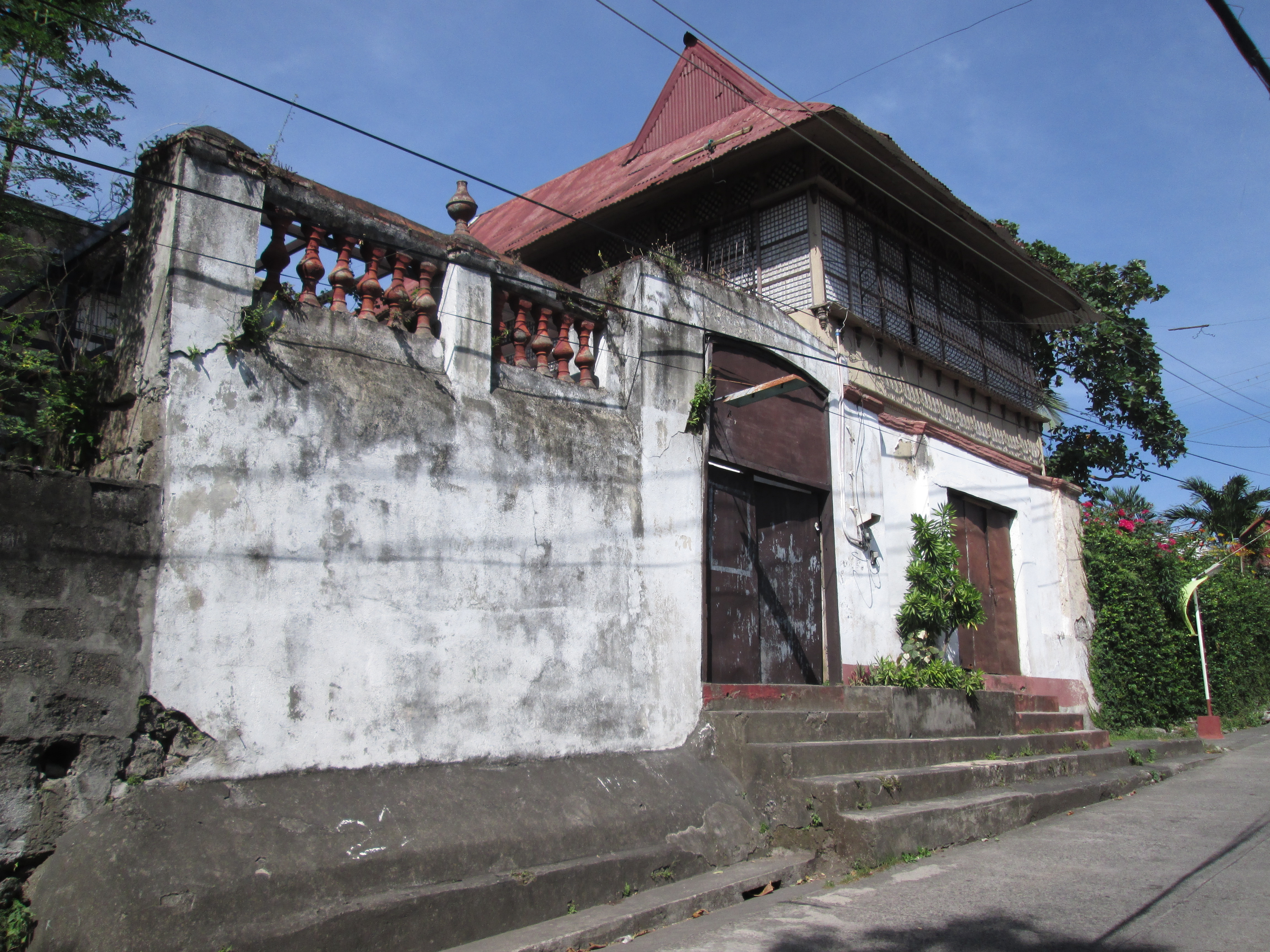
Agaton Orosa House

== See also ==
- Basilica de San Martin de Tours (Taal) – the biggest Catholic Basilica Church in the Far East
- Our Lady of Caysasay
- Our Lady of Caysasay Academy

| Preceded by Balayan as Capital of Balayan | Capital of Batangas; 1732–1754 | Succeeded by Batangas |
