= Palico–Balayan–Batangas Road =

Secondary road in the Philippines

Palico–Balayan–Batangas Road

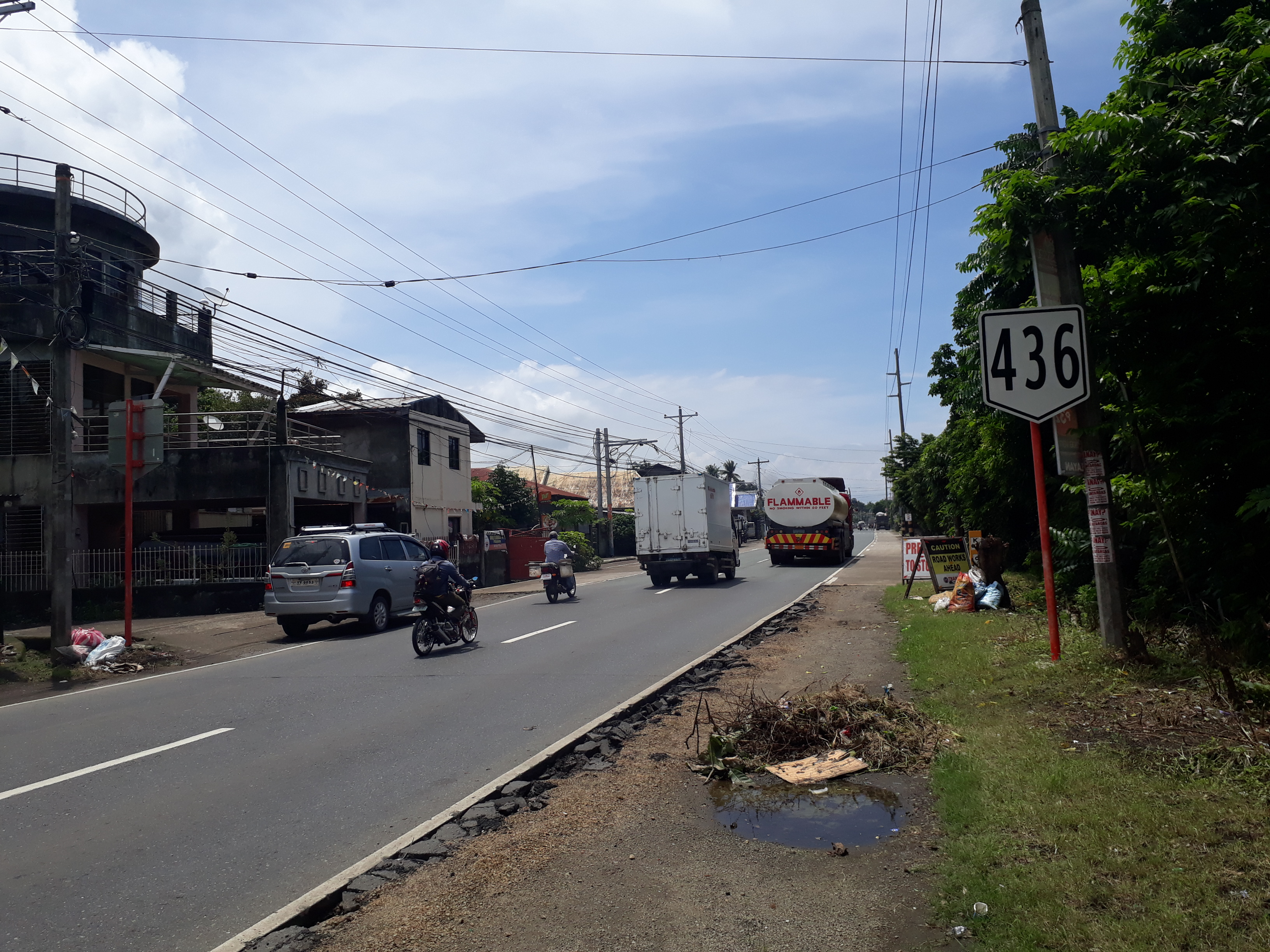
- Palico–Balayan–Batangas Road in Balayan, Batangas with a reassurance marker.

Route information
- Maintained by the Department of Public Works and Highways
- Length: 60.37 km (37.51 mi)

Major junctions
- From: N407 (Tagaytay–Nasugbu Highway) in Tuy
- N409 (Balibago–Balayan Road) in Balayan; N410 (Diokno Highway) in Lemery; Taal–Lemery Diversion Road in Lemery; N656 (Santa Teresita–Alitagtag Diversion Road) in Santa Teresita; N433 (Banaybanay–Mojon–Cuenca Road) in San Luis; N434-1 (Batangas City–San Pascual–Bauan Bypass Road) in Bauan; N434 (Batangas Port Diversion Road) in Batangas City
- To: N4 (Jose P. Laurel Highway) / N437 (P. Burgos Street) in Batangas City

Location
- Country: Philippines
- Provinces: Batangas
- Major cities: Calaca, Batangas City
- Towns: Tuy; Balayan; Lemery; Taal; Santa Teresita; San Luis; Alitagtag; Bauan; San Pascual

Highway system
- Roads in the Philippines; Highways; Expressways; List
← N435	→ N437

National Route 436 (N436) or the Palico–Balayan–Batangas Road is a 60.37-kilometer (37.51 mi) secondary national road in Batangas, Philippines, that forms part of the Philippine highway network. It is a two-to-four lane, secondary road connecting various municipalities and two cities of southern and western Batangas.

== Route description ==
=== Tuy to Balayan ===
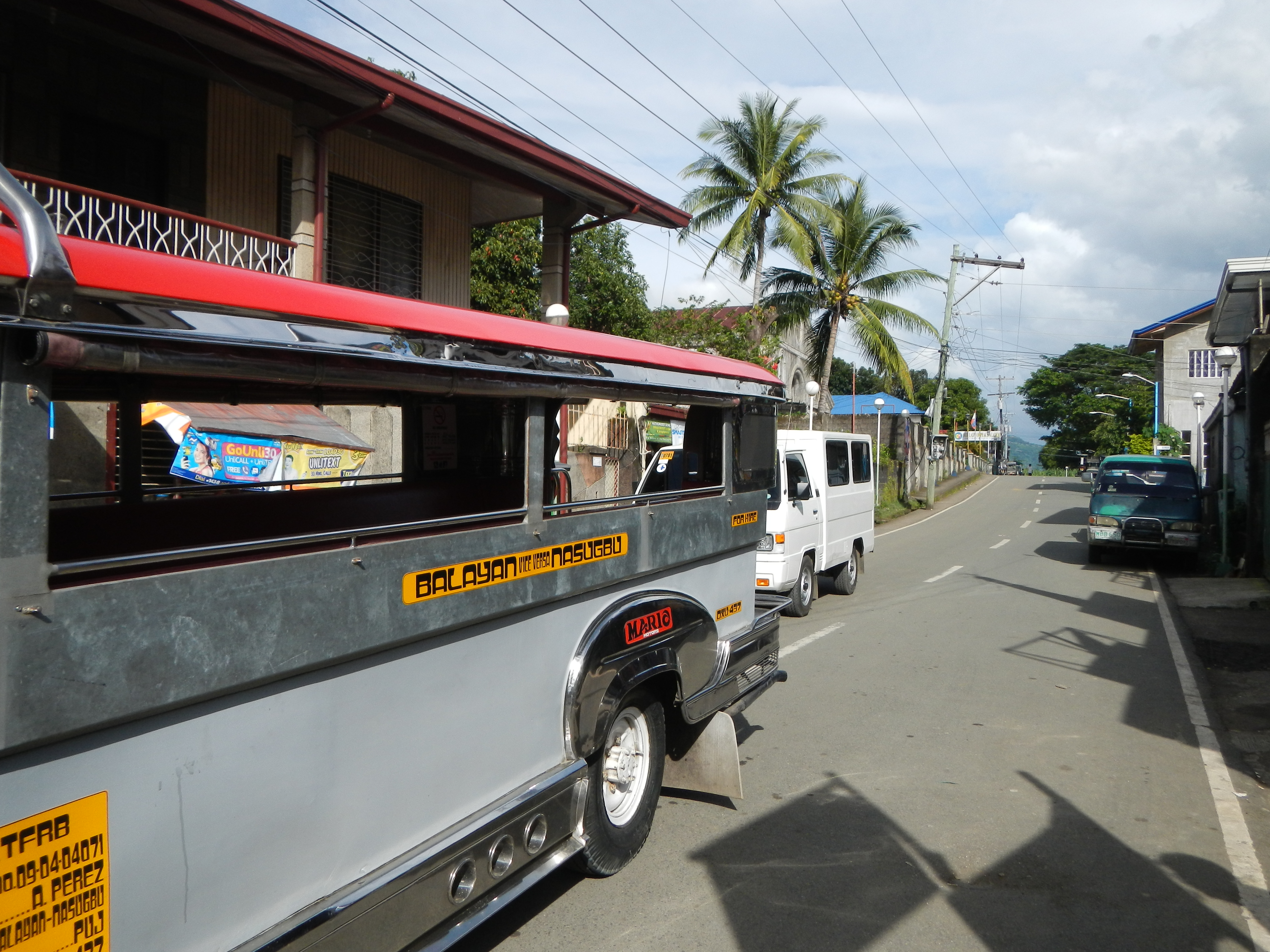
The highway as Rizal Street in Tuy town proper

The highway begins at Palico Junction, a roundabout interchange in Tuy. It runs southeast and enters the Tuy poblacion, where it is named as Rizal Street. It then veers south towards another roundabout in Balayan, where it veers southeast, bypassing the town proper.

=== Balayan to Batangas City ===
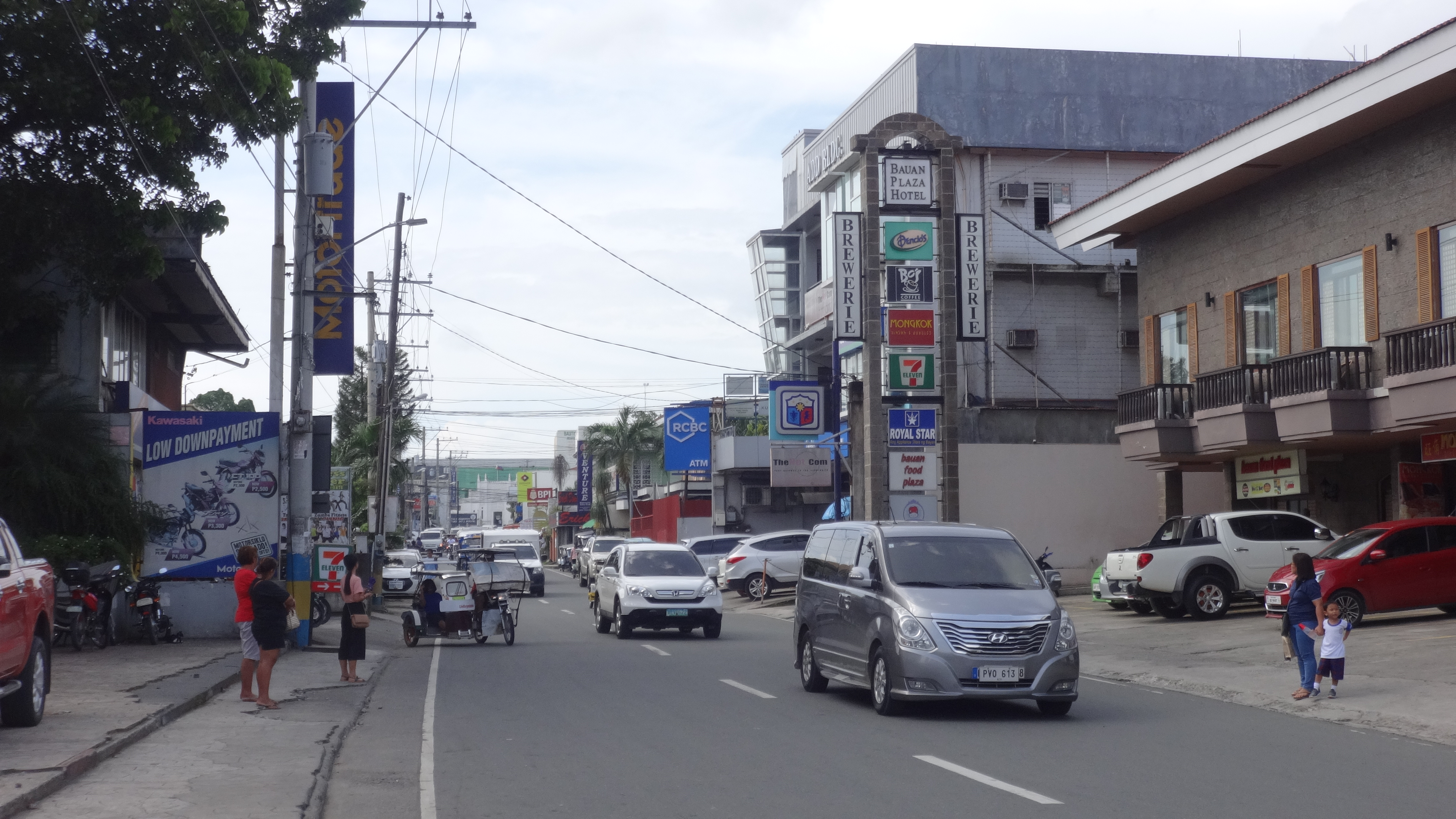
The highway as J.P. Rizal Street in Bauan

In Barangay Gimalas, Balayan, the highway follows the alignment of Gimalas Old Road before entering Calaca. It then passes near the Calaca Power Plant and the Calaca city proper before meeting the southern terminus of Diokno Highway at Barangay Mahayahay, Lemery. It then traverses Lemery town proper as Ilustre Avenue, crosses the Pansipit River into Taal, and continues east as Calle Marcela Mariño Agoncillo, which is one-way westbound up to its intersection with Calle H. del Castillo and Calle Vicente Ilustre, passing the Taal Basilica before becoming Calle Jose P. Rizal.

The route proceeds through Santa Teresita and briefly in San Luis and Alitagtag before entering Bauan. In the Bauan town proper, it is locally known as F. Mangobos Street before turning south onto J.P. Rizal Street, which is one-way southbound, and east onto Kapitan Ponso Street, which is one-way eastbound up to Buendia Street. It then traverses San Pascual and Batangas City, where it is alternatively known as Calicanto Road and ends at the junction with Jose P. Laurel Highway and P. Burgos Street (Manila–Batangas Pier Road) in Barangay Calicanto.

== History ==
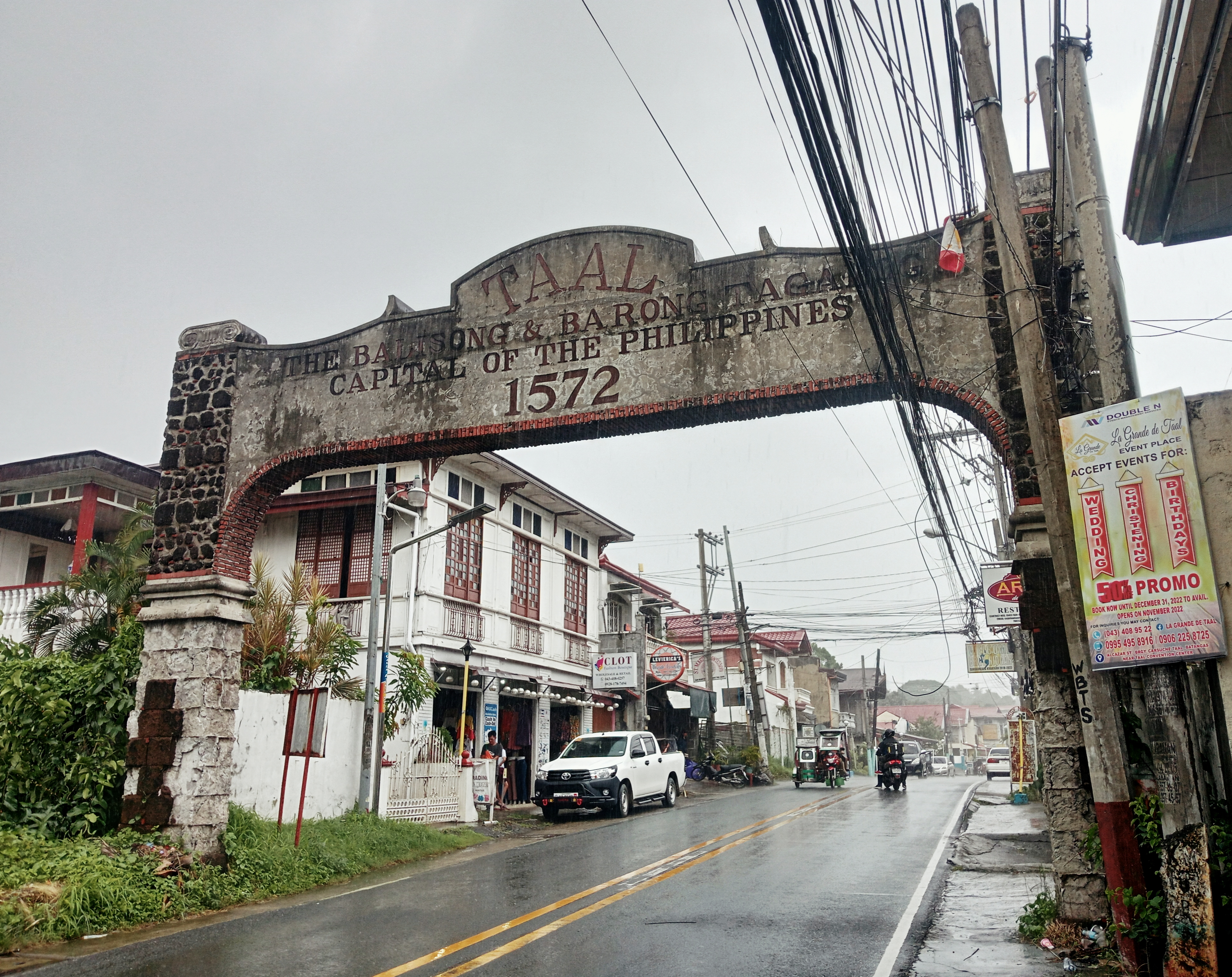
Taal Heritage Town Welcome Arch along the route.

The highway originally existed as the Tuy–Batangas section of the Batangas–Bauan–Nasugbu Road, an old road which linked Nasugbu with the then-town of Batangas. The latter also formed part of Highway 17 that linked Imus, Cavite with Batangas. New alignment bypassing the downtowns of Balayan and Calaca were later added to form the present-day highway.

== Intersections ==
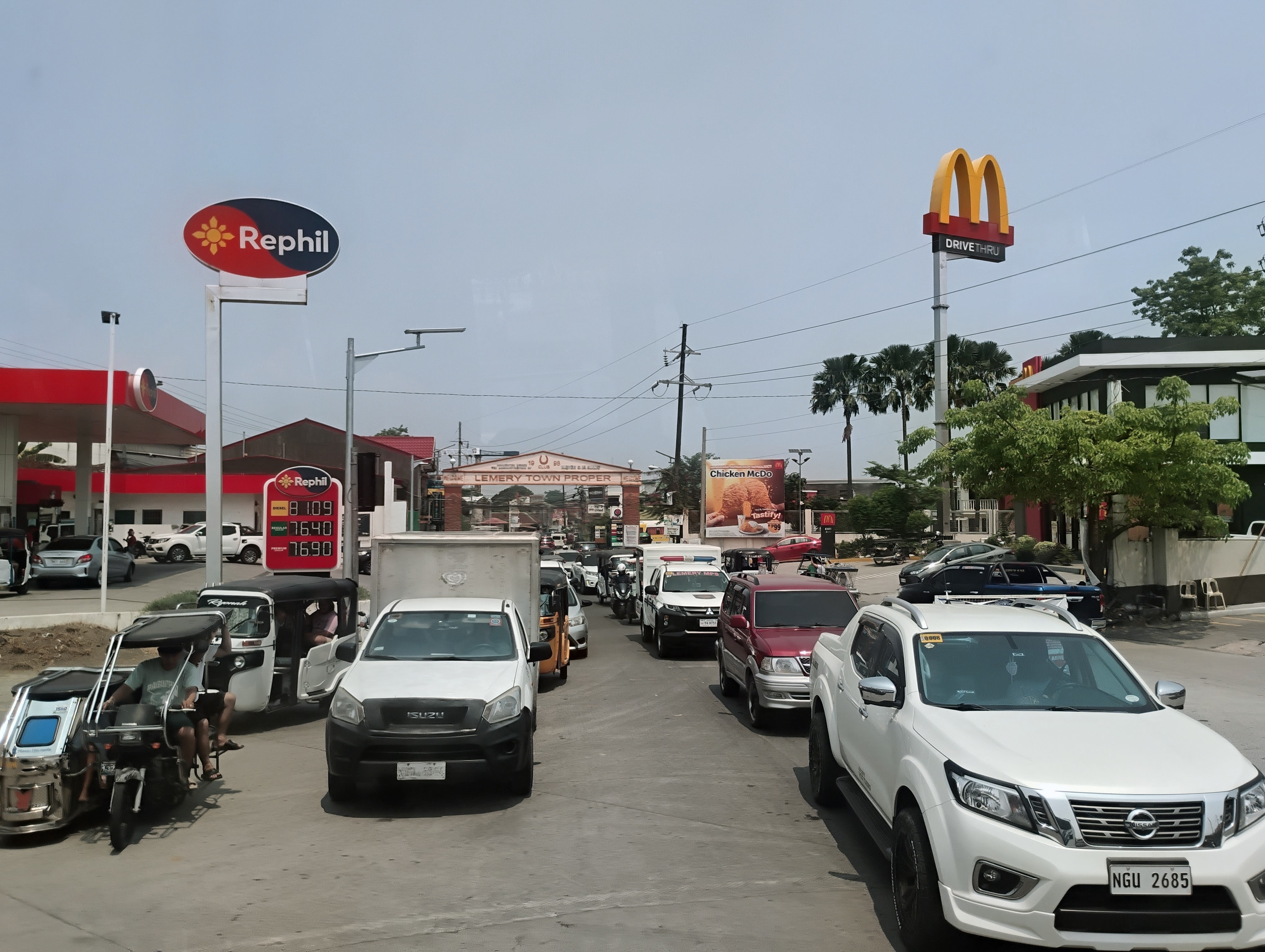
Lemery Junction, an intersection with the Lemery–Taal Diversion Road in Lemery, Batangas

The entire route is located in Batangas. Intersections are numbered by kilometer posts, with Rizal Park in Manila designated as kilometer zero.

City/Municipality	km	mi	Destinations	Notes
Tuy			N407 (Tagaytay–Nasugbu Highway) – Nasugbu, Lian, Tagaytay	Palico Rotunda. Western terminus.
Tuy			Tuy Diversion Road	North end of diversion road. This segment between both ends of the diversion road is known locally as J.P. Rizal Street.
Tuy			Tuy Diversion Road	South end of diversion road.
Balayan			N409 (Balibago–Balayan Road) / Ermita Street – Calatagan, Lian	Balayan Rotunda.
Balayan			Don Sixto Castelo Lopez Street	Internal road leading to Balayan town proper.
Balayan			Balayan Diversion Road	Western end of diversion road. This segment between both ends of the diversion road is known locally as Gimalas Old Road.
Balayan			Balayan Diversion Road	Eastern end of diversion road.
Balayan			Caybunga–Pook Road	Internal road leading to various barangays at the foot of Mount Batulao.
Calaca			Batulao Road	Internal road leading to Brgy. Cahil which harbors a trail to the peak of Mount Batulao.
Calaca			Marasigan Street	Access to Calaca city proper.
Lemery			N410 (Diokno Highway) – Tagaytay, Alfonso, Laurel	
Lemery			Lemery–Agoncillo Road — San Nicolas, Laurel, Agoncillo	
Lemery			Lemery–Taal Diversion Road — San Nicolas	Bypasses Lemery and Taal town propers. West end of diversion road. This segment of the highway entering the town proper is known locally as Ilustre Avenue.
Taal			Calle Cota / Calle Ramon Diokno	One-way road scheme implemented due to traffic buildup. Road is known locally as Calle Marcela Mariño Agoncillo.
Taal			Calle Vicente Noble	Alternate access to San Nicolas. No left turn from this road.
Taal			Calle Jose P. Rizal / Calle Felipe Agoncillo	No right turn from junction.
Taal			Lemery–Taal Diversion Road	Eastern end of diversion road.
Taal–Santa Teresita boundary			Tawilisan–San Nicolas Road — San Nicolas, Agoncillo	
Santa Teresita			Santa Teresita–Calayaan–Ilog Road — Taal, San Luis	Internal road leading to the coastal barangays of Taal and San Luis.
Santa Teresita			N656 (Santa Teresita–Alitagtag Diversion Road) – Alitagtag, Cuenca, Lipa	Diversion road leading to N433 (Banaybanay–Mojon–Cuenca Road), bypassing Muzon junction.
San Luis–Alitagtag boundary			N433 (Banaybanay–Mojon–Cuenca Road) – Cuenca, San Jose, Lipa	Muzon Junction.
San Luis–Alitagtag boundary			Muzon–San Luis Road	Access to San Luis town proper.
Bauan			N434-1 (Batangas City–San Pascual–Bauan Bypass Road)	Alternate access to N4 (Jose P. Laurel Highway) and E2 (STAR Tollway).
Bauan			Bauan–Mabini Road — Mabini	Manghinao Crossing. Primary access to Mabini municipality; Tingloy island via Anilao and Talaga ports. This segment of the route entering Bauan town proper is known locally as F. Mangobos Street.
Bauan			F. Mangobos Street	One way road. Route turns south to J.P. Rizal Street.
Bauan			Kapitan Ponso Street	One way road. Route turns eastbound to Kapitan Ponso Street.
Bauan			Don Quintin Castillo Street	One way road.
San Pascual			San Pascual–San Mateo Road	Internal road leading to Brgy. San Mateo in San Pascual.
San Pascual			Caltex Road	Chevron Batangas Terminal perimeter road. Northern segment provides access to N434 (Batangas Port Diversion Road).
Batangas City			N434 (Batangas Port Diversion Road) / Bolbok Access Road – Batangas Port, Manila	Access to Batangas Port to the south and E2 (STAR Tollway) to the north.
Batangas City			N4 (Jose P. Laurel Highway) / N437 (P. Burgos Street) – Manila, Lipa	Eastern terminus.
1.000 mi = 1.609 km; 1.000 km = 0.621 mi: Incomplete access
