= Banaybanay–Mojon–Cuenca Road =

Secondary road in the Philippines

Banaybanay–Mojon–Cuenca Road

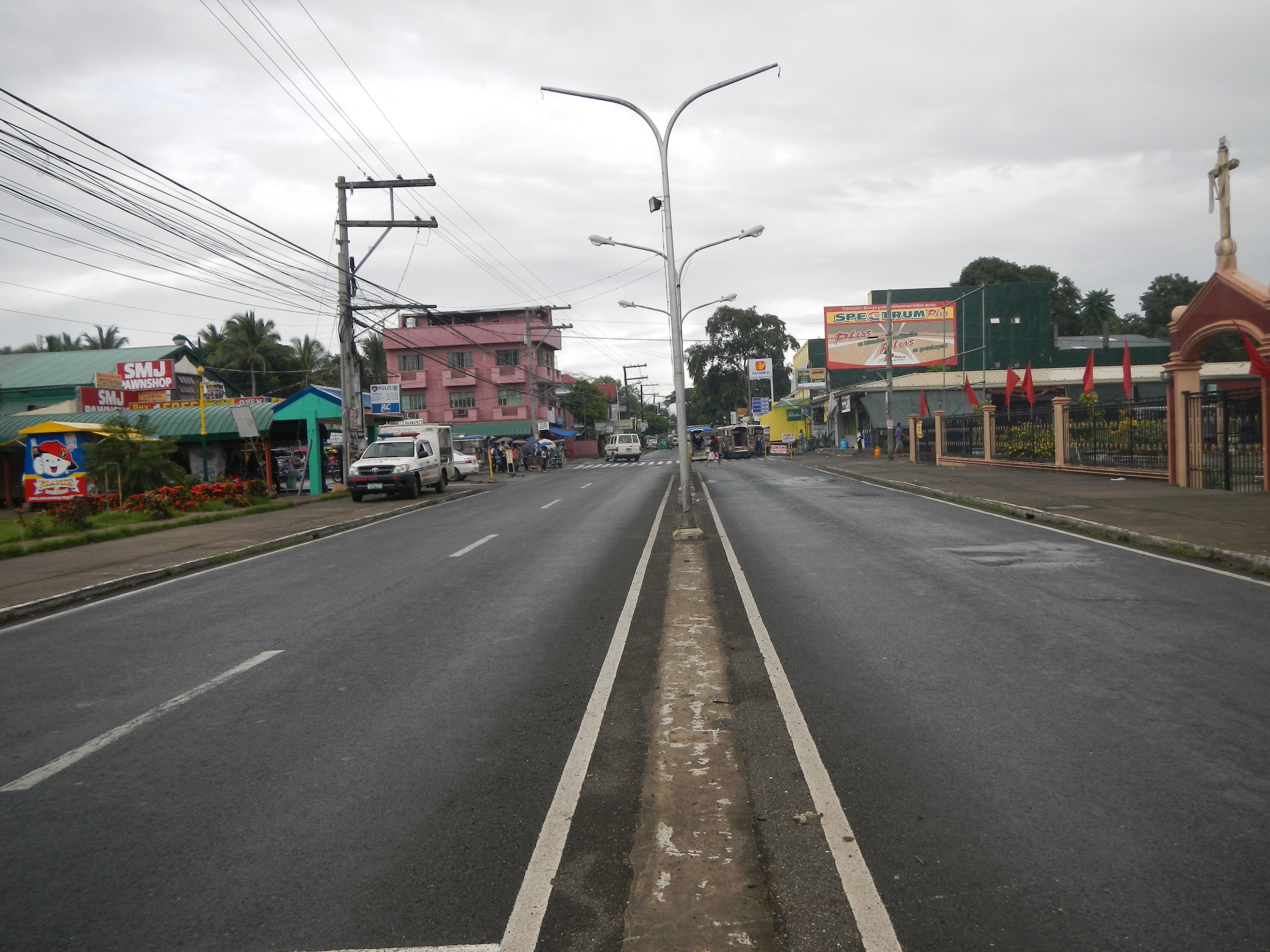
- Banaybanay–Mojon–Cuenca Road in Alitagtag town proper, Batangas

Route information
- Maintained by the Department of Public Works and Highways
- Length: 17.180 km (10.675 mi)

Major junctions
- East end: N4 (Jose P. Laurel Highway) in Lipa
- N656 (Santa Teresita–Alitagtag Diversion Road) in Santa Teresita and Alitagtag
- West end: N436 (Palico–Balayan–Batangas Road) at Alitagtag–San Luis boundary

Location
- Country: Philippines
- Provinces: Batangas
- Major cities: Lipa
- Towns: San Jose; Cuenca; Alitagtag; Santa Teresita; San Luis

Highway system
- Roads in the Philippines; Highways; Expressways; List
← N432	→ N434

National Route 433 (N433) or the Banaybanay–Mojon–Cuenca Road is a 17.180-kilometer (10.675 mi) secondary highway that forms part of the Philippine highway network. It is a two-to-four lane road serving as an important thoroughfare to settlements around the southern shore of Taal Lake and to the towns around Balayan Bay, connecting them to Batangas' largest settlement, Lipa.

The road is especially notorious due to seemingly unending roadworks, particularly the Lipa and San Jose segments, to the point that frequent motorists mentioned it as one of the worst roads in the country.

== Route description ==
The highway starts at Jose P. Laurel Highway in Barangay Banaybanay, Lipa City, briefly passing through the municipality of San Jose in Barangay Pinagtung-ulan and into the town of Cuenca, where the road turns windy while providing a scenic view of nearby Mount Maculot and into Cuenca town proper. The road then passes through Alitagtag municipality, through a major crossroad leading to San Jose town proper, San Pascual and Bauan, then heads toward Alitagtag town proper, then takes a sharp turn at the border with the town of Santa Teresita and terminates at the Muzon Junction, its intersection with Palico–Balayan–Batangas Road at the municipal boundary of Alitagtag and San Luis.

== History ==
The road previously ran between Highway 17 (now Palico–Balayan–Batangas Road) and Cuenca poblacion. It was later extended towards Lipa, Batangas before 1945 and was also known as the Banay-Banay–Mojon Junction Road.

== Intersections ==
The entire route is located in Batangas. Intersections are numbered by kilometer posts, with Rizal Park in Manila designated as kilometer zero.

City/Municipality	km	mi	Destinations	Notes
Lipa			N4 (Jose P. Laurel Highway) – Manila, Tanauan, Santo Tomas	Banaybanay Crossing. Northbound goes to Lipa city proper, Tanauan & Metro Manila; southbound goes to San Jose town proper, Ibaan and Batangas City.
San Jose			Pinagtung-ulan–Galamay-Amo–Taysan Road	Leads to N4 (Jose P. Laurel Highway) in Brgy. Taysan, San Jose.
San Jose			Palanca–Balagtasin–Pinagtung-ulan Road	Leads to Makalintal Avenue in Brgy. Palanca, San Jose.
Cuenca			Labac Road	Leads to Brgy. Sabang & Bagong Pook in San Jose.
Cuenca			B. Laqui Street / Cuenca–Natunuan Road — Batangas City	Road leading to Balagtas Rotunda and Batangas City–San Pascual–Bauan Diversion Road.
Alitagtag			Pinagkurusan–Dalipit–Bungahan Road / Bauan–Alitagtag Road — San Jose, San Pascual, Bauan	The former road leads to Makalintal Avenue in Brgy. Lalayat, San Jose; the latter road leads to Bauan town proper.
Alitagtag–Santa Teresita boundary			N656 (Santa Teresita–Alitagtag Diversion Road) – Taal, Lemery, Balayan	Diversion road bypassing Muzon junction.
San Luis–Alitagtag boundary			N436 (Palico–Balayan–Batangas Road) – Bauan, Batangas City, Taal	Route terminus at Muzon junction. Northwest-bound goes to Taal, Lemery, Calaca, and nearby towns; southeast-bound goes to Batangas City, Mabini, and Bauan.
1.000 mi = 1.609 km; 1.000 km = 0.621 mi
