= Muzon =

Muzon is the name of several barangays in Luzon, Philippines.

- Muzon, Malabon
- Muzon, Naic, Cavite
- Muzon, San Jose del Monte, Bulacan
- Muzon, San Juan, Batangas
- Muzon, San Luis, Batangas
- Muzon, Taytay, Rizal
- Muzon I, Rosario, Cavite
- Muzon II, Rosario, Cavite
- Muzon Primero, Alitagtag, Batangas
- Muzon Segundo, Alitagtag, Batangas
