= Diokno Highway =

Secondary national road in Batangas, Philippines

Diokno Highway
- Payapa Road; Tagaytay-Junction–Calaca-Lemery Road

Route information
- Maintained by Department of Public Works and Highways - Batangas 1st District Engineering Office
- Length: 20.064 km (12.467 mi)
- Existed: 1945–present
- Component highways: N410

Major junctions
- North end: N410 / N407 (Tagaytay–Nasugbu Highway) at Calaca–Alfonso boundary
- South end: N436 (Palico–Balayan–Batangas Road) in Lemery, Batangas

Location
- Country: Philippines
- Provinces: Batangas, Cavite
- Major cities: Calaca
- Towns: Alfonso, Laurel, Lemery

Highway system
- Roads in the Philippines; Highways; Expressways; List

The Diokno Highway, also known as Ramón Diokno Highway, Payapa Road and formerly as Tagaytay-Junction–Calaca-Lemery Road, is a 20.064-kilometer (12.467 mi), two-lane, secondary road in Batangas that connects the city of Calaca, near its border with Nasugbu and Alfonso, Cavite, and the municipality of Lemery. It connects southern Cavite and Batangas.

The highway is named after Ramón Diokno, a native of Taal, Batangas who served as a representative for Batangas, senator and Supreme Court associate justice.

== Route description ==
Diokno Highway starts at the Dayap Junction, its intersection with Tagaytay–Nasugbu Road at the provincial boundary of Cavite and Batangas. Starting from near the foot of Mount Batulao, it partially delineates the boundaries of the municipalities of Alfonso and Laurel and the city of Calaca. The road winds through the mountainous terrain on the western edge of the Taal Volcano Natural Park, traversing especially Payapa Ilaya and Payapa Ibaba, barangays in Lemery to where its alternate name, Payapa Road, apparently derived its name from. It terminates at Palico–Balayan–Batangas Road in Lemery at the south.

== History ==
The origin of the highway could be traced back to 1945, when the US Army Corps of Engineers built a “dusty, twisting, narrow” road between Mount Batulao and Lemery as the shorter route relative to Route 17, which connected Imus and Batangas via Palico in Tuy and includes the present-day Aguinaldo Highway, Tagaytay–Nasugbu Road and Palico–Balayan–Batangas Road. According to Major Edward M. Flanagan Jr. in his 1948 book, this road was called the Shorty Ridge Road, which likely refers the present-day Diokno Highway.

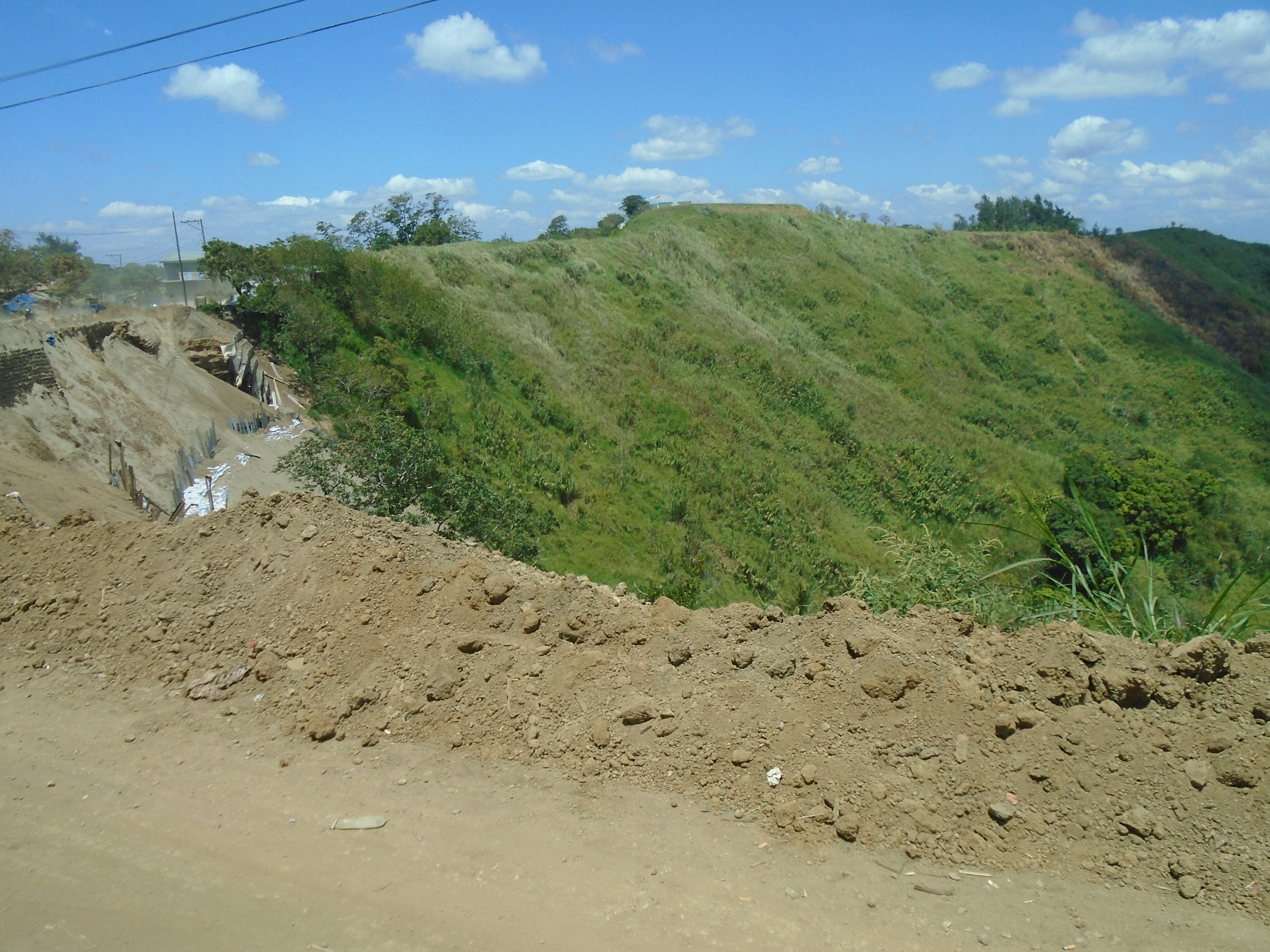
Portion of Diokno Highway in 2016, affected by a landslide caused by Typhoon Melor

A portion of the highway was affected by a landslide caused by Typhoon Melor (Nona) in December 2015; fortunately, the entire stretch was open to traffic as of December 17. In August 2016, a 100-meter (330 ft) section of the highway in Calaca was closed to traffic due to road slip and collapsed slope protection following the continuous heavy rains in the area. As a result, the Diokno Bridge was reconstructed beginning in the first quarter of 2017. The reconstructed bridge was inaugurated on November 13, 2018. The highway was also affected by the January 2020 Taal Volcano eruption, resulting to poor visibility on the highway and damage worth ₱41.62 million.
