= Alitagtag =

Municipality in Batangas, Philippines

- Municipality
- Municipality of Alitagtag
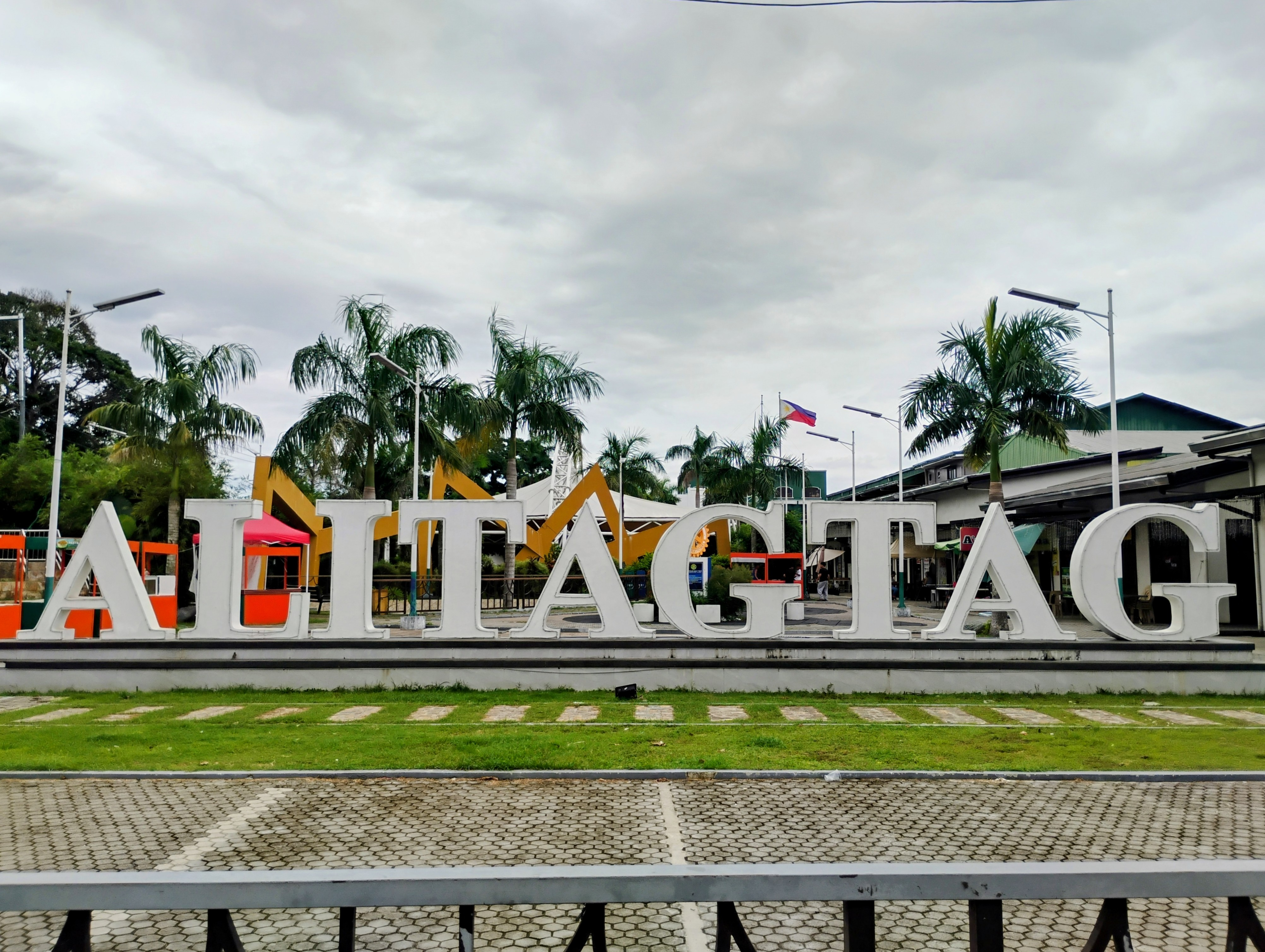
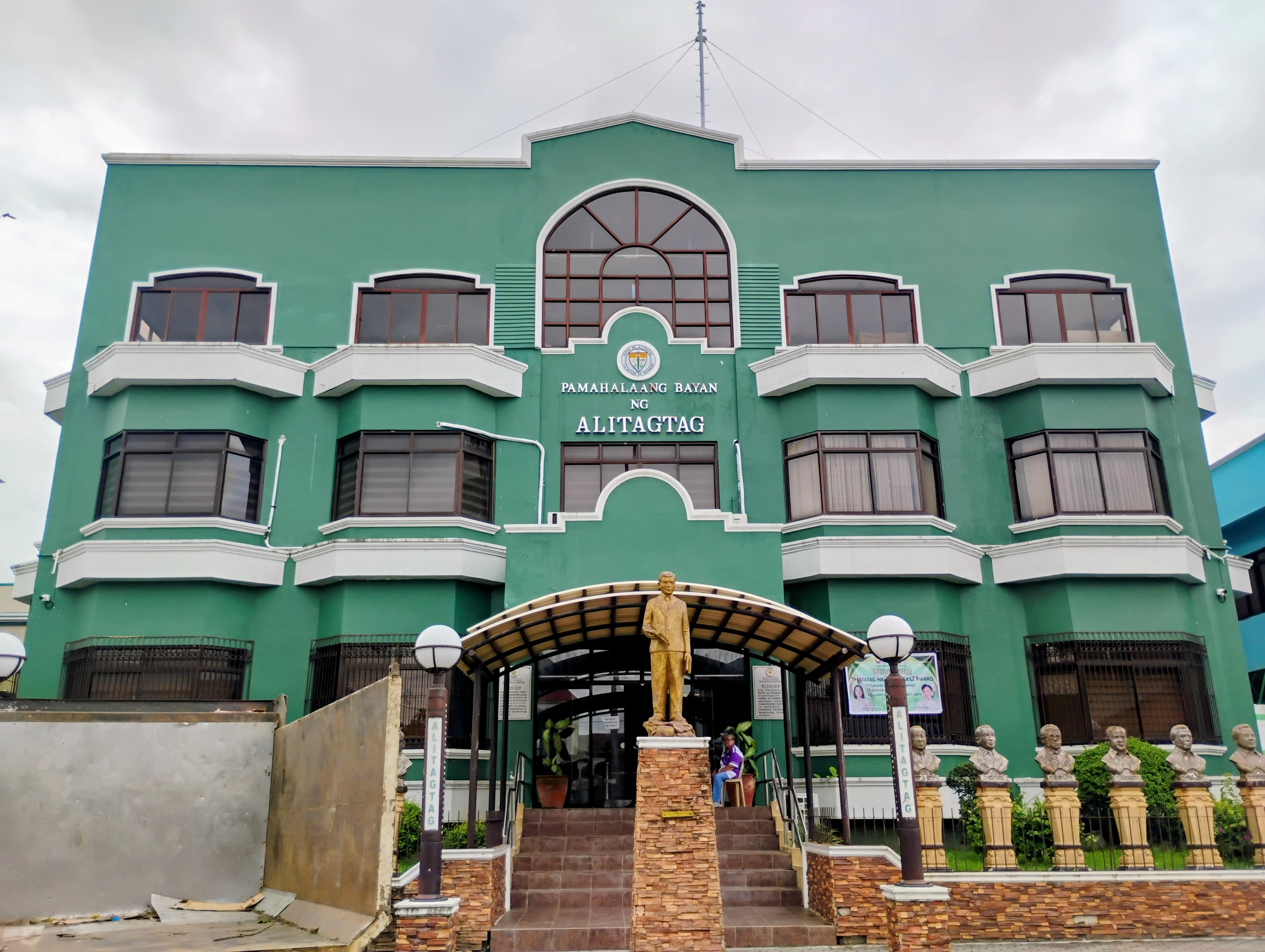
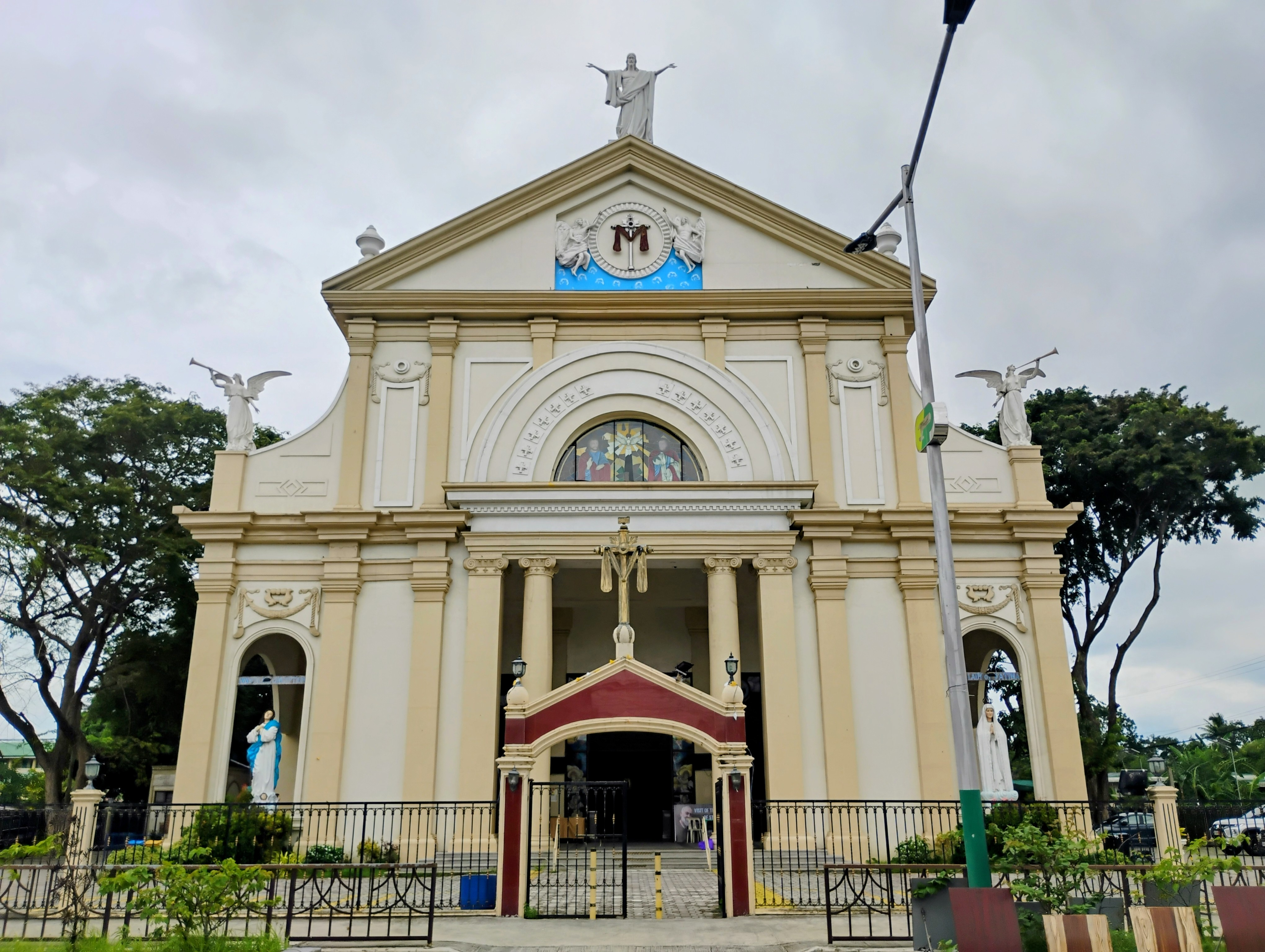
- Alitagtag Park Alitagtag Municipal Hall Invencion de la Santa Cruz Parish Church

- Seal

- Map of Batangas with Alitagtag highlighted
- Interactive map of Alitagtag
- Location within the Philippines
- Coordinates: 13°51′54″N 121°00′23″E
- Country: Philippines
- Region: Calabarzon
- Province: Batangas
- District: 3rd district
- Founded: January 1, 1910
- Barangays: 19 (see Barangays)

Government
  - Type: Sangguniang Bayan
  - Mayor: Jo-Ann B. Ponggos
  - Vice Mayor: Manuel E. Abrigo
  - Representative: King George Leandro Antonio V. Collantes
  - Municipal Council: Members: Reynaldo I. Rosales; Ambrosio S. Sandoval; Archie P. Catapang; Frederick M. Salazar; Paul Joshua T. Alcaraz; Vladimir Riccardo C. Macalintal; Dionisio C. Gonzales; Ruben Ceferino I. Ilagan
  - Electorate: 19,249 voters (2025)

Area
  - Total: 24.76 km^{2} (9.56 sq mi)
- Elevation: 161 m (528 ft)
- Highest elevation: 875 m (2,871 ft)
- Lowest elevation: 5 m (16 ft)

Population (2024 census)
  - Total: 28,033
  - Density: 1,132/km^{2} (2,932/sq mi)
  - Households: 6,873

Economy
  - Income class: 4th municipal income class
  - Poverty incidence: 7.85% (2023)
  - Revenue: ₱ 538.1 million (2024)
  - Assets: ₱ 427.4 million (2024)
  - Expenditure: ₱ 53.82 million (2024)
  - Liabilities: ₱ 159.7 million (2024)

Service provider
  - Electricity: Batangas 2 Electric Cooperative (BATELEC 2)
- Time zone: UTC+8 (PST)
- ZIP code: 4205
- PSGC: 0401002000
- IDD : area code: +63 (0)43
- Native languages: Tagalog

Alitagtag, officially the Municipality of Alitagtag (Tagalog: Bayan ng Alitagtag), is a municipality in the province of Batangas, Philippines. According to the 2024 census, it has a population of 28,033 people.

== Etymology ==
Alitagtag derived its name from the Tagalog word alinagnag, which means "a small distinct light."

== History ==
Much of Alitagtag was once part of Bauan. On August 10, 1908, the resolution by the electorate of barrios Alitagtag, Balagbag, Dalipit, Munlawin, and Muzon was transmitted to the Provincial Committee, who would approve it in three months' time. Batangas Governor Galicano Apacible later endorsed it to the Civil Commission for a hearing that would be held on January 2, 1909.

The aforementioned barrios were separated from Bauan to constitute the new independent municipality of Alitagtag by virtue of Executive Order No. 43 dated May 7, 1909. The order took effect on January 1, 1910.

In 1957, the following barrios were created: Pingas, composed of sitios Pingas and Corral; Tadlak, composed of sitios Tadlak and Malukan; and Sambi, composed of the sitio Sambi.

== Geography ==
According to the Philippine Statistics Authority, the municipality has a land area of 24.76 square kilometers (9.56 sq mi) constituting 0.79% of the 3,119.75-square-kilometer (1,204.54 sq mi) total area of Batangas.

It is bordered on the north by Taal Lake, east by Cuenca and San Jose, west by Santa Teresita and San Luis, and south by Bauan and San Pascual.

=== Barangays ===
Alitagtag is politically subdivided into 19 barangays, as shown in the matrix below. Each barangay consists of puroks and some have sitios.

PSGC	Barangay	Population			±% p.a.	
		2024		2010		
041002001	Balagbag	3.1%	861	650	▴	1.97%
041002002	Concepcion	2.2%	618	463	▴	2.02%
041002003	Concordia	3.3%	932	852	▴	0.62%
041002004	Dalipit East	4.3%	1,192	1,134	▴	0.35%
041002005	Dalipit West	3.3%	931	965	▾	−0.25%
041002006	Dominador East	5.1%	1,417	928	▴	2.98%
041002007	Dominador West	4.0%	1,131	1,069	▴	0.39%
041002008	Munlawin	5.0%	1,394	1,142	▴	1.39%
041002009	Muzon Primero	9.0%	2,524	2,167	▴	1.06%
041002010	Muzon Segundo	8.2%	2,294	2,119	▴	0.55%
041002011	Pinagkurusan	4.1%	1,148	1,311	▾	−0.92%
041002012	Ping-As	5.7%	1,595	1,215	▴	1.91%
041002013	Poblacion East	5.2%	1,456	1,297	▴	0.81%
041002014	Poblacion West	9.3%	2,595	2,304	▴	0.83%
041002015	Salvador Agito	2.8%	785	619	▴	1.66%
041002016	San Jose	8.7%	2,441	2,225	▴	0.64%
041002017	San Juan	2.7%	761	637	▴	1.24%
041002018	Santa Cruz	4.8%	1,351	1,286	▴	0.34%
041002019	Tadlac	5.0%	1,393	1,266	▴	0.67%
	Total		28,033	23,649	▴	1.19%

=== Climate ===
Climate data for Alitagtag, Batangas
Month	Jan	Feb	Mar	Apr	May	Jun	Jul	Aug	Sep	Oct	Nov	Dec	Year
Mean daily maximum °C (°F)	27 (81)	29 (84)	30 (86)	32 (90)	30 (86)	29 (84)	28 (82)	27 (81)	27 (81)	28 (82)	28 (82)	27 (81)	29 (83)
Mean daily minimum °C (°F)	19 (66)	18 (64)	19 (66)	21 (70)	23 (73)	23 (73)	23 (73)	23 (73)	23 (73)	22 (72)	20 (68)	19 (66)	21 (70)
Average precipitation mm (inches)	11 (0.4)	13 (0.5)	14 (0.6)	32 (1.3)	101 (4.0)	142 (5.6)	208 (8.2)	187 (7.4)	175 (6.9)	131 (5.2)	68 (2.7)	39 (1.5)	1,121 (44.3)
Average rainy days	5.2	5.0	7.4	11.5	19.8	23.5	27.0	25.9	25.2	23.2	15.5	8.3	197.5
Source: Meteoblue (Use with caution: this is modeled/calculated data, not measured locally.)

== Demographics ==
Population census of Alitagtag
Year	Pop.	±% p.a.
1918	6,978	—
1939	8,067	+0.69%
1948	9,597	+1.95%
1960	9,967	+0.32%
1970	12,822	+2.55%
1975	12,243	−0.92%
1980	14,500	+3.44%
1990	16,016	+1.00%
1995	18,639	+2.88%
2000	20,192	+1.73%
2007	22,794	+1.69%
2010	23,649	+1.35%
2015	25,300	+1.29%
2020	26,819	+1.23%
2024	28,033	+1.07%
Source: Philippine Statistics Authority

In the 2024 census, Alitagtag had a population of 28,033 people. The population density was 1,100 inhabitants per square kilometer (2,800/sq mi).

== Economy ==
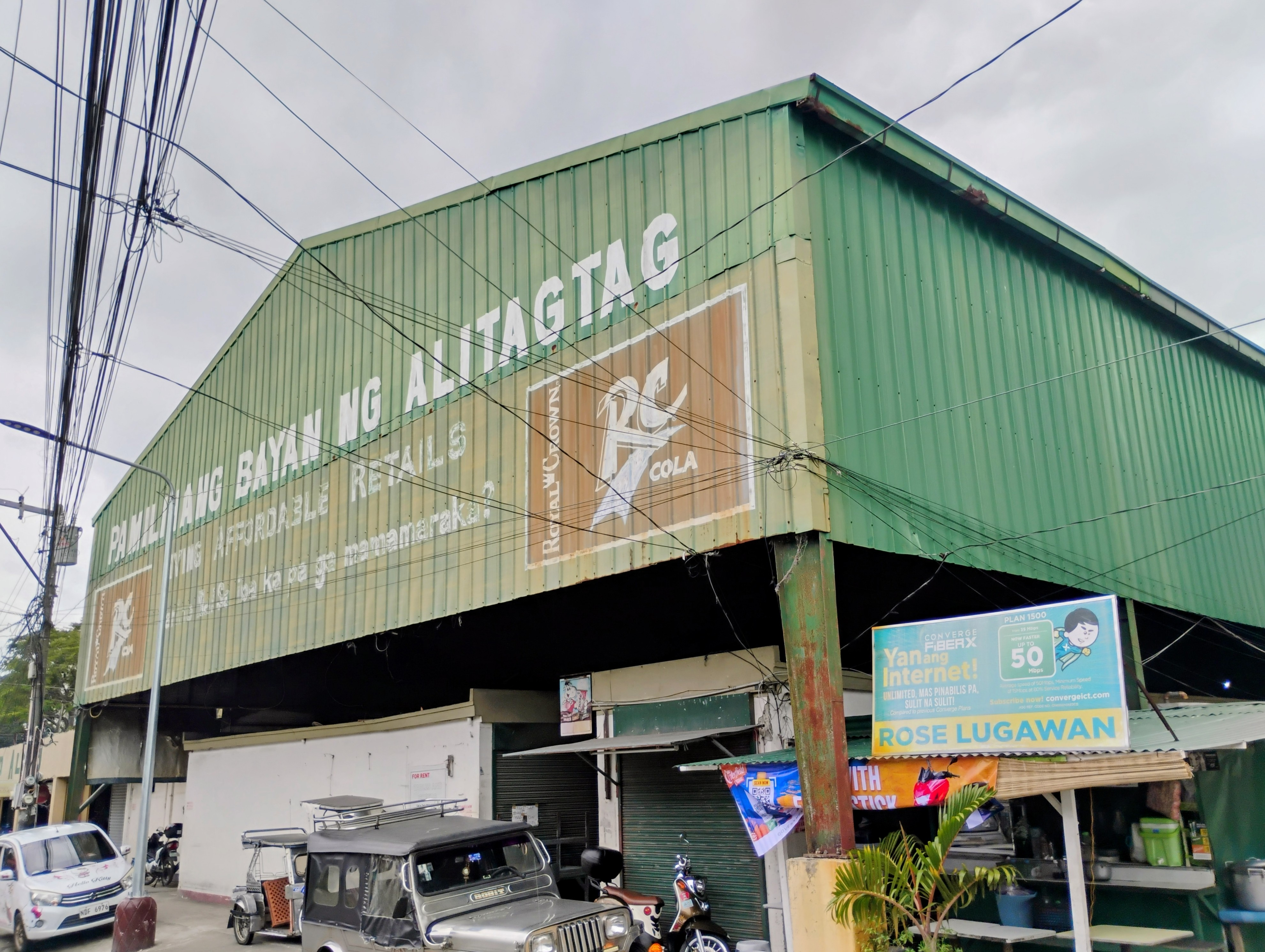
Alitagtag Public Market

Poverty incidence of Alitagtag (%)

Source: Philippine Statistics Authority

== Culture ==
The town is notable for being the original location where a replica of the True Cross was erected in the early Spanish colonial period. Known as the Holy Cross of Alitagtag or Mahal na Poong Santa Cruz, the image which was supposedly hewn from the post of a fallen house made of anubing hardwood, is venerated in surrounding towns for its reputedly auspicious powers.

The sublî dance, now popular throughout the province and beyond, is the most widely recognised ritual associated with the Catholic devotion to the Holy Cross of Alitagtag.

== Education ==
The Alitagtag Schools District Office governs all educational institutions within the municipality. It oversees the management and operations of all private and public, from primary to secondary schools.

=== Primary and elementary schools ===
- Alitagtag Central School
- Dalipit Elementary School
- Munlawin Elementary School
- Muzon Elementary School
- Pinagkurusan Elementary School
- Ping-as Coral Elementary School
- San Jose T. Reyes Elementary School
- Tadlac Elementary School

=== Secondary schools ===
- Alitagtag College (High School)
- Alitagtag National High School
- Alitagtag Senior High School

=== Higher educational institution ===
- Alitagtag College
- St. Bridget College Alitagtag

== Gallery ==
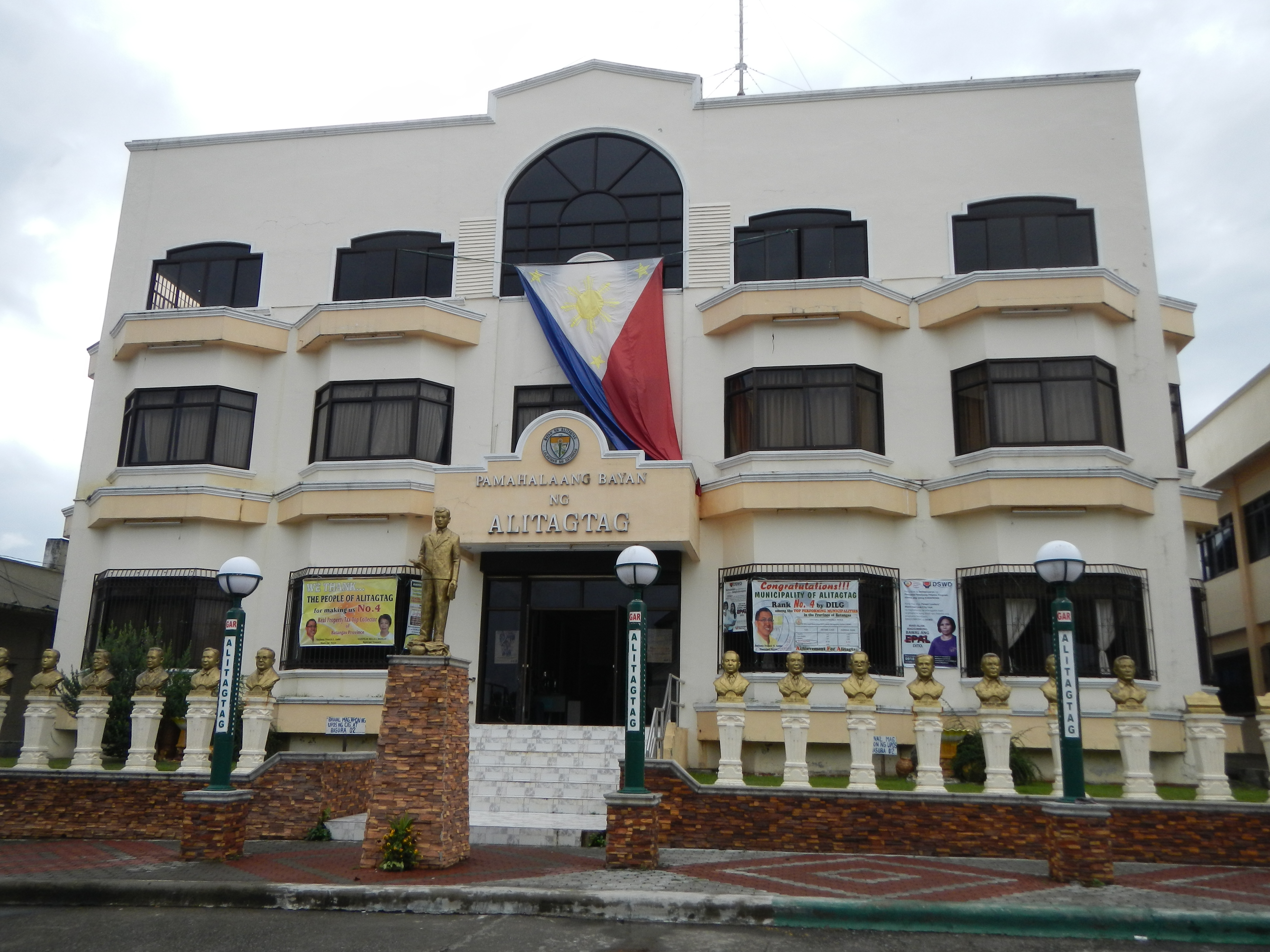
Municipal hall

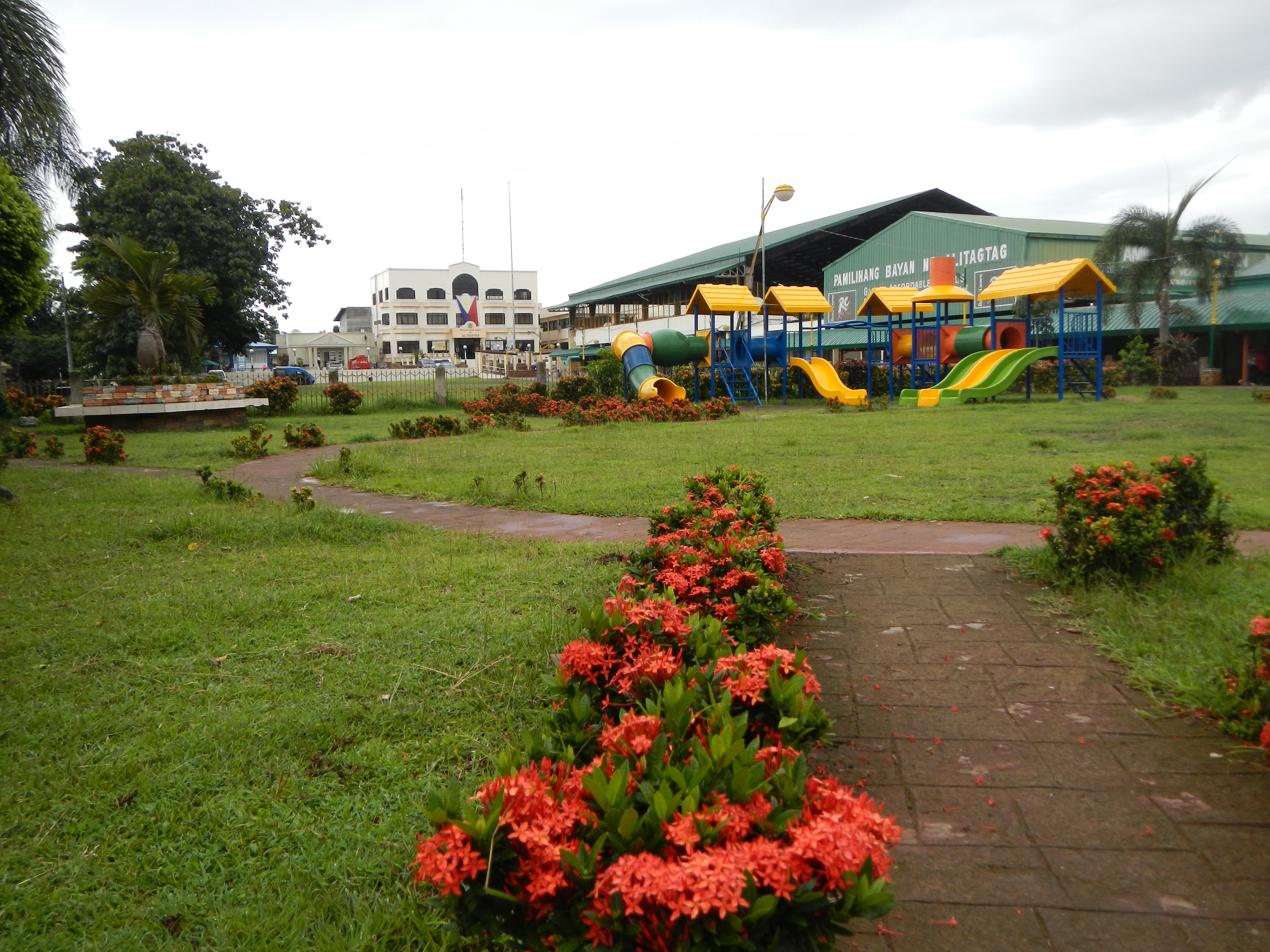
Park

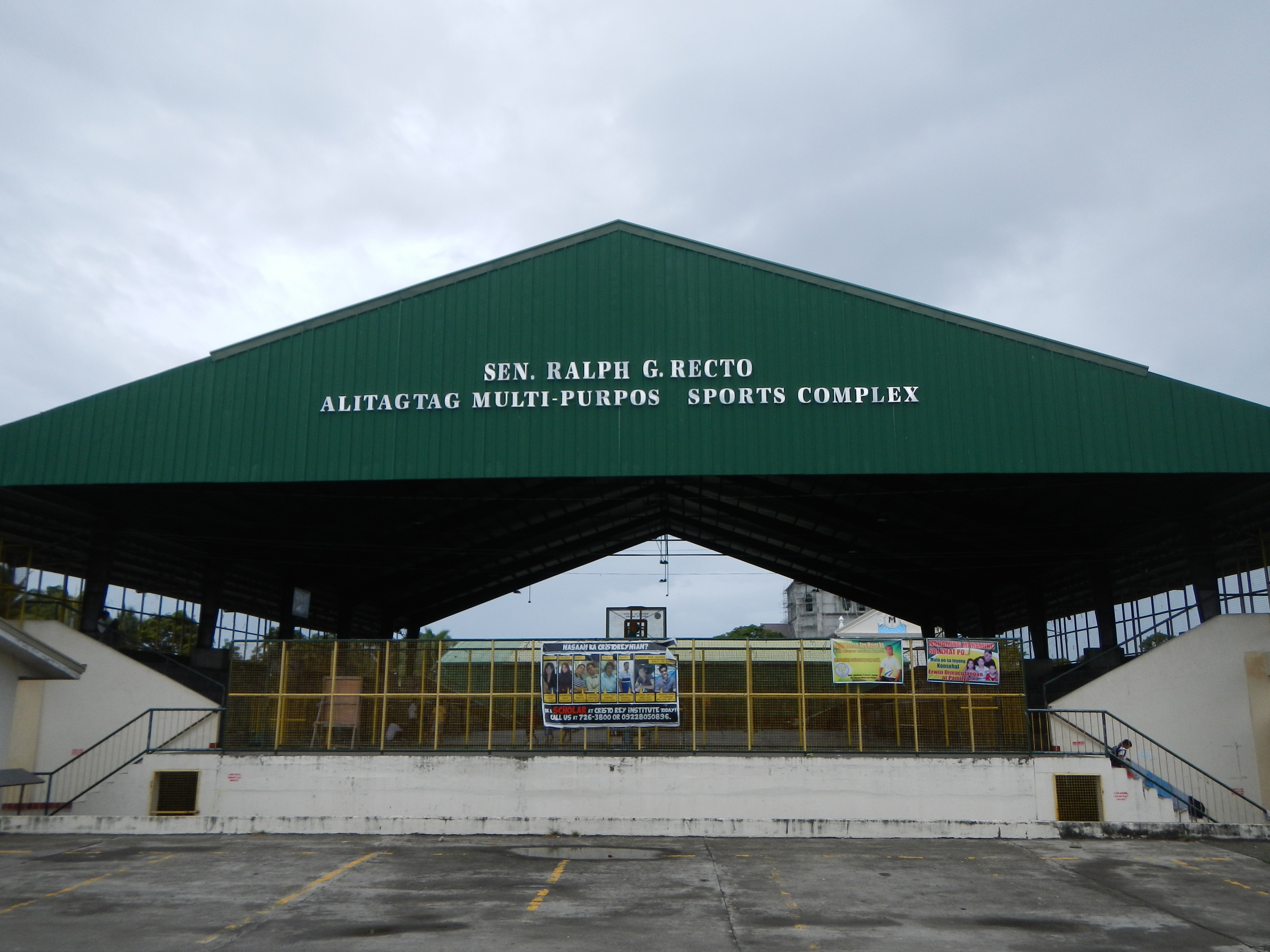
Multipurpose sports complex

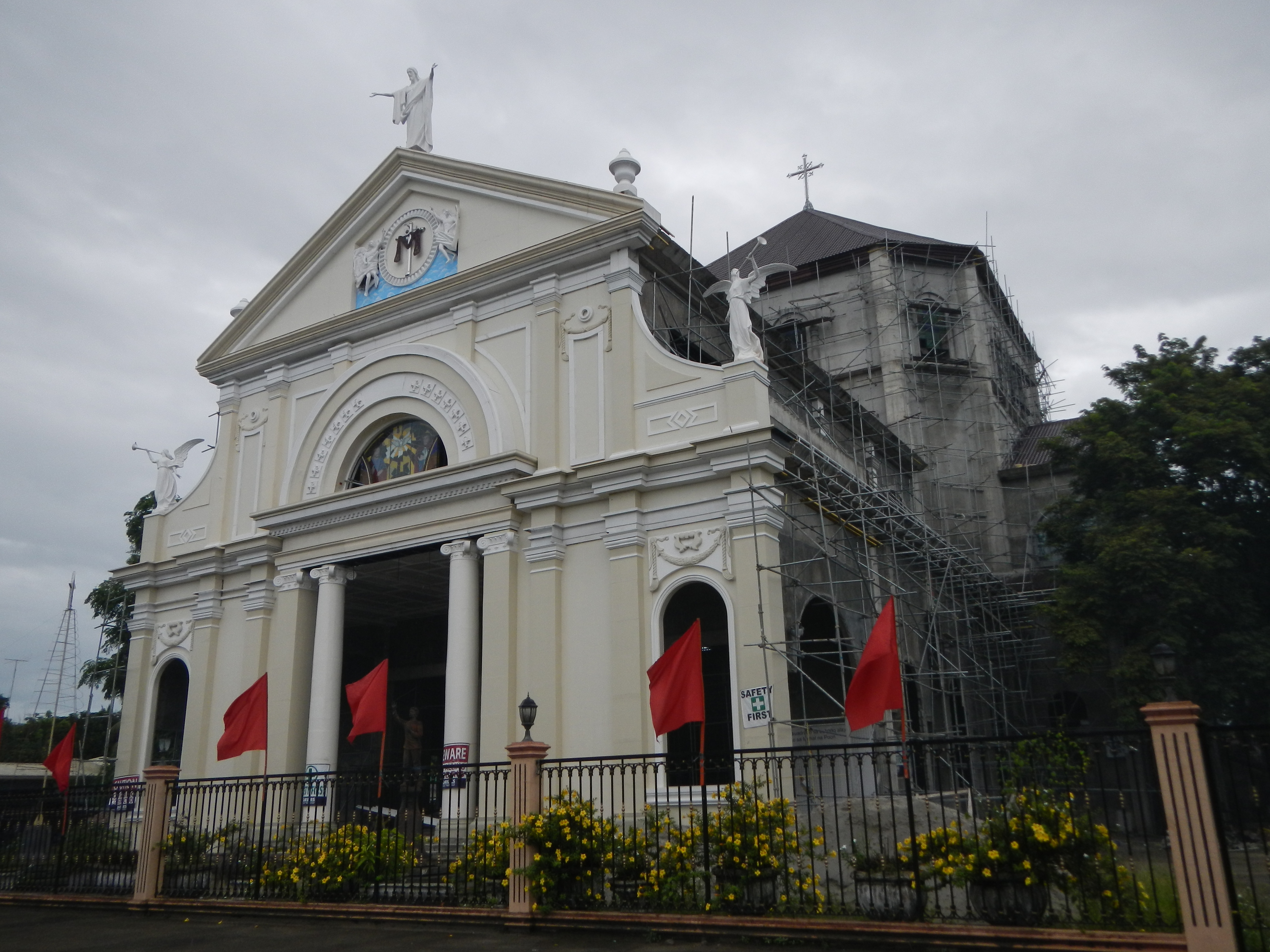
Invencion de la Santa Cruz Parish Church
