= Santa Teresita, Batangas =

Municipality in Batangas, Philippines

Santa Teresita
- Municipality
- Municipality of Santa Teresita
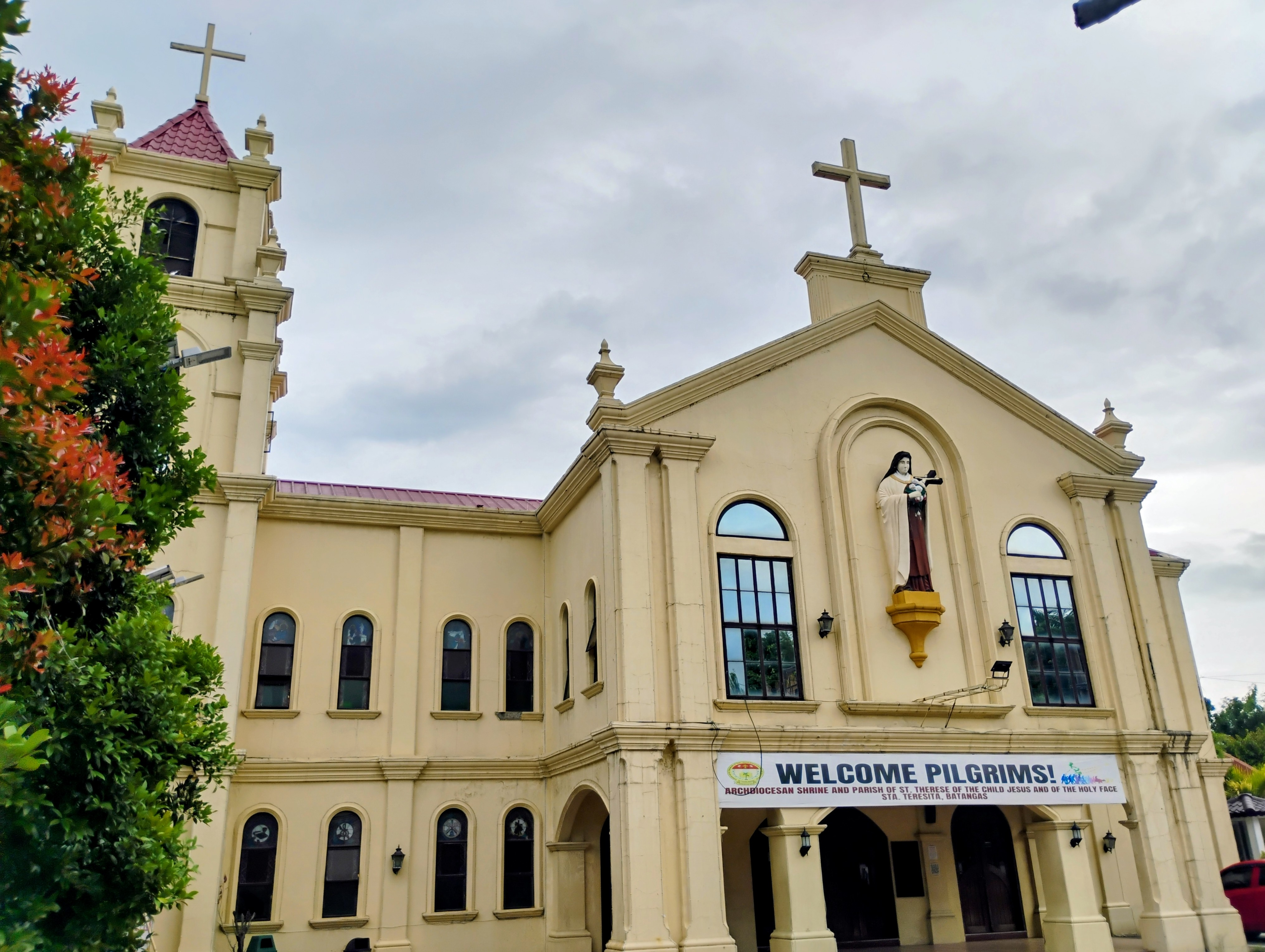
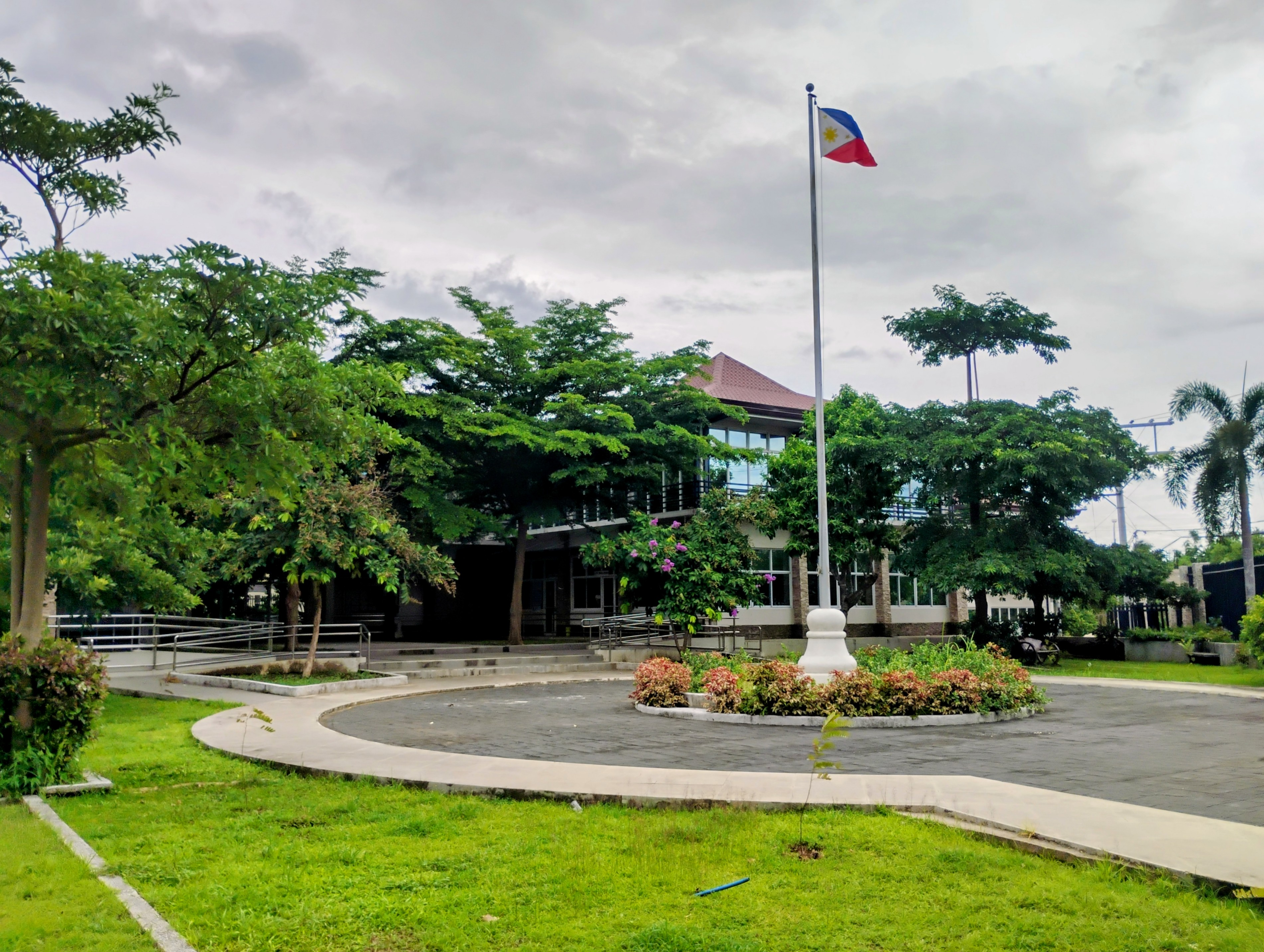
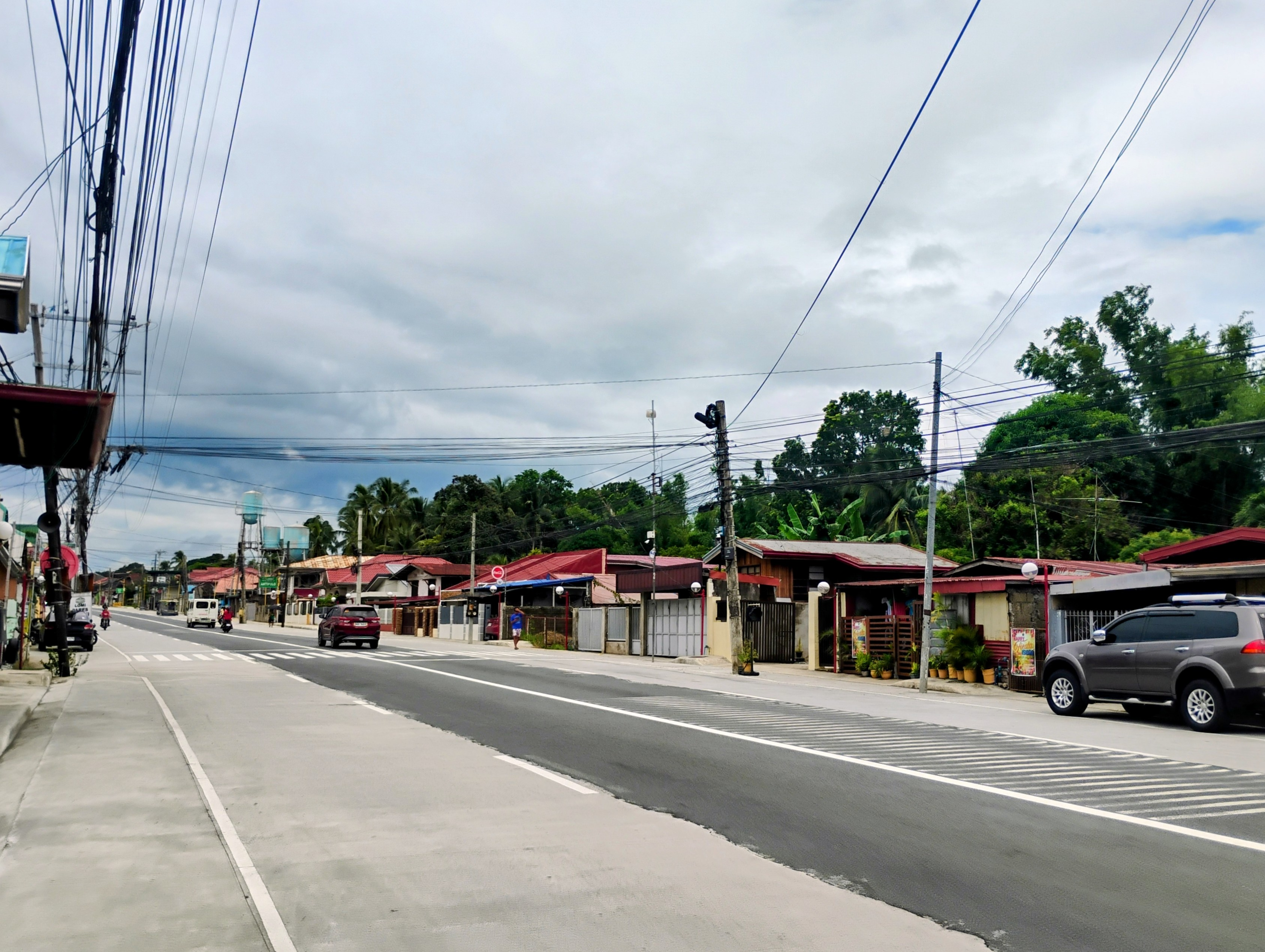
- Archdiocesan Shrine of Saint Therese of the Child Jesus and the Holy Face of Santa Teresita Santa Teresita Municipal Hall Palico-Balayan-Batangas Road along Santa Teresita

- Seal

- Map of Batangas with Santa Teresita highlighted
- Interactive map of Santa Teresita
- Location within the Philippines
- Coordinates: 13°51′59″N 120°58′53″E
- Country: Philippines
- Region: Calabarzon
- Province: Batangas
- District: 3rd district
- Founded: December 28, 1961
- Named for: Thérèse of Lisieux
- Barangays: 17 (see Barangays)

Government
  - Type: Sangguniang Bayan
  - Mayor: Norberto A. Segunial, Jr.
  - Vice Mayor: Maria Aurea V. Segunial
  - Representative: King George Leandro Antonio V. Collantes
  - Municipal Council: Members: Marius Ian C. Sangalang; Maria Ruth A. Sandoval; Charlito D. Arriola; Arnold B. Bathan; Analiza M. De Chavez; Bien A. Rodriguez; Ronilo B. Atienza; Daniel B. Cataquiz
  - Electorate: 14,295 voters (2025)

Area
  - Total: 16.30 km^{2} (6.29 sq mi)
- Elevation: 83 m (272 ft)
- Highest elevation: 234 m (768 ft)
- Lowest elevation: 5 m (16 ft)

Population (2024 census)
  - Total: 21,742
  - Density: 1,334/km^{2} (3,455/sq mi)
  - Households: 5,547

Economy
  - Income class: 4th municipal income class
  - Poverty incidence: 6.53% (2023)
  - Revenue: ₱ 138.7 million (2024)
  - Assets: ₱ 460.6 million (2024)
  - Expenditure: ₱ 46.78 million (2024)
  - Liabilities: ₱ 117.1 million (2024)

Service provider
  - Electricity: Batangas 1 Electric Cooperative (BATELEC 1)
- Time zone: UTC+8 (PST)
- ZIP code: 4206
- PSGC: 0401027000
- IDD : area code: +63 (0)43
- Native languages: Tagalog

Santa Teresita, officially the Municipality of Santa Teresita (Tagalog: Bayan ng Santa Teresita), is a municipality in the province of Batangas, Philippines. According to the 2024 census, it has a population of 21,742 people.

== Etymology ==
Santa Teresita is derived from Spanish for its patron saint, Thérèse of Lisieux, who is also known as Saint Therese of the Child Jesus and the Holy Face.

== History ==
On December 28, 1961, the barrios of Sambat, Sinipian, Bihis, Calayaan, Irukan and Cutang Cawayan from the municipality of Taal; Calumala, Tambo, Saimsim and Burol from the municipality of San Nicolas; and Pacifico and Sampa from the municipality of San Luis were separated and constituted into a new and separate municipality known as Santa Teresita, by virtue of Executive Order No. 454 signed by President Carlos P. Garcia.

Ireneo Aquino was appointed as its first municipal mayor, serving until June 1962. In 1971, barangay Antipolo was established as a separate barangay out of barangay Sinipian, as well as barangay Cuta East, which was separated from barangay Cutang Cawayan.

== Geography ==
Santa Teresita is located at 13°51′59″N 120°58′53″E along the southern lakeshore area of Taal Lake. Its boundaries are San Nicolas in the north, San Luis on the south, Taal on the west and Taal Lake on the northeast.

According to the Philippine Statistics Authority, the municipality has a land area of 16.30 square kilometers (6.29 sq mi) constituting 0.52% of the 3,119.75-square-kilometer (1,204.54 sq mi) total area of Batangas.

Santa Teresita is 17 kilometers (11 mi) from Batangas City and 122 kilometers (76 mi) from Manila.

=== Barangays ===
Santa Teresita is politically subdivided into 17 barangays, as shown in the matrix below. Each barangay consists of puroks and some have sitios.

Currently, there are 3 barangays which are classified as urban.

PSGC	Barangay	Population			±% p.a.	
		2024		2010		
041027001	Antipolo	3.5%	768	696	▴	0.68%
041027002	Bihis	7.3%	1,584	1,373	▴	1.00%
041027003	Burol	3.1%	667	454	▴	2.70%
041027004	Calayaan	9.5%	2,060	1,902	▴	0.55%
041027005	Calumala	6.2%	1,346	1,289	▴	0.30%
041027006	Cuta East	5.5%	1,185	991	▴	1.25%
041027007	Cutang Cawayan	3.4%	733	510	▴	2.55%
041027008	Irukan	2.9%	637	598	▴	0.44%
041027009	Pacifico	8.9%	1,945	1,680	▴	1.02%
041027010	Poblacion I	7.6%	1,662	1,483	▴	0.79%
041027012	Saimsim	12.6%	2,730	1,910	▴	2.51%
041027013	Sampa	6.0%	1,295	1,172	▴	0.69%
041027014	Sinipian	4.1%	898	705	▴	1.69%
041027015	Tambo Ibaba	4.5%	976	683	▴	2.50%
041027016	Tambo Ilaya	4.2%	920	580	▴	3.25%
041027017	Poblacion II	5.4%	1,180	986	▴	1.25%
041027018	Poblacion III	2.5%	541	403	▴	2.06%
	Total		21,742	17,415	▴	1.55%

=== Climate ===
Climate data for Santa Teresita, Batangas
Month	Jan	Feb	Mar	Apr	May	Jun	Jul	Aug	Sep	Oct	Nov	Dec	Year
Mean daily maximum °C (°F)	28 (82)	29 (84)	30 (86)	32 (90)	31 (88)	29 (84)	28 (82)	28 (82)	28 (82)	28 (82)	28 (82)	28 (82)	29 (84)
Mean daily minimum °C (°F)	19 (66)	19 (66)	20 (68)	21 (70)	23 (73)	23 (73)	23 (73)	23 (73)	23 (73)	22 (72)	21 (70)	20 (68)	21 (70)
Average precipitation mm (inches)	11 (0.4)	13 (0.5)	14 (0.6)	32 (1.3)	101 (4.0)	142 (5.6)	208 (8.2)	187 (7.4)	175 (6.9)	131 (5.2)	68 (2.7)	39 (1.5)	1,121 (44.3)
Average rainy days	5.2	5.0	7.4	11.5	19.8	23.5	27.0	25.9	25.2	23.2	15.5	8.3	197.5
Source: Meteoblue

== Demographics ==
Population census of Santa Teresita
Year	Pop.	±% p.a.
1970	9,336	—
1975	10,087	+1.56%
1980	11,134	+1.99%
1990	12,005	+0.76%
1995	14,017	+2.95%
2000	14,074	+0.09%
2007	16,891	+2.55%
2010	17,415	+1.12%
2015	21,127	+3.75%
2020	21,559	+0.43%
2024	21,742	+0.20%
Source: Philippine Statistics Authority

In the 2024 census, Santa Teresita had a population of 21,742 people. The population density was 1,300 inhabitants per square kilometer or 3,400 inhabitants per square mile.

== Economy ==
Poverty incidence of Santa Teresita (%)

Source: Philippine Statistics Authority

== Education ==
The Santa Teresita Schools District Office governs all educational institutions within the municipality. It oversees the management and operations of all private and public, from primary to secondary schools.

=== Primary and elementary schools ===
- Burol Elementary School
- Calumala Elementary School
- Jorge M. Atienza Elementary School
- Irukan-Kalayaan Elementary School
- Mohon Elementary School
- Saimsim Elementary School
- Sta. Teresita Central School
- Tambo Elementary School

=== Secondary schools ===
- Sampa-Pacifico Integrated School
- St. Therese Catholic School Batangas
- Sta. Teresita National High School

== Gallery ==
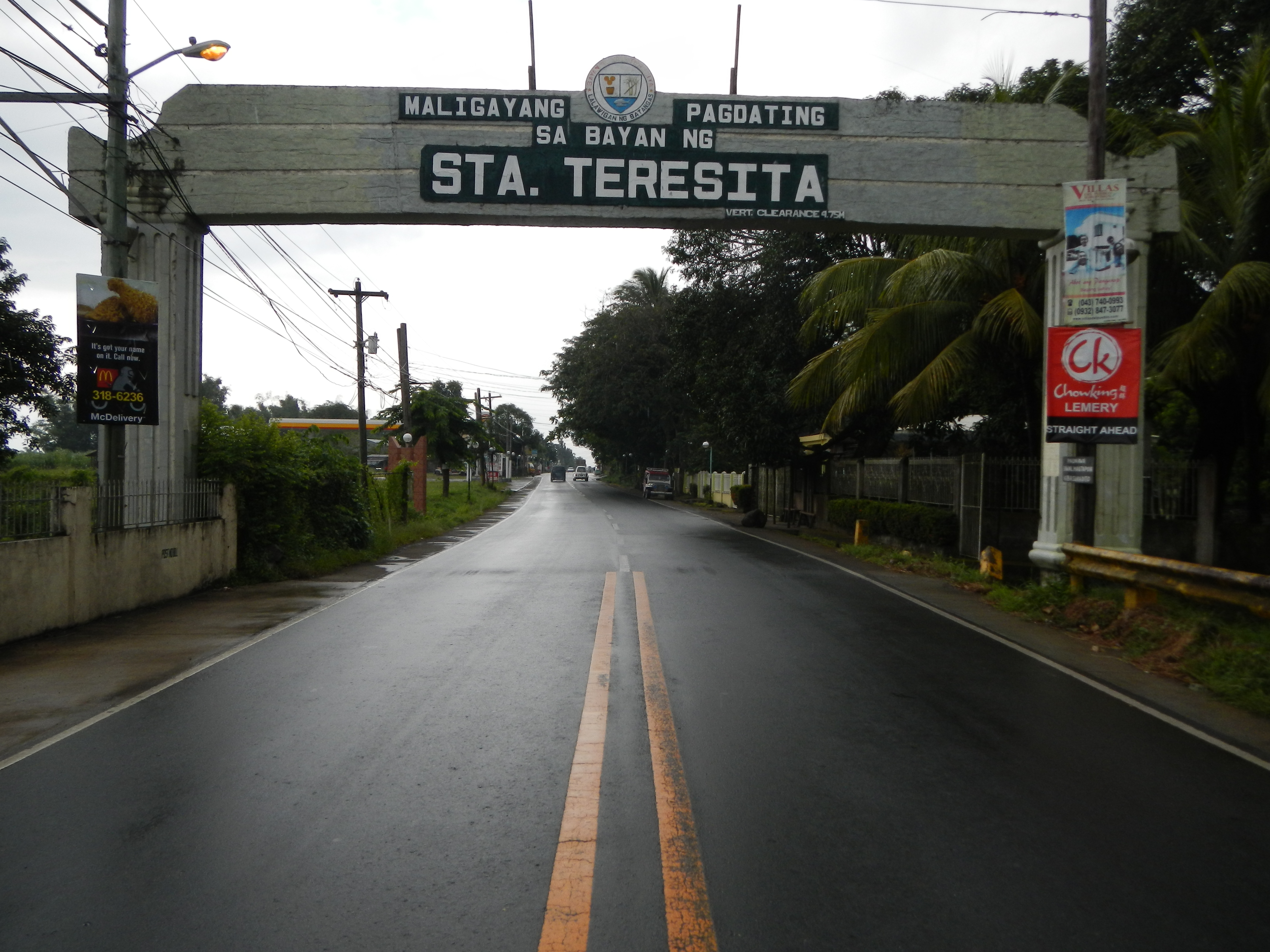
Welcome arch

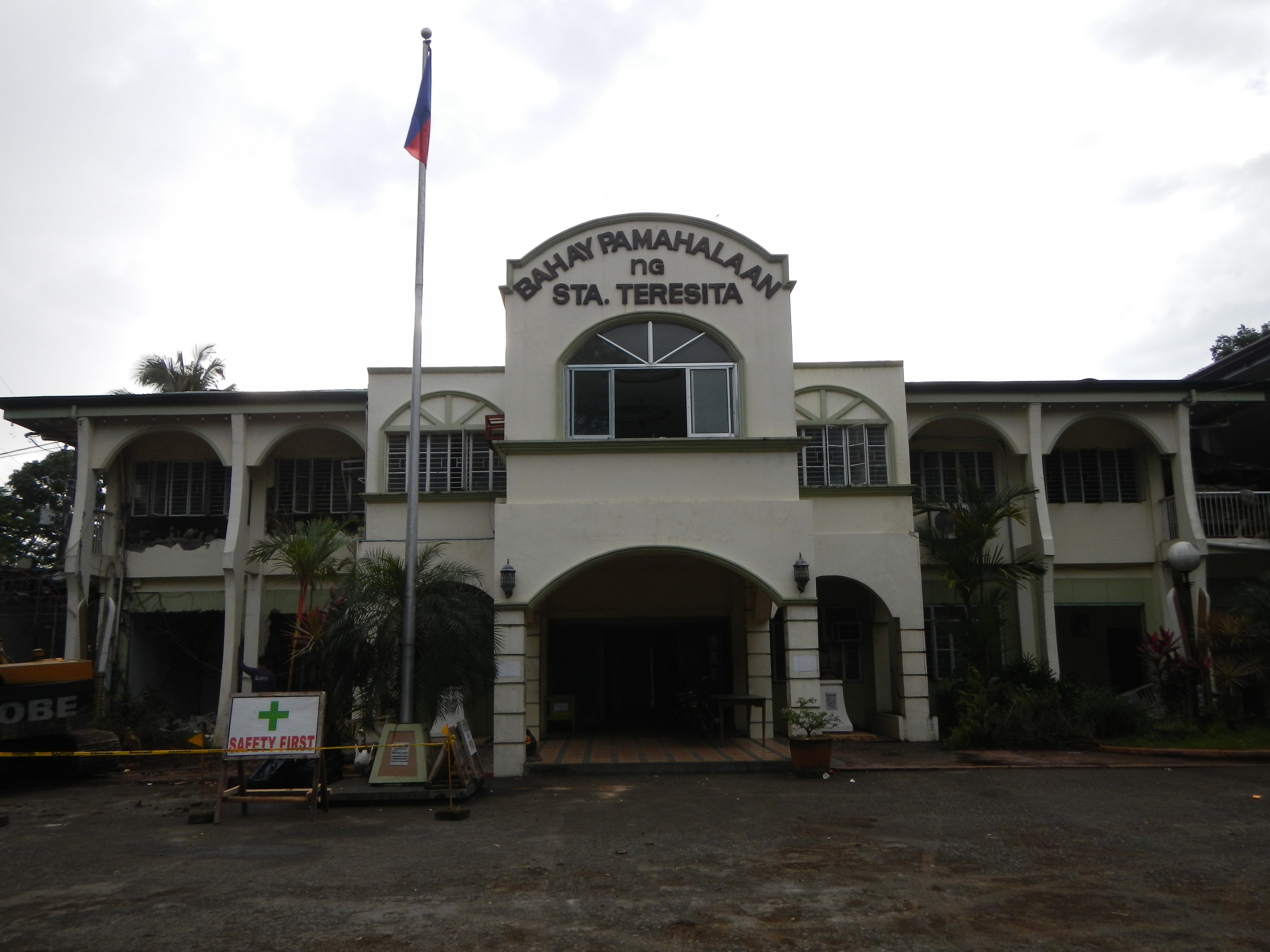
Old municipal hall

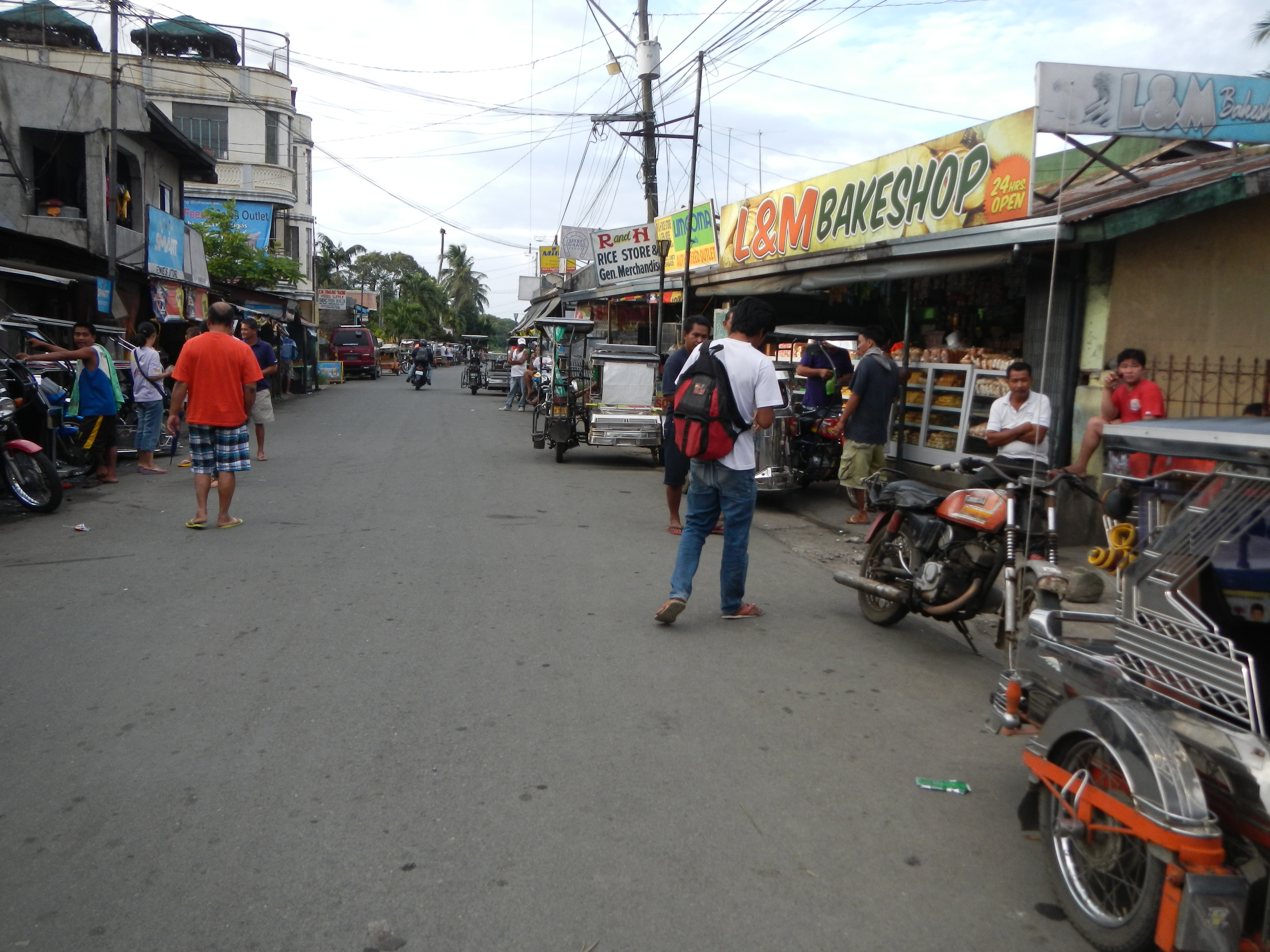
Downtown

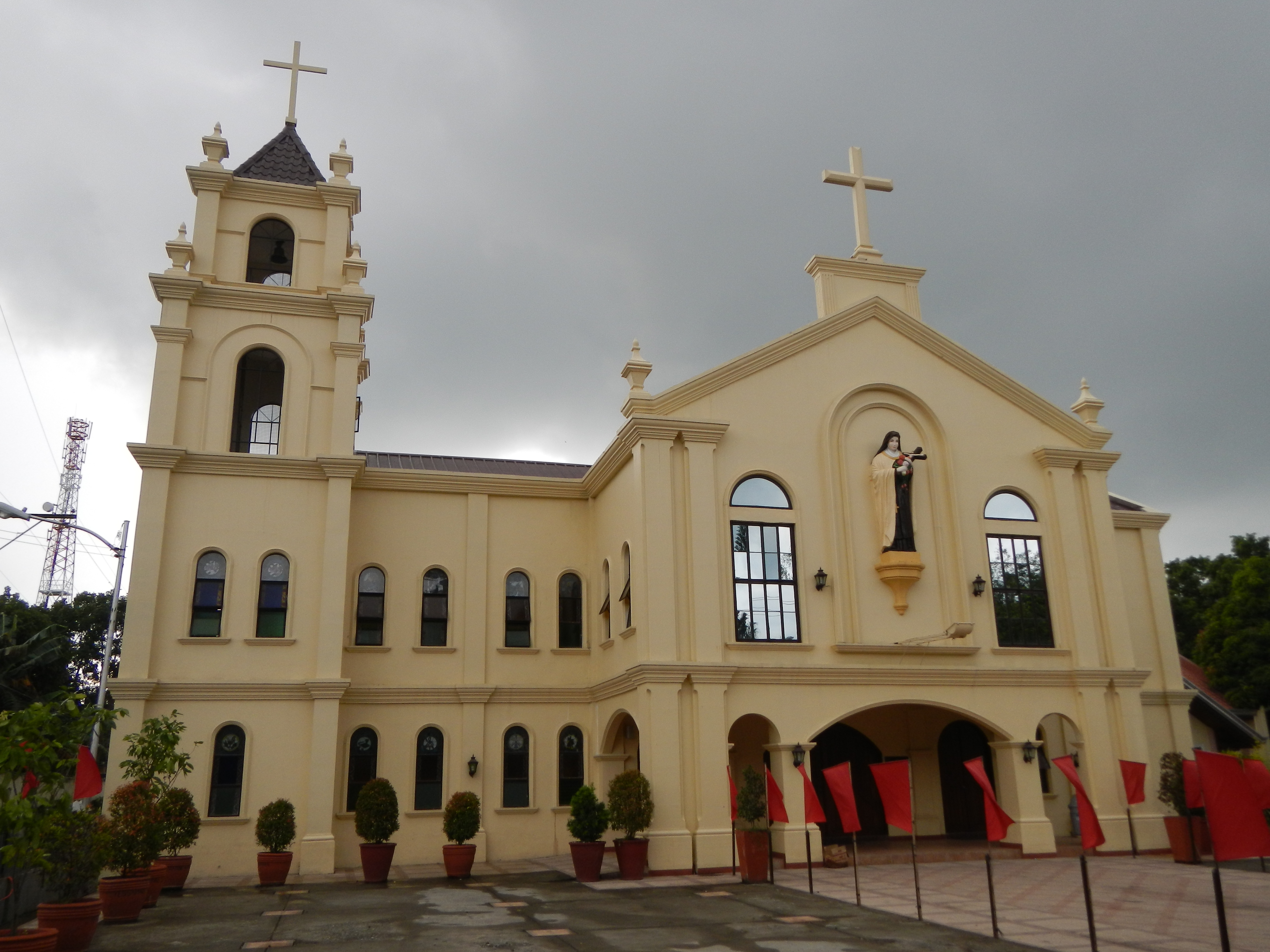
Archdiocesan Shrine of Saint Therese of the Child Jesus and of the Holy Face
