= San Luis, Batangas =

Municipality in Batangas, Philippines

San Luis Balibago
- Municipality
- Municipality of San Luis
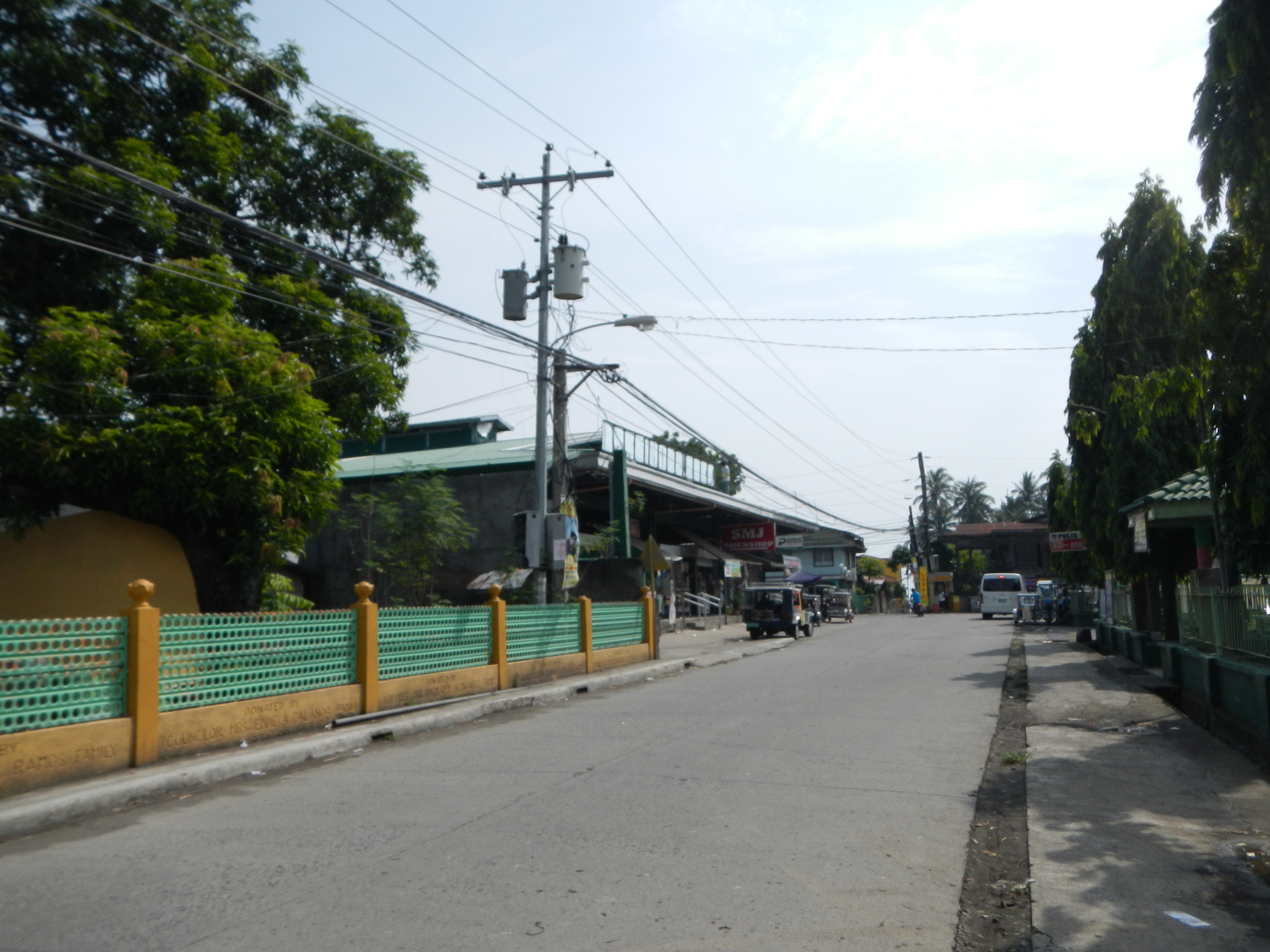
- Central school in San Luis

- Seal

- Map of Batangas with San Luis highlighted
- Interactive map of San Luis
- Location within the Philippines
- Coordinates: 13°50′N 120°56′E
- Country: Philippines
- Region: Calabarzon
- Province: Batangas
- District: 2nd district
- Founded: August 25, 1861
- Annexation to Taal: March 28, 1903
- Reestablishment: February 2, 1918
- Named for: Louis IX of France
- Barangays: 26 (see Barangays)

Government
  - Type: Sangguniang Bayan
  - Mayor: Oscarlito M. Hernandez
  - Vice Mayor: Ma-an M. de Gracia
  - Representative: Gerville R. Luistro
  - Municipal Council: Members: Edgardo Y. Pagkaliwagan; Rolan C. De Villa; Aisa Maritha R. Ocampo; Mildollarie M. Alvarez; John Paul G. De Villa; Adelio D. Bonsol; Lely Beth G. Vale; Reynato H. Patolot
  - Electorate: 26,877 voters (2025)

Area
  - Total: 42.56 km^{2} (16.43 sq mi)
- Elevation: 54 m (177 ft)
- Highest elevation: 339 m (1,112 ft)
- Lowest elevation: 0 m (0 ft)

Population (2024 census)
  - Total: 36,841
  - Density: 865.6/km^{2} (2,242/sq mi)
  - Households: 9,299

Economy
  - Income class: 3rd municipal income class
  - Poverty incidence: 6.57% (2023)
  - Revenue: ₱ 158.4 million (2024)
  - Assets: ₱ 375.9 million (2024)
  - Expenditure: ₱ 52.26 million (2024)
  - Liabilities: ₱ 30.07 million (2024)

Service provider
  - Electricity: Batangas 1 Electric Cooperative (BATELEC 1)
- Time zone: UTC+8 (PST)
- ZIP code: 4210
- PSGC: 0401024000
- IDD : area code: +63 (0)43
- Native languages: Tagalog

San Luis, officially the Municipality of San Luis (Tagalog: Bayan ng San Luis), is a municipality in the province of Batangas, Philippines. According to the 2024 census, it has a population of 36,841 people.

== Etymology ==
No reliable information could be gathered as to why the town is called San Luis. However, some people believe that it was named as such because it was established during the feast of Saint Louis.

== History ==
San Luis was historically part of Taal. It was established as an independent town on August 25, 1861. However, in 1903, due to small income, the town was made a part of Taal once again, with all the barrios in existence retaining their names, while the town center (poblacion) was reverted to its Spanish-era name Balibago. On February 2, 1918, San Luis was re-established.

In 1961, the barrios of Pacifico and Sampa were separated from San Luis and annexed to the new municipality of Santa Teresita.

== Geography ==
According to the Philippine Statistics Authority, the municipality has a land area of 42.56 square kilometers (16.43 sq mi), constituting 1.36% of the 3,119.75-square-kilometer (1,204.54 sq mi) total area of Batangas.

=== Barangays ===
San Luis is politically subdivided into 26 barangays, as shown in the matrix below. Each barangay consists of puroks and some have sitios.

| PSGC | Barangay | Population | | | ±% p.a. | |
| | | 2024 | | 2010 | | |
|---|---|---|---|---|---|---|
| 041024001 | Abiacao | 3.1% | 1,146 | 1,052 | ▴ | 0.59% |
| 041024002 | Bagong Tubig | 4.9% | 1,818 | 1,778 | ▴ | 0.15% |
| 041024003 | Balagtasin | 1.5% | 561 | 534 | ▴ | 0.34% |
| 041024004 | Balite | 2.7% | 997 | 942 | ▴ | 0.39% |
| 041024005 | Banoyo | 6.2% | 2,294 | 2,066 | ▴ | 0.72% |
| 041024006 | Boboy | 4.1% | 1,502 | 1,480 | ▴ | 0.10% |
| 041024007 | Bonliw | 3.1% | 1,145 | 1,002 | ▴ | 0.92% |
| 041024008 | Calumpang West | 3.2% | 1,186 | 1,081 | ▴ | 0.64% |
| 041024009 | Calumpang East | 4.0% | 1,464 | 1,430 | ▴ | 0.16% |
| 041024010 | Dulangan | 7.8% | 2,868 | 2,818 | ▴ | 0.12% |
| 041024011 | Durungao | 1.8% | 665 | 621 | ▴ | 0.47% |
| 041024012 | Locloc | 1.2% | 458 | 534 | ▾ | −1.05% |
| 041024013 | Luya | 3.3% | 1,229 | 1,063 | ▴ | 1.01% |
| 041024014 | Mahabang Parang | 2.0% | 734 | 602 | ▴ | 1.38% |
| 041024015 | Manggahan | 2.7% | 986 | 924 | ▴ | 0.45% |
| 041024016 | Muzon | 5.7% | 2,097 | 2,015 | ▴ | 0.28% |
| 041024019 | San Antonio | 1.8% | 656 | 624 | ▴ | 0.35% |
| 041024020 | San Isidro | 5.2% | 1,898 | 1,671 | ▴ | 0.88% |
| 041024021 | San Jose | 1.9% | 698 | 594 | ▴ | 1.12% |
| 041024022 | San Martin | 1.7% | 613 | 542 | ▴ | 0.85% |
| 041024023 | Santa Monica | 3.2% | 1,193 | 1,042 | ▴ | 0.94% |
| 041024024 | Taliba | 4.5% | 1,657 | 1,484 | ▴ | 0.76% |
| 041024025 | Talon | 3.4% | 1,238 | 1,124 | ▴ | 0.67% |
| 041024026 | Tejero | 3.4% | 1,258 | 1,068 | ▴ | 1.14% |
| 041024027 | Tungal | 1.5% | 558 | 487 | ▴ | 0.94% |
| 041024028 | Poblacion | 6.1% | 2,230 | 2,123 | ▴ | 0.34% |
| | Total | | 36,841 | 30,701 | ▴ | 1.26% |

=== Climate ===
Climate data for San Luis, Batangas
| Month | Jan | Feb | Mar | Apr | May | Jun | Jul | Aug | Sep | Oct | Nov | Dec | Year |
|---|---|---|---|---|---|---|---|---|---|---|---|---|---|
| Mean daily maximum °C (°F) | 29 (84) | 30 (86) | 31 (88) | 33 (91) | 32 (90) | 30 (86) | 29 (84) | 29 (84) | 29 (84) | 29 (84) | 29 (84) | 29 (84) | 30 (86) |
| Mean daily minimum °C (°F) | 20 (68) | 20 (68) | 21 (70) | 22 (72) | 24 (75) | 24 (75) | 24 (75) | 24 (75) | 24 (75) | 23 (73) | 22 (72) | 21 (70) | 22 (72) |
| Average precipitation mm (inches) | 11 (0.4) | 13 (0.5) | 14 (0.6) | 32 (1.3) | 101 (4.0) | 142 (5.6) | 208 (8.2) | 187 (7.4) | 175 (6.9) | 131 (5.2) | 68 (2.7) | 39 (1.5) | 1,121 (44.3) |
| Average rainy days | 5.2 | 5.0 | 7.4 | 11.5 | 19.8 | 23.5 | 27.0 | 25.9 | 25.2 | 23.2 | 15.5 | 8.3 | 197.5 |
Source: Meteoblue

== Demographics ==
Population census of San Luis
| Year | Pop. | ±% p.a. |
|---|---|---|
| 1903 | 5,316 | — |
| 1918 | 6,728 | +1.58% |
| 1939 | 8,464 | +1.10% |
| 1948 | 9,330 | +1.09% |
| 1960 | 12,290 | +2.32% |
| 1970 | 15,133 | +2.10% |
| 1975 | 16,884 | +2.22% |
| 1980 | 17,991 | +1.28% |
| 1990 | 22,143 | +2.10% |
| 1995 | 26,423 | +3.37% |
| 2000 | 26,924 | +0.40% |
| 2007 | 29,645 | +1.34% |
| 2010 | 30,701 | +1.28% |
| 2015 | 33,149 | +1.47% |
| 2020 | 36,172 | +1.85% |
| 2024 | 36,841 | +0.44% |
Source: Philippine Statistics Authority

In the 2024 census, San Luis had a population of 36,841 people. The population density was 870 inhabitants per square kilometre (2,300/sq mi).

== Economy ==
Poverty incidence of San Luis (%)

Source: Philippine Statistics Authority

== Education ==
The San Luis Schools District Office governs all educational institutions within the municipality. It oversees the management and operations of all private and public, from primary to secondary schools.

=== Primary and elementary schools ===
- Abiacao Elementary School
- Balite Primary School
- Banoyo Elementary School
- Boboy Elementary School
- Bonliw Elementary School
- Calumpang East Primary School
- Calumpang Elementary School
- Durungao Primary School
- Locloc Elementary School
- Mahabang Parang Primary School
- Muzon Elementary School
- San Antonio Elementary School
- San Isidro Integrated School
- San Luis Academy
- San Luis Central School
- St. Blaise Community Academy
- Sta. Monica Elementary School
- Taliba Elementary School
- Talon Elementary School
- Tungal Elementary School
- Whiz Creative and Interactive Academy

=== Secondary schools ===
- Banoyo National High School
- Luya Integrated School
- San Luis Senior High School
- Sta. Monica National High School

== Notable personalities ==
- Ai-Ai delas Alas - actress and comedian

== Gallery ==
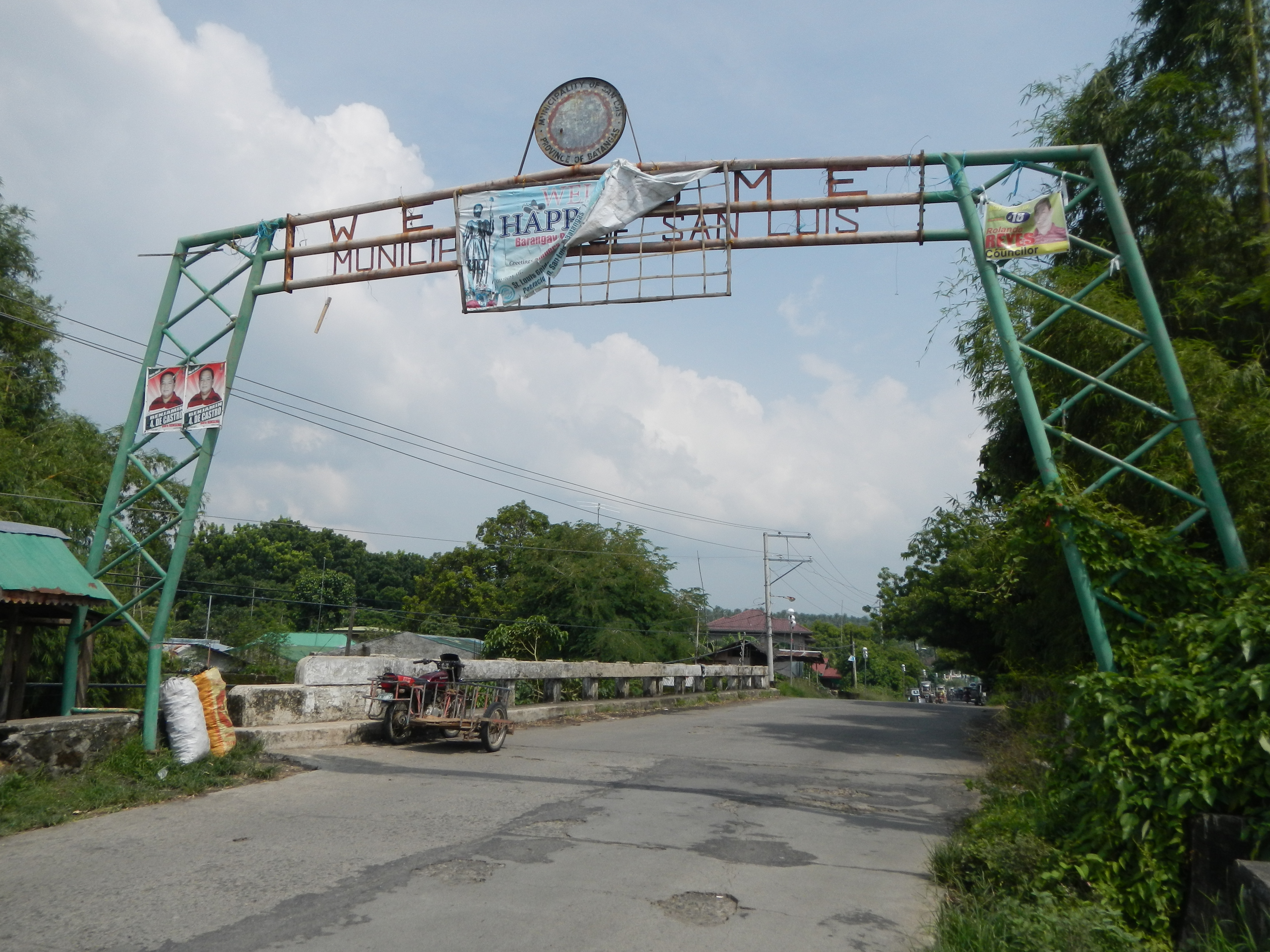
Welcome sign

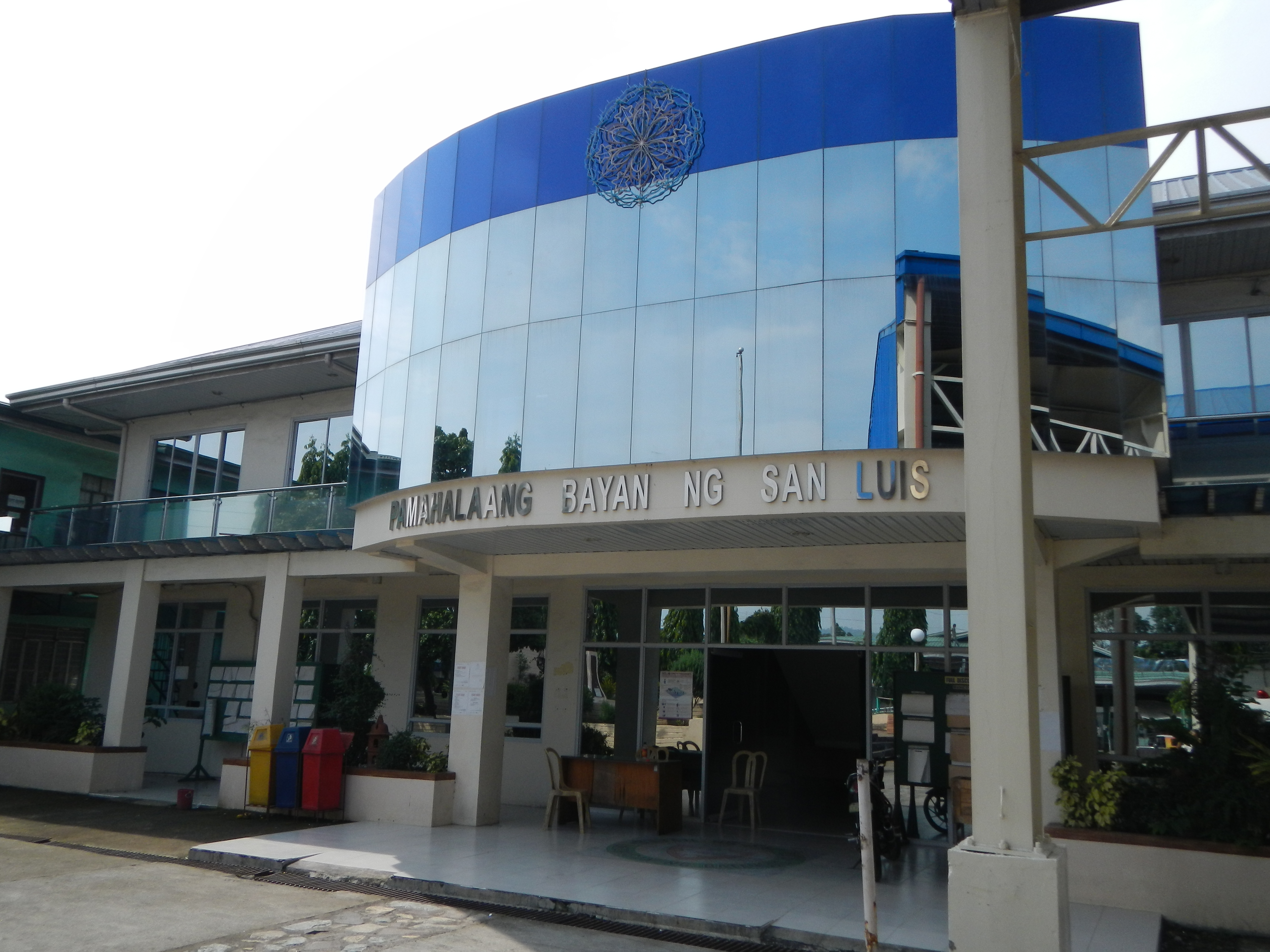
Municipal hall

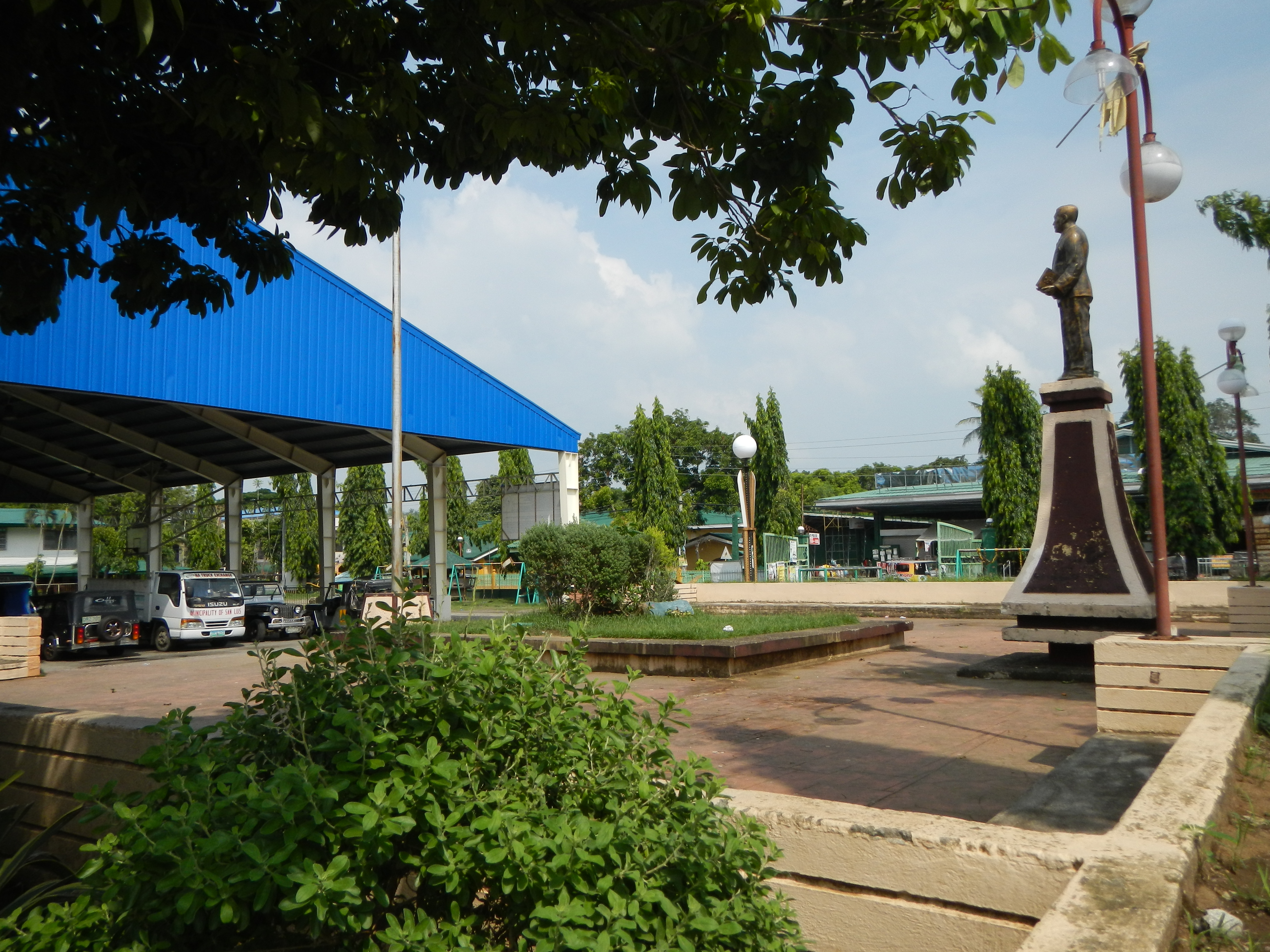
Town plaza

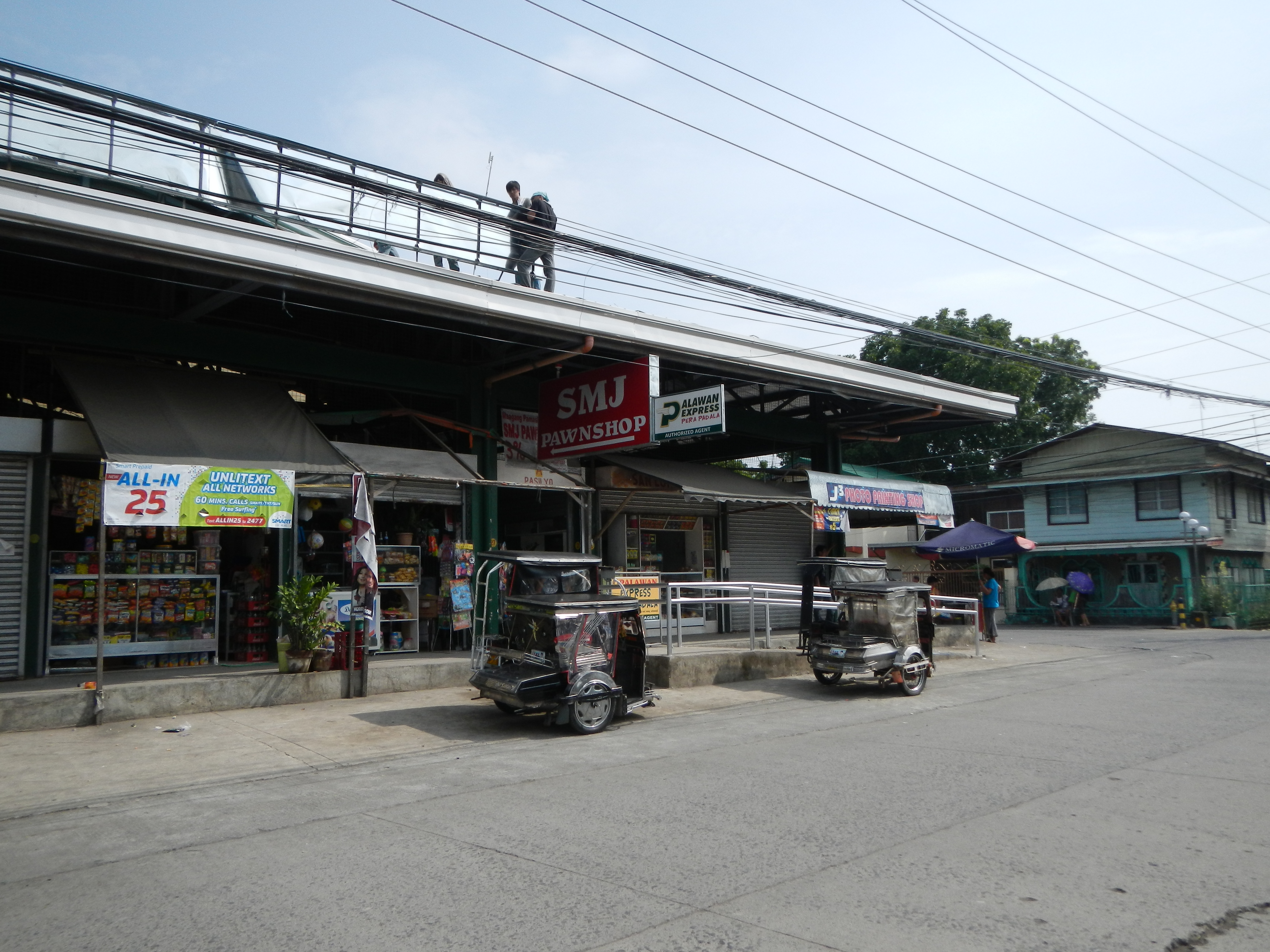
Public market

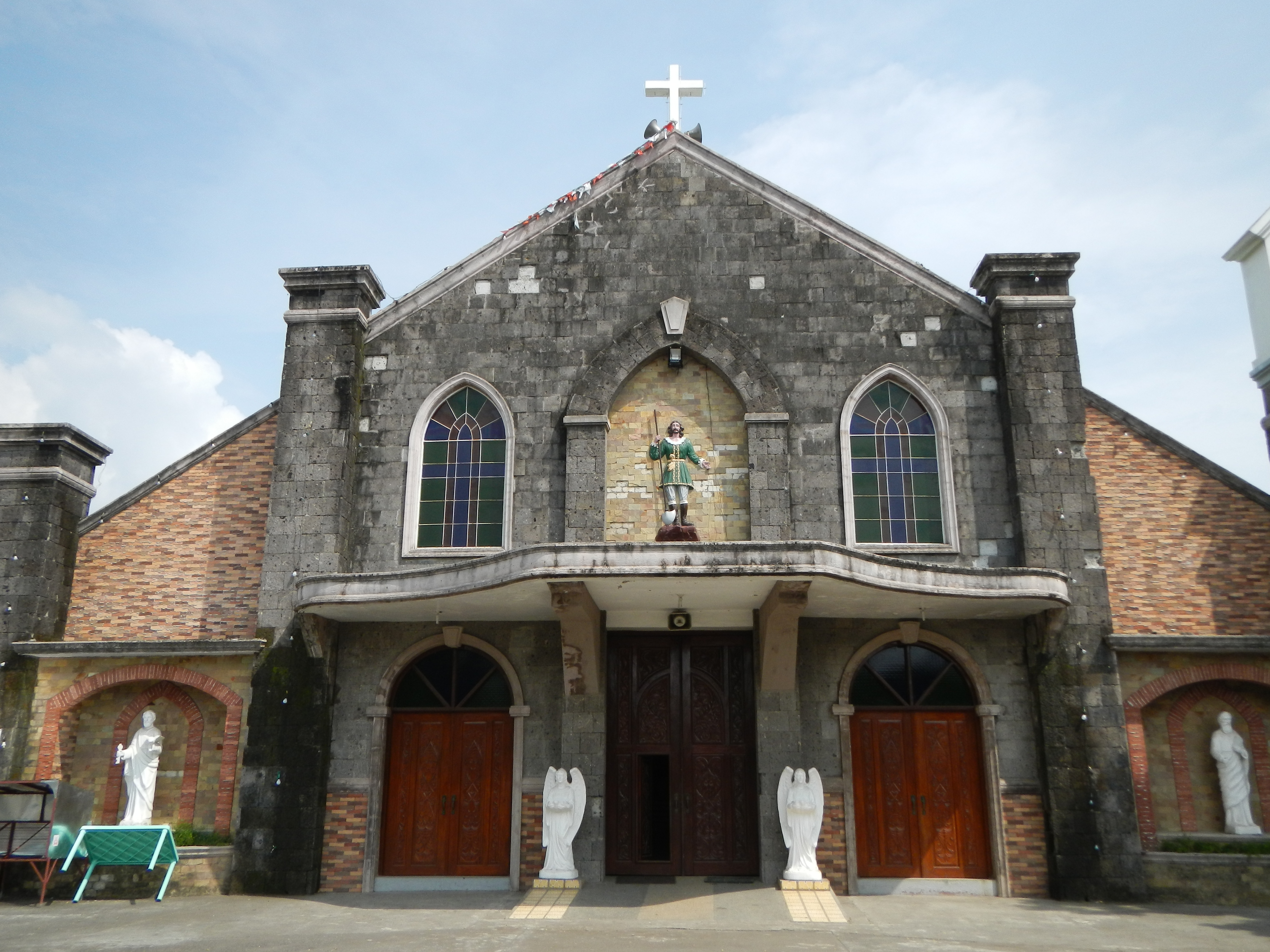
San Isidro Labrador Parish Church

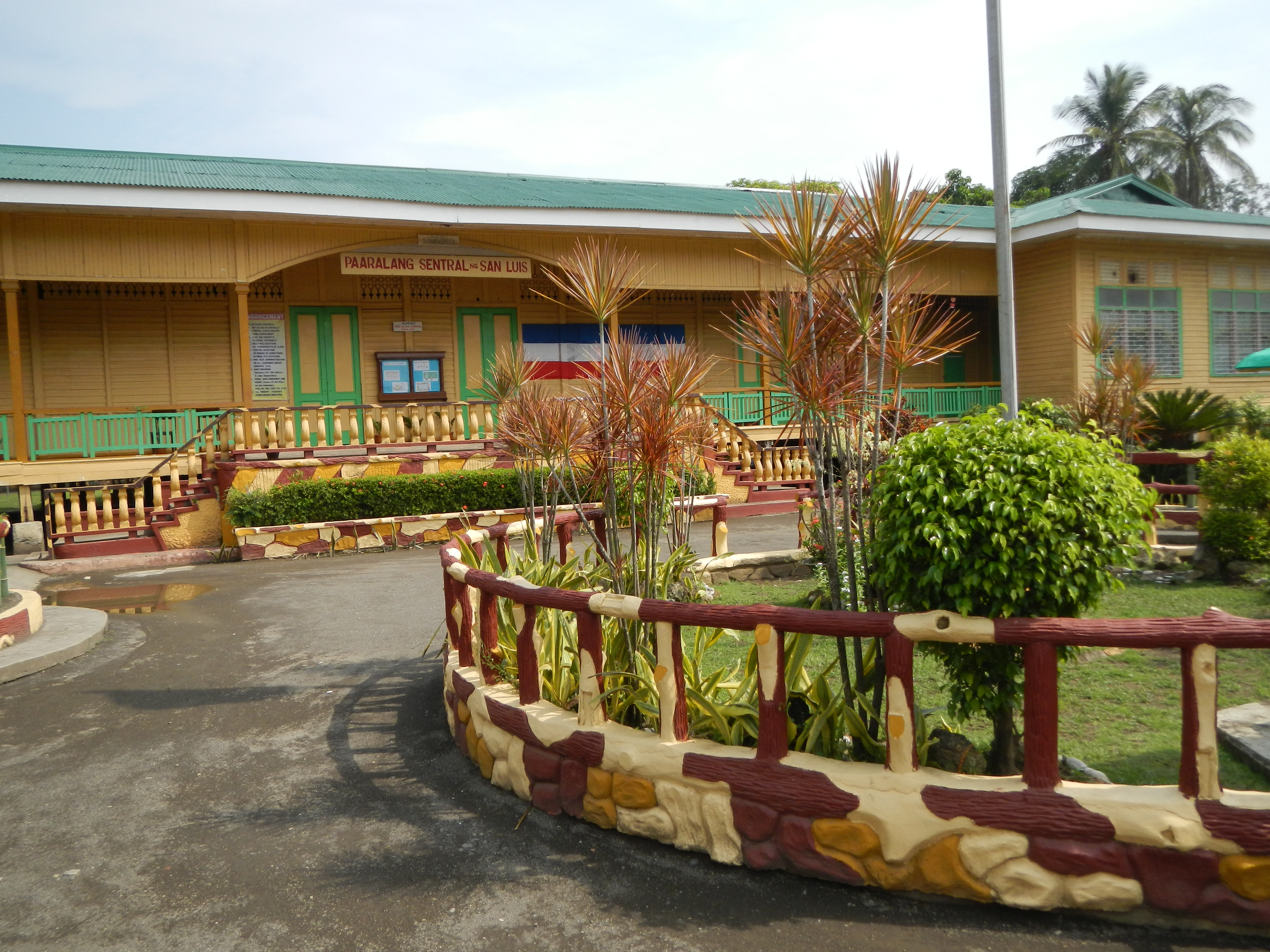
San Luis Central School

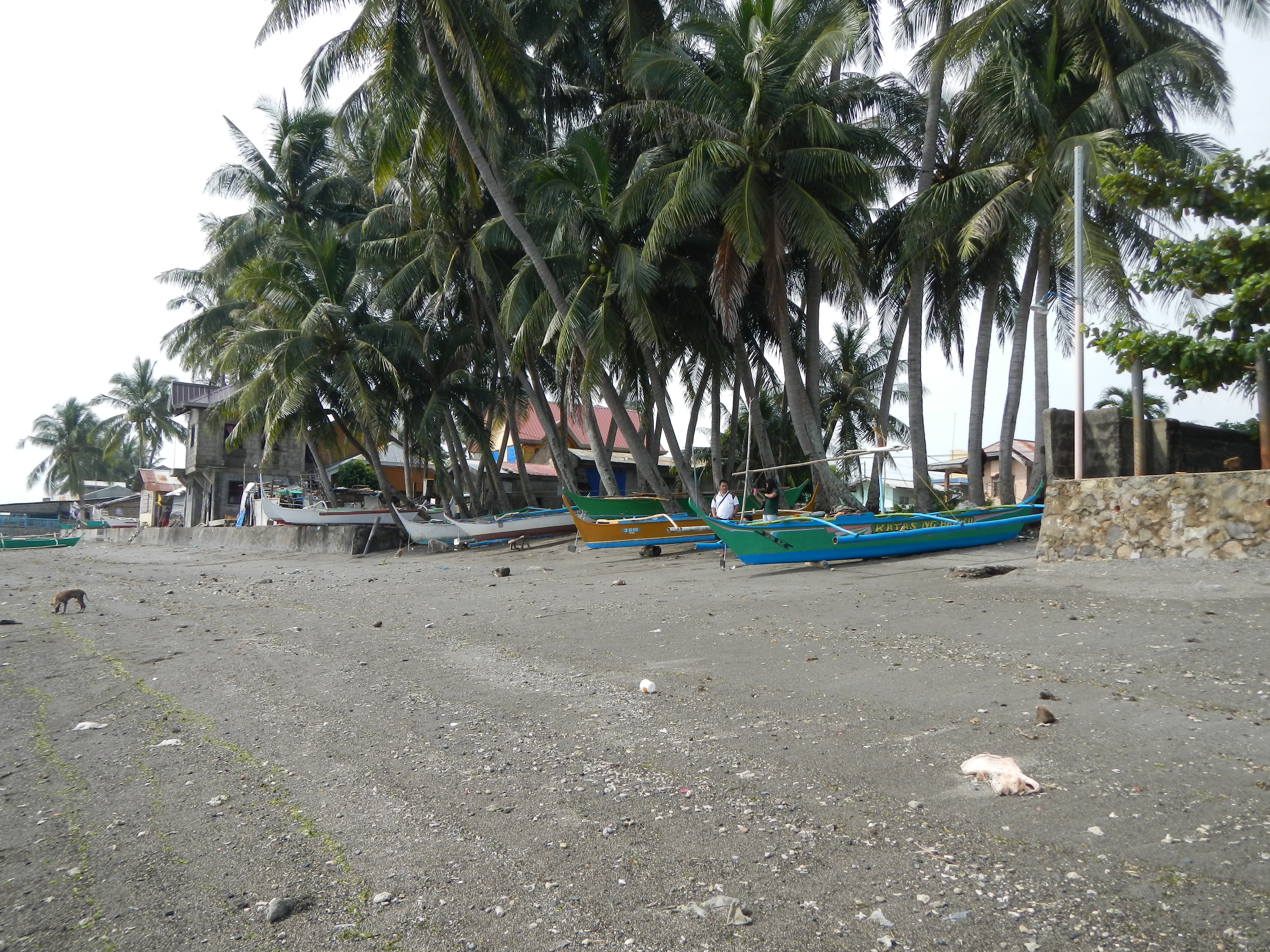
Beach
