= N410 highway =

Road in the Philippine provinces of Cavite and Batangas

Route 410

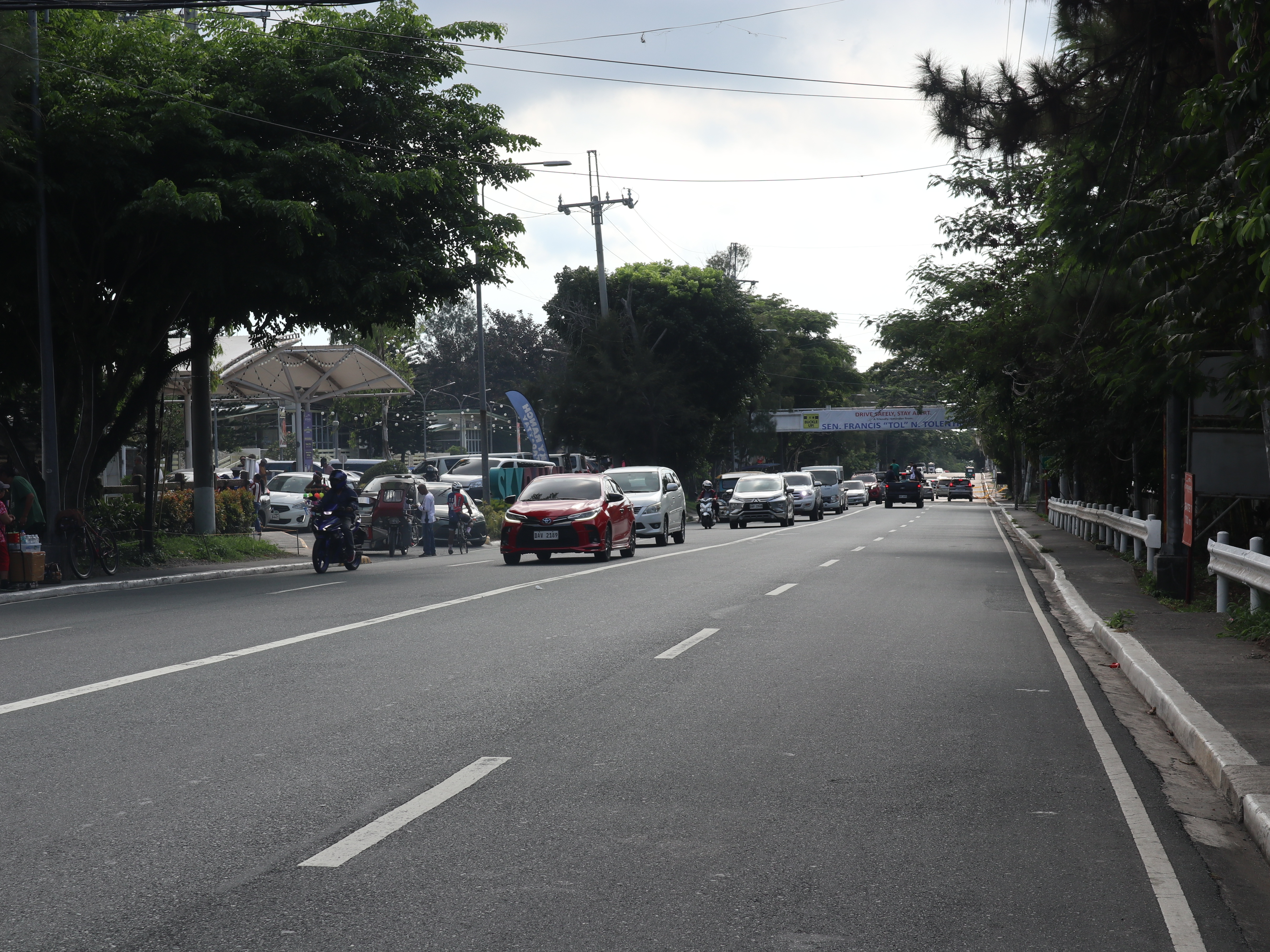
- Route 410 beside Skyranch in Brgy. Kaybagal South, Tagaytay.

Route information
- Maintained by the Department of Public Works and Highways
- Length: 56.839 km (35.318 mi)
- Component highways: N410 (Aguinaldo Highway) J.P. Rizal Street (Silang, Cavite) N410 (Tagaytay–Nasugbu Highway) N410 (Diokno Highway)

Major junctions
- From: N419 at Dasmariñas–Silang boundary
- N421 in Tagaytay; N413 in Tagaytay; N402 in Tagaytay; N404 in Alfonso, Cavite and Laurel, Batangas; N406 in Alfonso, Cavite and Laurel, Batangas; N407 in Alfonso, Cavite and Calaca, Batangas
- To: N436 in Lemery, Batangas

Location
- Country: Philippines
- Provinces: Cavite and Batangas
- Major cities: Tagaytay and Calaca
- Towns: Silang, Alfonso, Laurel, and Lemery

Highway system
- Roads in the Philippines; Highways; Expressways; List
← N409	→ N411

National Route 410 (N410) forms part of the Philippine highway network. It runs from southern Cavite to Batangas.

== Route description ==
=== Silang to Tagaytay ===
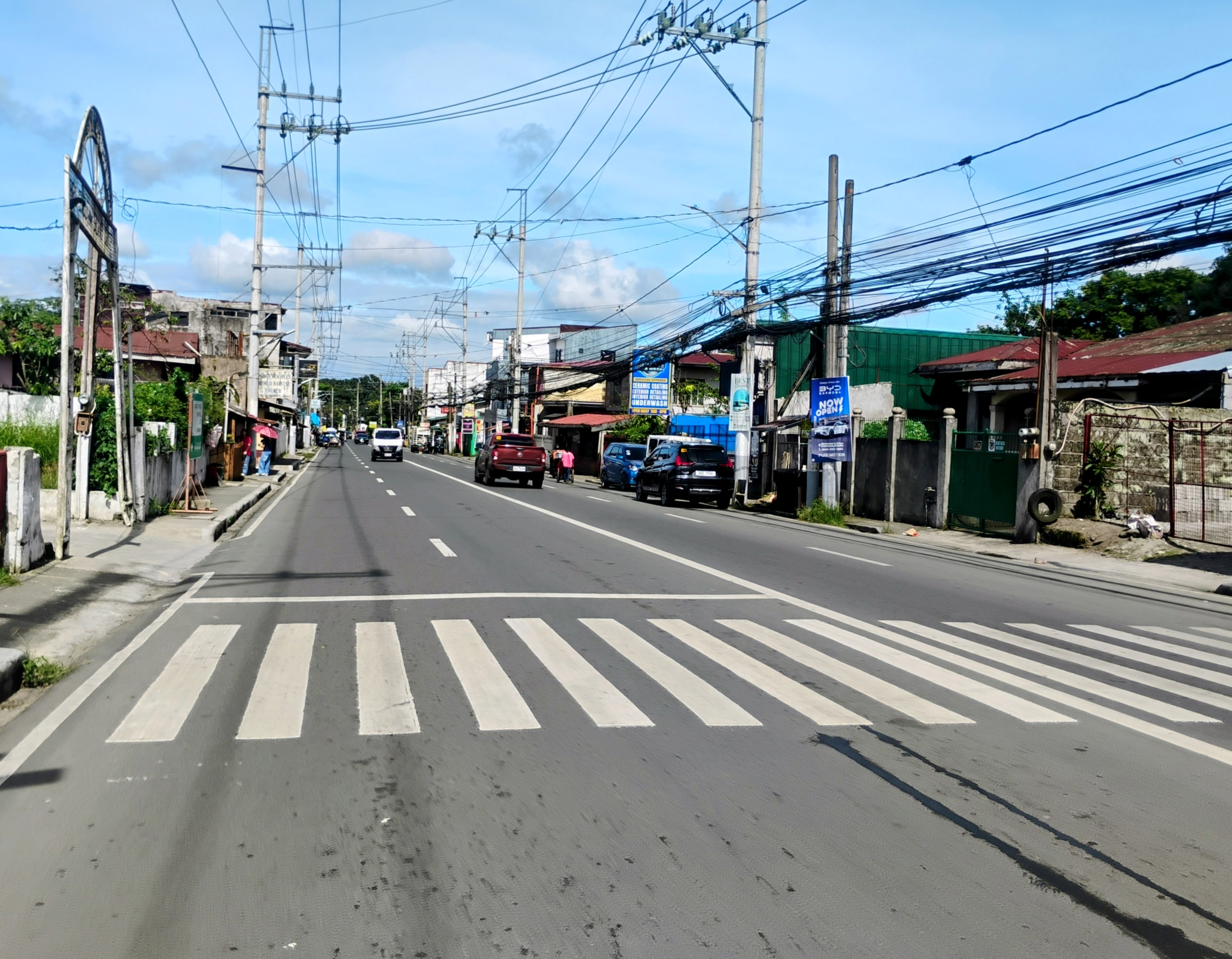
N410 as J.P. Rizal Street in Silang

Map of J.P. Rizal Street in Silang, part of N410

N410 starts at the boundary of Silang and Dasmariñas in Cavite as the physical continuation of N419 (Aguinaldo Highway). The route then shifts slightly to the east as J.P. Rizal Street, traversing the Silang town proper before returning to Aguinaldo Highway. It then enters the city of Tagaytay, where Aguinaldo Highway ends at the Tagaytay Rotonda.

=== Tagaytay to Calaca ===
Past the Tagaytay Rotonda, N410 turns southwest to become the Tagaytay–Nasugbu Highway. It then cuts through the western part Tagaytay before going along the municipal boundaries of Alfonso, Cavite and Laurel, Batangas.

=== Calaca to Lemery ===
At the intersection at the provincial boundary of Cavite and Batangas, N410 turns southeast as Diokno Highway, a secondary highway that connects Calaca to Lemery through a moutaineous terrain. The route ends at the Palico-Balayan-Batangas Road in Lemery.

== Intersections ==
Province	City/Municipality	km	mi	Destinations	Notes
Cavite	Dasmariñas–Silang boundary	39	24	N419 (Aguinaldo Highway) – Manila, Bacoor, Imus	Northern terminus. Route designation changes to N410.
Cavite	Silang			E3 (CALAX Silang Exit) – Santa Rosa, Biñan, Calamba	Connection to E3 (CAVITEX) under construction.
Cavite	Silang	41	25	Silang Diversion Road (Aguinaldo Highway)	North end of diversion road.
Cavite	Silang	42.2	26.2	Bancal–Maguyam–Silang Road — Carmona, General Mariano Alvarez	
Cavite	Silang Kilometer Zero	43	27		Silang Town Proper.
Cavite	Silang			E. Asuncion Street — Tagaytay, Santa Rosa	Alternate access to N420 (Santa Rosa–Tagaytay Road).
Cavite	Silang	44.8	27.8	Silang–Banay Banay–Indang Road	
Cavite	Silang			Silang Diversion Road (Aguinaldo Highway)	Southern end of diversion road.
Cavite	Silang			East–West Lateral Road — Indang, Amadeo	Full length of the road under construction.
Cavite	Silang–Tagaytay boundary	57.2	35.5	Cavite 3rd District Engineering Office–Cavite 2nd District Engineering Office highway boundary	
Cavite	Tagaytay			Tagaytay Bypass Road — Mendez, Alfonso	
Cavite	Tagaytay	56	35	N421 (Tagaytay–Calamba Road) / Tagaytay–Talisay Road – Talisay, Laurel, Santa Rosa	Tagaytay rotunda. N410 starts following Tagaytay–Nasugbu Road. Eastbound goes to Santa Rosa and E2 (South Luzon Expressway).
Cavite	Tagaytay	58	36	N413 (Mahogany Avenue)	
Cavite	Tagaytay Kilometer Zero	59	37	Crisanto M. de los Reyes Avenue — Amadeo, Dasmariñas, General Trias	
Cavite	Tagaytay	61	38	N413 (Mahogany Avenue)	
Cavite	Tagaytay	62	39	N402 (Indang–Mendez–Tagaytay Road)	Mendez Crossing.
Cavite	Tagaytay			Maglabe Drive	Alternate access to Mendez.
Cavite–Batangas boundary	Alfonso–Laurel boundary	65	40	N404 (Indang–Alfonso–Luksuhin Road)	Northbound to Alfonso town proper
Cavite–Batangas boundary	Alfonso–Laurel boundary			As-is–Niyugan Road	Alternate access to Laurel town proper.
Cavite–Batangas boundary	Alfonso–Laurel boundary	70	43	N406 (Kaytitinga–Amuyong Road) – Magallanes	Amuyong Junction.
Cavite–Batangas boundary	Alfonso–Calaca boundary	72.017	44.749	Cavite 2nd District Engineering Office–Batangas 1st District Engineering Office highway boundary	
Cavite–Batangas boundary	Alfonso–Calaca boundary	71.078	44.166	N407 (Tagaytay–Nasugbu Highway) – Tuy, Lian	Dayap Junction. N410 starts following Diokno Highway alignment.
Batangas	Calaca	74.5	46.3	Laurel–Calaca Road	Left is going to Laurel Town Proper, while right is going to Calaca Town Proper
Batangas	Lemery	91.1	56.6	N436 (Palico–Balayan–Batangas Road) – Taal, Balayan, Calatagan	Southern terminus. Westbound goes to Calaca town proper, Balayan & Calatagan; eastbound to Batangas City, Lemery town proper & Taal.
1.000 mi = 1.609 km; 1.000 km = 0.621 mi: Unopened
