= Tagaytay–Calamba Road =

Road in the Philippines

Tagaytay–Calamba Road
- Calamba–Tagaytay Road

Route information
- Maintained by Department of Public Works and Highways - Cavite 2nd District Engineering Office and Laguna 2nd District Engineering Office
- Length: 23.166 km (14.395 mi) Tagaytay link: 8.597 km (5.342 mi); Calamba–Tagaytay Link: 5.5 km (3.4 mi); Calamba segment: 14.569 km (9.053 mi)
- Component highways: N421 in Tagaytay

Major junctions
- West end: N410 (Aguinaldo Highway & Tagaytay–Nasugbu Highway) / Tagaytay–Talisay Road in Tagaytay
- N420 (Santa Rosa–Tagaytay Road) in Tagaytay; N421 (Ligaya Drive) in Tagaytay
- East end: N1 (Manila South Road) in Calamba

Location
- Country: Philippines
- Provinces: Cavite and Laguna
- Major cities: Calamba and Tagaytay

Highway system
- Roads in the Philippines; Highways; Expressways; List

The Tagaytay–Calamba Road is a two- to four-lane, secondary and tertiary road in Laguna and Cavite, Philippines. It connects the city of Calamba in Laguna and the city of Tagaytay in Cavite.

The segment of road from its western terminus at Tagaytay Rotonda to Ligaya Drive, both in Tagaytay, forms part of National Route 421 (N421) of the Philippine highway network, while the rest of the road remains unnumbered.

== Route description ==
=== Tagaytay ===
The road starts at the Tagaytay Rotonda, a four-way roundabout with Aguinaldo Highway, Tagaytay–Nasugbu Highway, and Tagaytay–Talisay Road in Tagaytay City. It runs east along the Tagaytay Ridge. Various restaurants, hotels, residential developments, and tourists attractions could be found along this road. It then intersects the Santa Rosa–Tagaytay Road, which provides access to the South Luzon Expressway, and Ligaya Drive, where N421 turns towards Talisay, Batangas and the road transitions from a secondary road to a tertiary road. It then climbs Mount Sungay and terminates at the People's Park in the Sky. The entire Tagaytay segment is also known as Isaac O. Tolentino Avenue.

=== Calamba–Tagaytay Link ===
The road's Tagaytay and Calamba sections are interconnected by Calamba–Tagaytay Link Bunggo–Mabato Bridge, an unclassified route. It begins at Mount Sungay, traversing the mountainous eastern edge of Tagaytay Ridge. It descends in elevation as it enters Calamba, Laguna, and connects with the Calamba section near Tagaytay Highlands.

=== Calamba ===
The road's Calamba segment, a tertiary road, at the southwestern boundary of Calamba, Laguna, running east from the northern gate to Tagaytay Highlands. It is divided and locally known as Bunggo Road, Burol Road, Lawa–Punta Road, and Barandal Road, after the barangays it traverses through, respectively. It also traverses residential subdivisions and Calamba Premiere Industrial Park. It crosses beneath the South Luzon Expressway before terminating at Manila South Road (Old National Highway) in barangay Parian.

== History ==
The road was built with its initial segment from Highway 17 (present-day Aguinaldo Highway and Tagaytay–Nasugbu Highway) to Mount Sungay at the eastern part of Tagaytay. Based on a 1941 map by the United States Coast and Geodetic Survey, it was supposed to connect Tagaytay to Santo Tomas, Batangas, but the plan did not materialize as it was later apparently realigned towards Calamba, Laguna, thus assuming the name Tagaytay–Calamba Road.

On March 15, 2017, Representatives Abraham Tolentino (Cavite–7th) and Celso Lobregat (Zamboanga City–1st) filed House Bill No. 4947 that seeks to rename the road's existing Tagaytay segment in honor of Isaac Tolentino, the former's father who served as Tagaytay mayor from 1954 to 1980 and died in 2016. On March 12, 2018, the Senate unanimously passed the bill's Senate counterpart that was sponsored by Senator Manny Pacquiao. On June 29, 2018, President Rodrigo Duterte signed Republic Act No. 11046, officially renaming such segment to Isaac O. Tolentino Avenue.

The road, which was initially discontinuous, became a continuous thoroughfare in the 2020s after the Calamba–Tagaytay Link was constructed to connect its Tagaytay and Calamba segments.
