= Tagaytay–Nasugbu Highway =

Road in the Philippine provinces of Cavite and Batangas

Tagaytay–Nasugbu Highway
- Tagaytay–Nasugbu Road
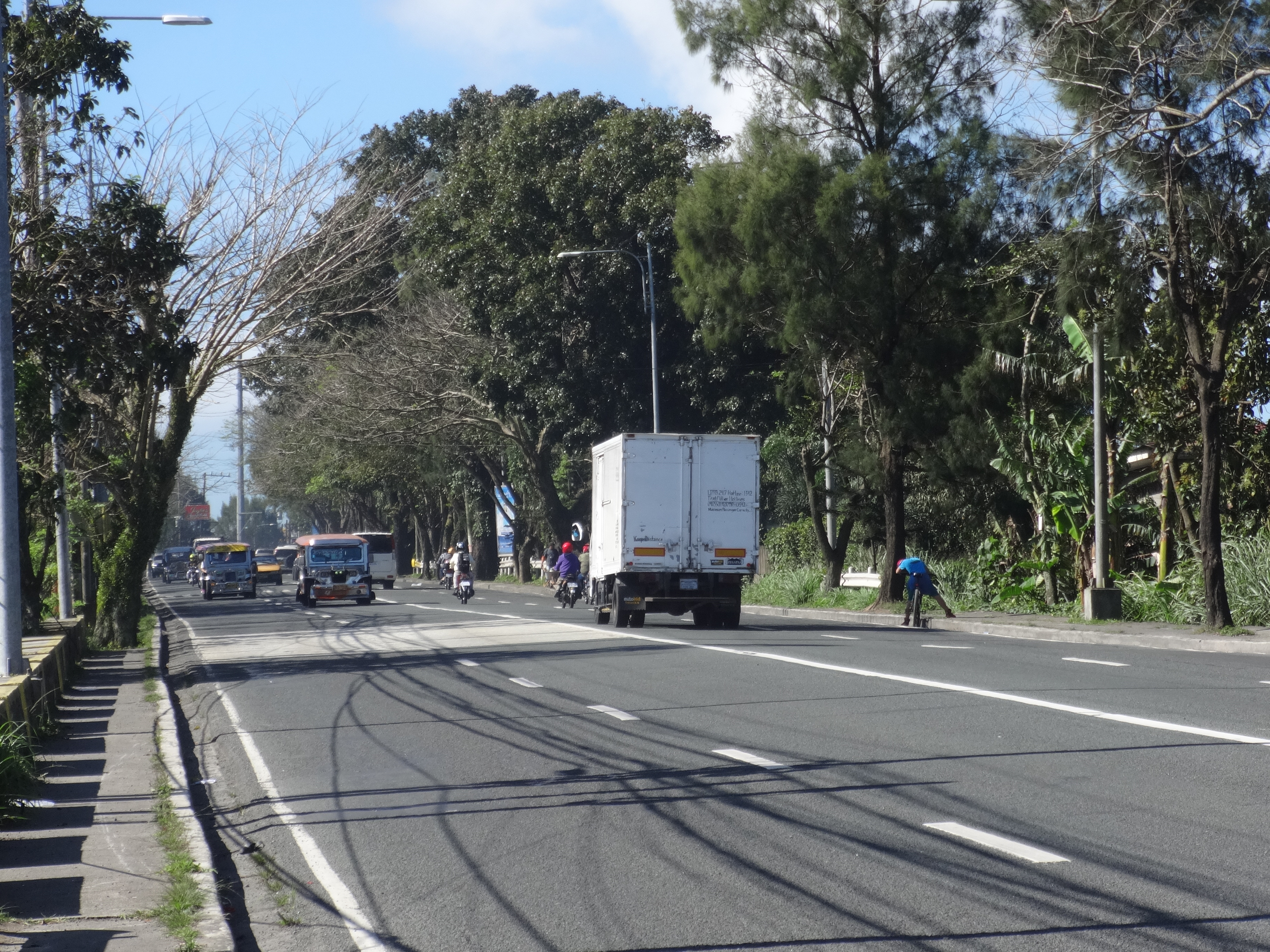
- A segment of the road in Tagaytay

Route information
- Maintained by Department of Public Works and Highways - Cavite 2nd District Engineering Office and Batangas 1st District Engineering Office
- Length: 47.578 km (29.564 mi)
- Component highways: N410 east of Diokno Highway; N407 west of Diokno Highway

Major junctions
- East end: N410 (Aguinaldo Highway) / N421 (Tagaytay–Calamba Road) in Tagaytay
- N413 (Mahogany Avenue) in Tagaytay; N402 (Mendez–Tagaytay Road) in Tagaytay; N402-1 (Indang–Alfonso Road) in Alfonso; N406 (Amuyong–Kaytitingga Road) in Alfonso; N410 (Diokno Highway) at Alfonso–Calaca boundary; N436 (Palico–Balayan–Batangas Road) in Tuy; N408 (Nasugbu–Lian–Calatagan Road) in Nasugbu
- West end: N407 (Ternate–Nasugbu Road) in Nasugbu

Location
- Country: Philippines
- Provinces: Batangas, Cavite
- Major cities: Calaca, Tagaytay
- Towns: Alfonso, Laurel, Nasugbu, Tuy

Highway system
- Roads in the Philippines; Highways; Expressways; List

The Tagaytay–Nasugbu Highway, alternatively known as Tagaytay–Nasugbu Road or locally as Nasugbu Highway and formerly as Tagaytay–Tuy–Nasugbu Port Road, is a 47.578-kilometer (29.564 mi), two-to-four lane, secondary highway in the provinces of Cavite and Batangas, Philippines, that connects the city of Tagaytay in Cavite and the municipality of Nasugbu in Batangas.

The entire road forms part of National Route 410 (N410) from Tagaytay to the Batangas–Cavite provincial boundary and National Route 407 (N407) of the Philippine highway network from such boundary to Nasugbu. It is also locally known as J.P. Laurel Street in Nasugbu.

== Route description ==
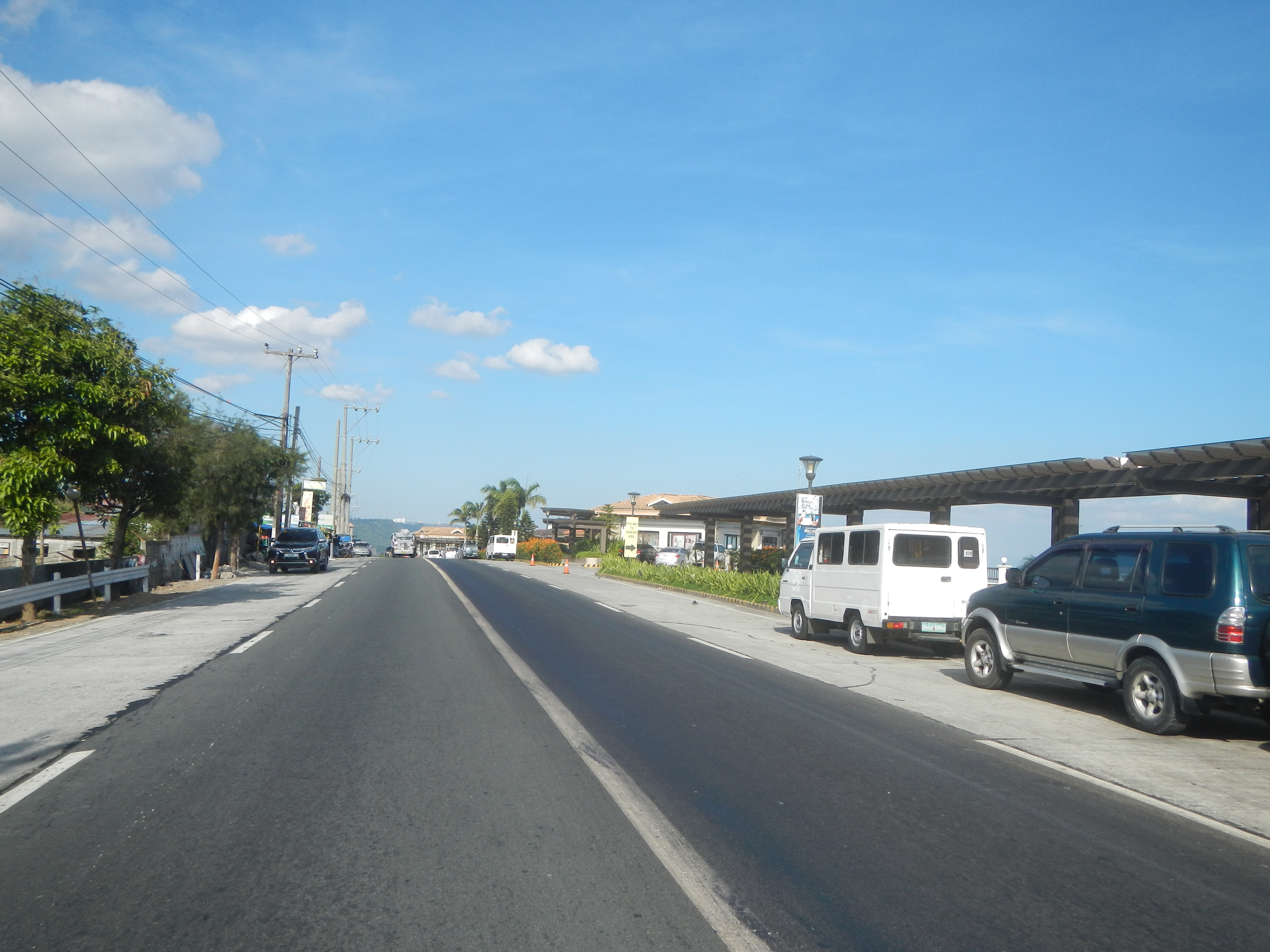
The highway along the boundary of Alfonso, Cavite and Laurel, Batangas, passing by the Twin Lakes Shopping Village

The highway starts at Tagaytay Rotunda, where it intersects with Aguinaldo Highway, Tagaytay–Calamba Road and Tagaytay–Talisay Road in Tagaytay, Cavite. It then runs to the west along the Tagaytay Ridge, eventually traversing the boundary of Alfonso, Cavite and Laurel, Batangas. The Tagaytay Flyover runs along the highway, crossing its intersection with Mendez–Tagaytay Road in Tagaytay. The highway then fully enters the province of Batangas, where it traverses north of Mount Batulao, the city of Calaca, and the towns of Nasugbu and Tuy. It re-enters Nasugbu, turning north at the roundabout intersection with the Nasugbu–Lian–Calatagan Road. From this point, it is locally known as J.P. Laurel Street as it heads toward the Nasugbu poblacion. After cutting through the town proper, the segment terminates near the Coast Guard Sub-Station Nasugbu, where the route continues north as the Ternate–Nasugbu Road.

=== Alternate names ===
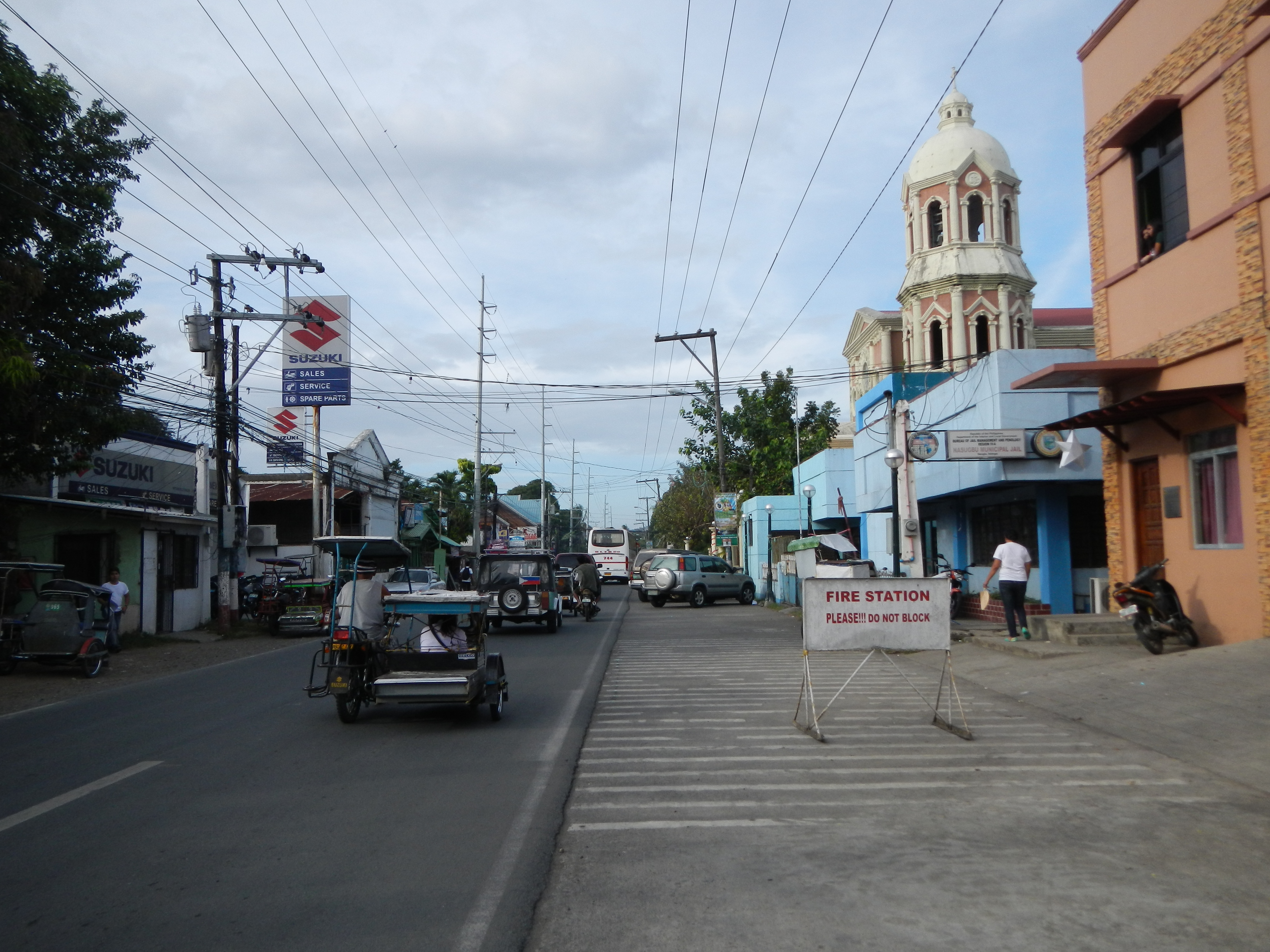
The highway as J.P. Laurel Street in Nasugbu

The highway's segment from Palico Rotonda to its western terminus in Nasugbu is also known as Palico-Nasugbu Highway or Tuy-Nasugbu Highway. Its segment in Cavite is also known as Tagaytay Laurel Road or Emilio Aguinaldo Highway (simply Aguinaldo Highway), named after General Emilio Aguinaldo, the country's first president and a native of Cavite. According to the Department of Public Works and Highways, its segment from its eastern terminus at Tagaytay Rotonda to the eastern end of Mahogany Avenue, both in Tagaytay, is part of the Tagaytay–Manila via Silang Road, while its segment from there to Diokno Highway is officially named as Tagaytay-Batangas via Tuy Road; the rest of the highway is officially named as is. North and west of its intersection with Nasugbu–Lian–Calatagan Road and through the Nasugbu town proper, it is locally known as J.P. Laurel Street.

== History ==
The highway originally existed as a first-class road in Nasugbu linking Batangas–Bauan–Nasugbu Road to Barangay Wawa and the Lumbangan–Palico (Nasugbu–Tuy) section of Batangas–Bauan–Nasugbu Road, an old road which linked Nasugbu with Batangas. The latter was constructed in the mid-1910s. A new road that connects Tuy to the newly-established city of Tagaytay was later constructed in the 1930s and was made part of the highway. The latter also formed part of Highway 17 that linked Imus with Batangas. The entire stretch of the highway was also referred to as Tagaytay-Tuy-Nasugbu Port Road.

== Intersections ==
Intersections are numbered by kilometer post, with Rizal Park in Manila designated as Kilometer 0.

Province	City/Municipality	km	mi	Destinations	Notes
Cavite	Tagaytay	58.178	36.150	N410 (Aguinaldo Highway) / N421 (Tagaytay–Calamba Road) / Tagaytay-Talisay Road	Roundabout. Eastern terminus.
Cavite	Tagaytay	58.010	36.046	N413 (Mahogany Avenue)	Southern end of Tagaytay–Manila via Silang Road. Start of Tagaytay-Batangas via Tuy Road.
Cavite	Tagaytay			Crisanto Mendoza de los Reyes Avenue – Amadeo	
Cavite	Tagaytay	60.630	37.674	N413 (Mahogany Avenue)	
Cavite	Tagaytay	61.690	38.332	N402 (Mendez–Tagaytay Road) – Mendez, Indang	Crossing motorists are carried by the Tagaytay Flyover.
Cavite–Batangas boundary	Alfonso–Laurel boundary			N402-1 (Indang–Alfonso Road) – Alfonso, Indang	
Cavite–Batangas boundary	Alfonso–Laurel boundary			N406 (Amuyong–Kaytitingga Road) – Alfonso, Magallanes	
Cavite–Batangas boundary	Alfonso–Calaca boundary	72.017	44.749	Cavite 2nd District Engineering Office–Batangas 1st District Engineering Office highway boundary.	
Cavite–Batangas boundary	Alfonso–Calaca boundary	71.078	44.166	N410 (Diokno Highway / Payapa Road) – Lemery	Route number changes from N410 to N407. End of Tagaytay-Batangas via Tuy Road.
Batangas	Tuy	92.917	57.736	Cacauan Bridge	
Batangas	Tuy			N436 (Palico–Balayan–Batangas Road) – Balayan	Roundabout (Palico Rotonda). Start of Palico-Nasugbu Highway.
Batangas	Tuy–Nasugbu boundary	93.522	58.112	Palico Bridge over Palico River	
Batangas	Nasugbu	98.3	61.1	N408 (Nasugbu–Lian–Calatagan Road) – Lian, Calatagan	Roundabout.
Batangas	Nasugbu	103.65	64.41	N407 (Ternate–Nasugbu Road) – Ternate	Unsignalled intersection. Western terminus.
1.000 mi = 1.609 km; 1.000 km = 0.621 mi: Route transition
