= N407 highway =

Road in the Philippines

Route 407
- Ternate–Nasugbu Road; Tagaytay–Nasugbu Highway

Route information
- Maintained by Department of Public Works and Highways - Cavite 2nd District Engineering Office & Batangas 1st District Engineering Office
- Length: 62.19 km (38.64 mi)

Major junctions
- East end: N410 (Tagaytay–Nasugbu Highway / Diokno Highway) in Calaca, Batangas
- N436 (Palico–Balayan–Batangas Road) in Tuy, Batangas; N408 (Nasugbu–Lian–Calatagan Road) in Nasugbu, Batangas
- West end: N405 (Governor's Drive / Caylabne Road) in Ternate, Cavite

Location
- Country: Philippines
- Provinces: Batangas, Cavite
- Towns: Calaca, Tuy, Nasugbu, Maragondon, Ternate

Highway system
- Roads in the Philippines; Highways; Expressways; List
← N406	→ N408

National Route 407 (N407) forms part of the Philippine highway network. It runs from Batangas to Cavite.

== Route description ==
=== Calaca to Nasugbu ===
N407 starts at the intersection with N410 (Tagaytay–Nasugbu Highway and Diokno Highway) in Calaca, Batangas, near the provincial boundary of Cavite and Batangas. To the west, then traverses Nasugbu, Tuy (where it turns east at Palico Junction, its intersection with N427 (Palico–Balayan–Batangas Road)), and Nasugbu once again. It turns north at a roundabout intersection with Nasugbu–Lian–Calatagan Road and becomes locally known as J.P. Laurel Street up to its intersection with the access road to Coast Guard Sub-Station Nasugbu.

=== Nasugbu to Ternate ===
Past the Coast Guard Sub-Station Nasugbu, N407 becomes Ternate–Nasugbu Road as it continues its course up north. It then enters Cavite at Maragondon and Ternate, where it terminates at N405 (Caylabne Road and Governor's Drive).
