= Maragondon–Magallanes–Amuyong Road =

Road in Cavite, Philippines

Maragondon–Magallanes–Amuyong Road
- Maragondon–Magallanes–Alfonso Road
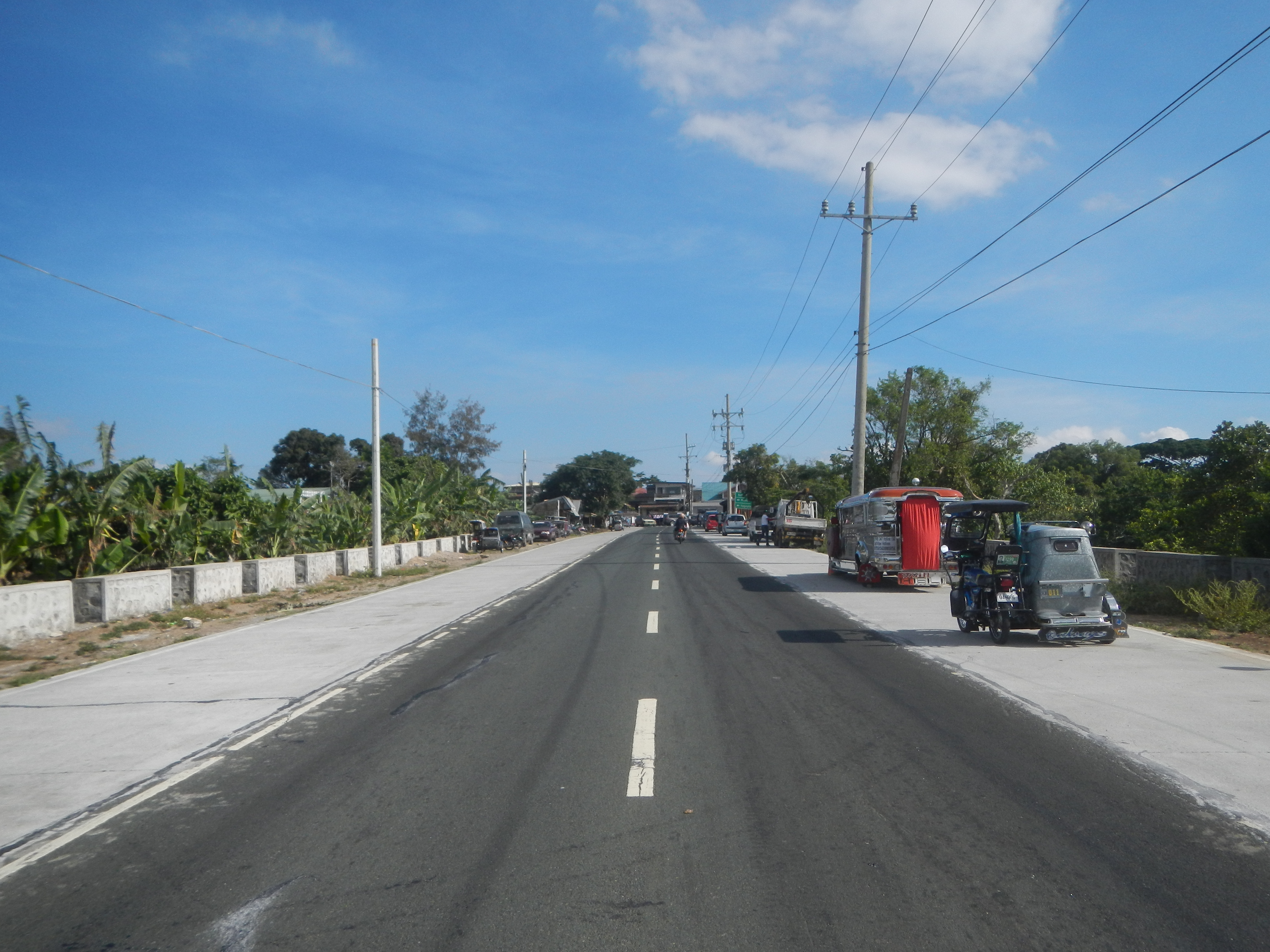
- Maragondon–Magallanes–Amuyong Road in Alfonso

Route information
- Maintained by Department of Public Works and Highways (DPWH) - Cavite 2nd District Engineering Office
- Length: 37.97 km (23.59 mi)
- Component highways: N406

Major junctions
- North end: N405 (Governor's Drive) in Maragondon
- South end: N410 (Tagaytay–Nasugbu Highway) in Alfonso

Location
- Country: Philippines
- Provinces: Cavite
- Towns: Maragondon, Naic, Magallanes, Alfonso

Highway system
- Roads in the Philippines; Highways; Expressways; List
← N405	→ N407

The Maragondon–Magallanes–Amuyong Road or Maragondon–Magallanes–Alfonso Road is a two- to four-lane, secondary road in Cavite, Philippines. It connects the municipality of Maragondon and the municipality of Alfonso.

The entire road is designated as National Route 406 (N406) of the Philippine highway network.

== Intersections ==
The entire route is located in Cavite. Intersections are numbered by kilometer posts, with Rizal Park in Manila designated as kilometer zero.

City/Municipality	km	mi	Destinations	Notes
Maragondon	53	33	N405 (Governor's Drive)	Northern terminus
Maragondon	54	34	Maragondon Kilometer Zero	
Maragondon-Naic Boundary	56.8	35.3		near Bucal 4 Elementary School
Naic	57	35	Bucal-Malainen Bypass Road	Under construction
Naic	57.2	35.5	Pantihan-Taywanak-Alfonso Road	Going to Barangay Pantihan, Maragondon, ends in Alfonso Town Proper
Naic-Maragondon Boundary	57.75	35.88	Mabacao Bridge	
Maragondon	59.3	36.8	Mabacao-Gen. Aguinaldo-Alfonso Road	Right going to Gen. Aguinaldo and Alfonso
Maragondon	66	41	Mounts Palay-Palay–Mataas-na-Gulod Protected Landscape jumpoff point	
Maragondon-Magallanes Boundary	67.3	41.8	Hagdan Brige	
Magallanes	67.6	42.0	Red Bridge	
Magallanes	70	43	De Guia Street	Designated as Magallanes Kilometer Zero
Magallanes	74	46	Indang-Magallanes-Nasugbu Road Crossing	left is going to Gen. Aguinaldo and ends Indang, right is going to Nasugbu
Magallanes	81.9	50.9	Kay-Apas Road	
Alfonso	85.8	53.3	Alfonso-Sinaliw-Kaytitinga Crossing	
Alfonso	89	55	Cavite–Tagaytay–Batangas Expressway	Future Magallanes Exit
Alfonso	91.3	56.7	N410 (Tagaytay–Nasugbu Highway)	Southern terminus.
1.000 mi = 1.609 km; 1.000 km = 0.621 mi: Unopened
