= Mahogany Avenue =

Road in Tagaytay, Philippines

Mahogany Avenue
- Mahogany Road; J. P. Rizal Street
- Mahogany Avenue highlighted in red

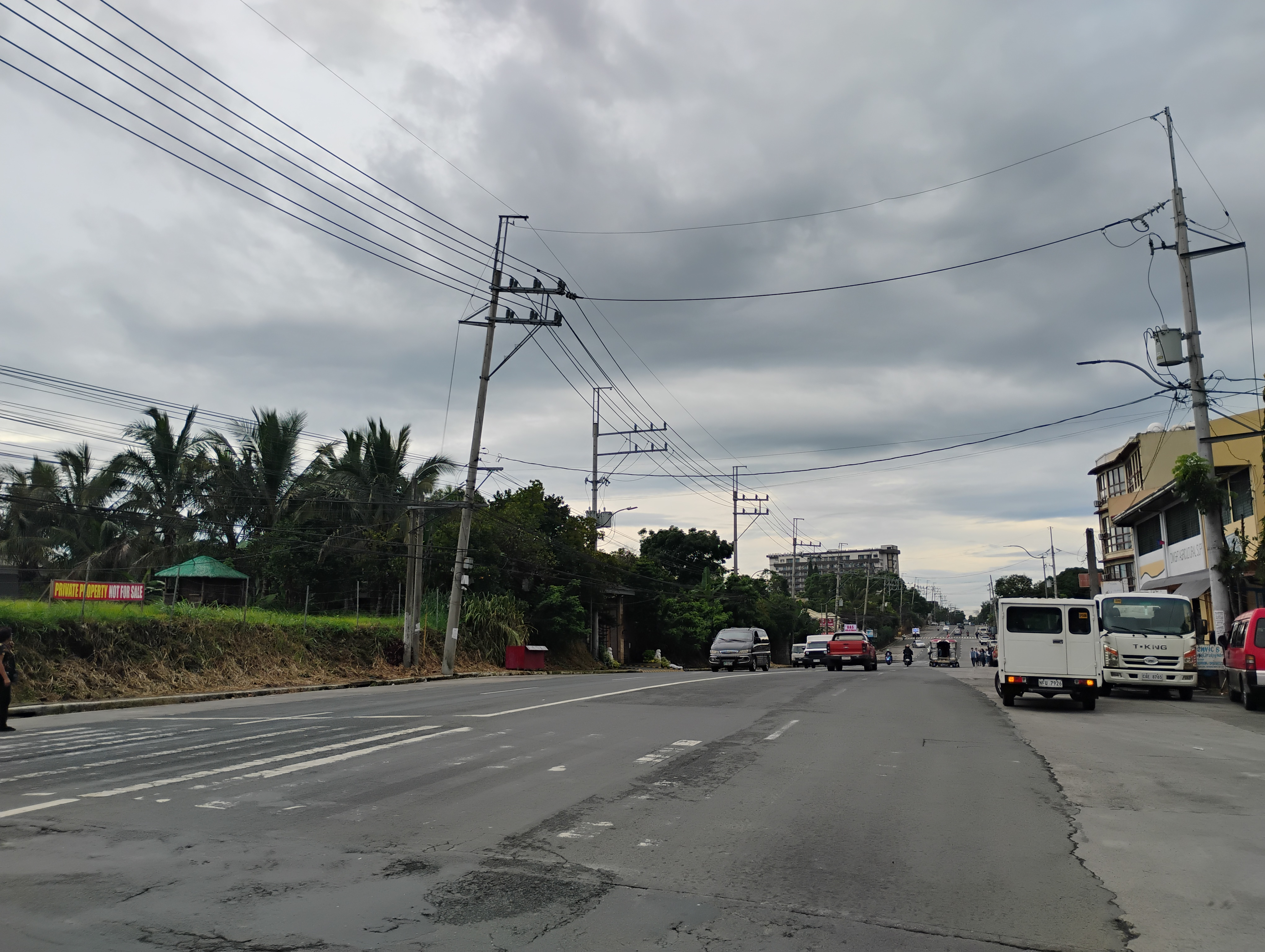
- Mahogany Avenue in 2025

Route information
- Maintained by Department of Public Works and Highways (DPWH) – Cavite 2nd District Engineering Office
- Length: 2.678 km (1.664 mi)

Major junctions
- East end: N410 (Tagaytay–Nasugbu Highway)
- West end: N410 (Tagaytay–Nasugbu Highway)

Location
- Country: Philippines
- Provinces: Cavite
- Major cities: Tagaytay

Highway system
- Roads in the Philippines; Highways; Expressways; List
← N411	→ N419

Mahogany Avenue, also known as the Mahogany Road and J. P. Rizal Street, is a 2.678-kilometer (1.664 mi) secondary road in Tagaytay, Philippines. It acts as an alternative route for the Tagaytay–Nasugbu Highway.

The entire road is designated as National Route 413 (N413) of the Philippine highway network.

The road is known for being the location of Mahogany Beef Market, which is famous for its bulalo.

== Intersections ==
The entire route is located in Tagaytay. Intersections are numbered by kilometer posts, with Rizal Park in Manila designated as kilometer zero.

km	mi	Destinations	Notes
58.010	36.046	N410 (Tagaytay–Nasugbu Highway)	Eastern terminus
		Crisanto Mendoza de los Reyes Avenue	
59.000	36.661	Tagaytay kilometer zero	
60.630	37.674	N410 (Tagaytay–Nasugbu Highway)	Western terminus
1.000 mi = 1.609 km; 1.000 km = 0.621 mi
