= Crisanto Mendoza de los Reyes Avenue =

Major road in Cavite, Philippines

Crisanto Mendoza de los Reyes Avenue
- General Trias–Amadeo–Tagaytay Road; Tejero-General Trias-Amadeo-Tagaytay Road; Governor Ferrer Drive
- The route alignment of Crisanto Mendoza Delos Reyes Avenue

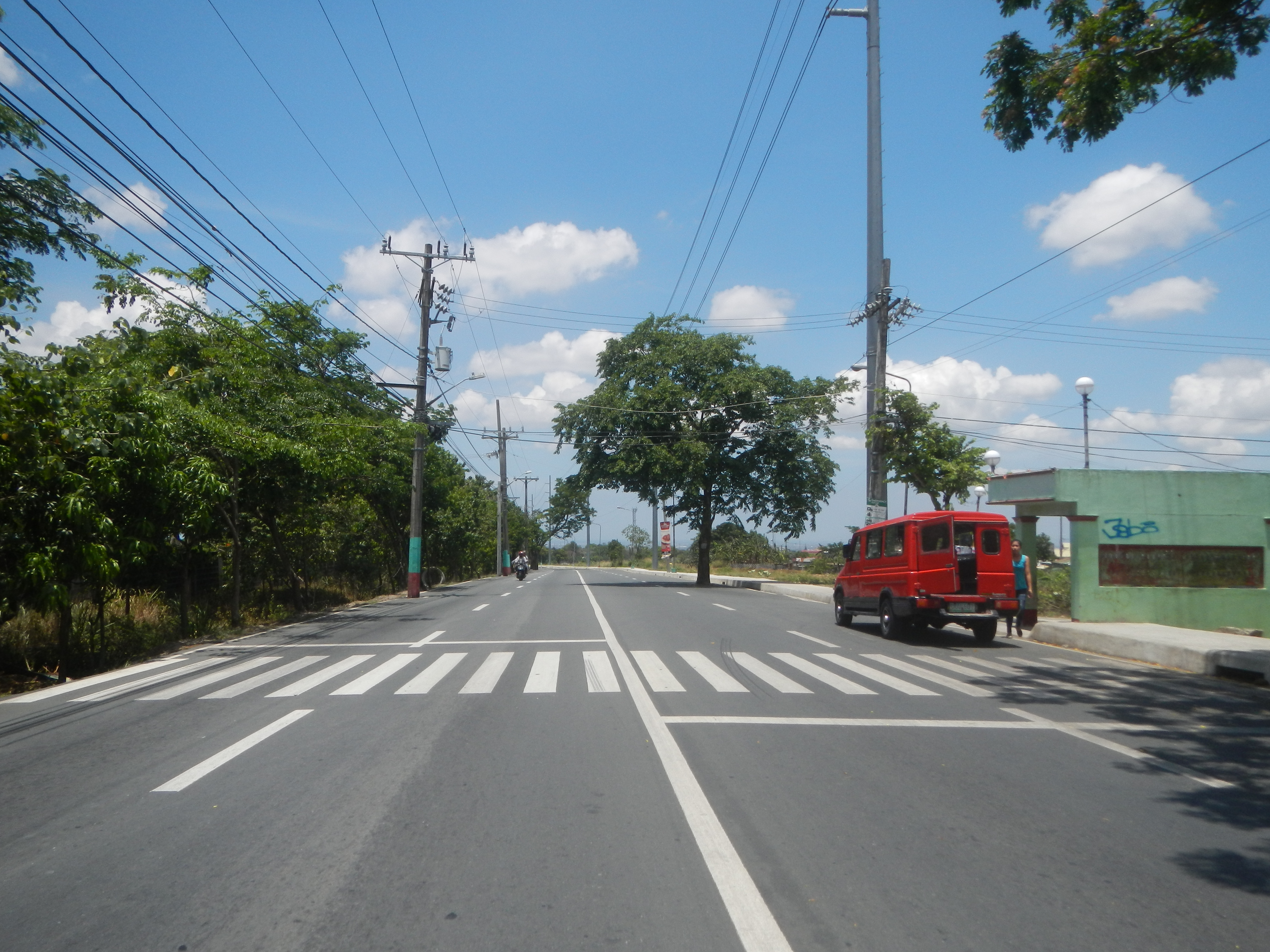
- The avenue in General Trias

Route information
- Maintained by the Department of Public Works and Highways
- Length: 36.7 km (22.8 mi)

Major junctions
- North end: N64 (Antero Soriano Highway) / N401 (General Trias Drive) in General Trias
- N65 (Governor's Drive); N413 (Mahogany Avenue) in Tagaytay
- South end: N410 (Tagaytay–Nasugbu Highway) in Tagaytay

Location
- Country: Philippines
- Major cities: General Trias, Tagaytay
- Towns: Amadeo

Highway system
- Roads in the Philippines; Highways; Expressways; List

Crisanto Mendoza de los Reyes Avenue, formerly known as the General Trias–Amadeo–Tagaytay Road and also known as Tejero-General Trias-Amadeo-Tagaytay Road, is a two-to-four lane, 36.7-kilometer (22.8 mi), tertiary highway traversing through the central towns and cities of the province of Cavite, Philippines. It connects the city of General Trias to the city of Tagaytay and acts as a secondary road for the Aguinaldo Highway.

Its stretch south of its intersection with Governor's Drive in Manggahan, General Trias, is legally named after Crisanto Mendoza de los Reyes, one of the heroes of the 1872 Cavite mutiny, since the passage of Republic Act No. 9476 in 2007. Its portions in General Trias, particularly north of Governor's Drive, are also alternatively known as General Trias Drive, Prinza Street, and Governor Ferrer Drive or Governor Luis Ferrer Drive, respectively.

== Route description ==
The northern terminus of the highway is at the Antero Soriano Highway in Barangay Tejero, General Trias as the southern continuation of N401 (General Trias Drive). From there, it takes the name General Trias Drive. It then turns south at the población as Prinza Street, Governor Ferrer Drive or Governor Luis Ferrer Drive until its intersection with Governor's Drive in Barangay Manggahan. It then proceeds Amadeo and ends at the Tagaytay–Nasugbu Highway in Tagaytay.

== History ==
Historically, the avenue, referred to as General Trias–Amadeo–Tagaytay Road, forms part of the old Route 323 or Highway 323. On May 22, 2007, its section from Governor's Drive at Manggahan Junction in General Trias to its southern terminus at Tagaytay–Nasugbu Road in Tagaytay was renamed Crisanto M. De Los Reyes Avenue by virtue of Republic Act No. 9476.

== Intersections ==
The entire route is located in Cavite. Intersections are numbered by kilometer post, with Rizal Park in Manila designated as Kilometer 0.

City/Municipality	km	mi	Destinations	Notes
General Trias	32	20	N64 (Antero Soriano Highway)	Northern terminus
General Trias	34	21	Arnaldo Highway	
General Trias	38	24	NIA Road	
General Trias	45	28	N65 (Governor's Drive)	Traffic light intersection
Amadeo	56	35	Silang–Banaybanay Road	Traffic light intersection
Amadeo	60	37	Amadeo Proper Junction	
Amadeo–Tagaytay boundary	65	40	Cavite [1st] District Engineering Office–Cavite 2nd District Engineering Office highway boundary	
Tagaytay	68	42	N413 (Mahogany Avenue)	
Tagaytay	68	42	N410 (Tagaytay–Nasugbu Highway)	Southern terminus
1.000 mi = 1.609 km; 1.000 km = 0.621 mi
