= Santa Rosa–Tagaytay Road =

Thoroughfare in the Philippines

Santa Rosa–Tagaytay Road
- Tagaytay–Santa Rosa Road; Santa Rosa–Ulat–Tagaytay Road
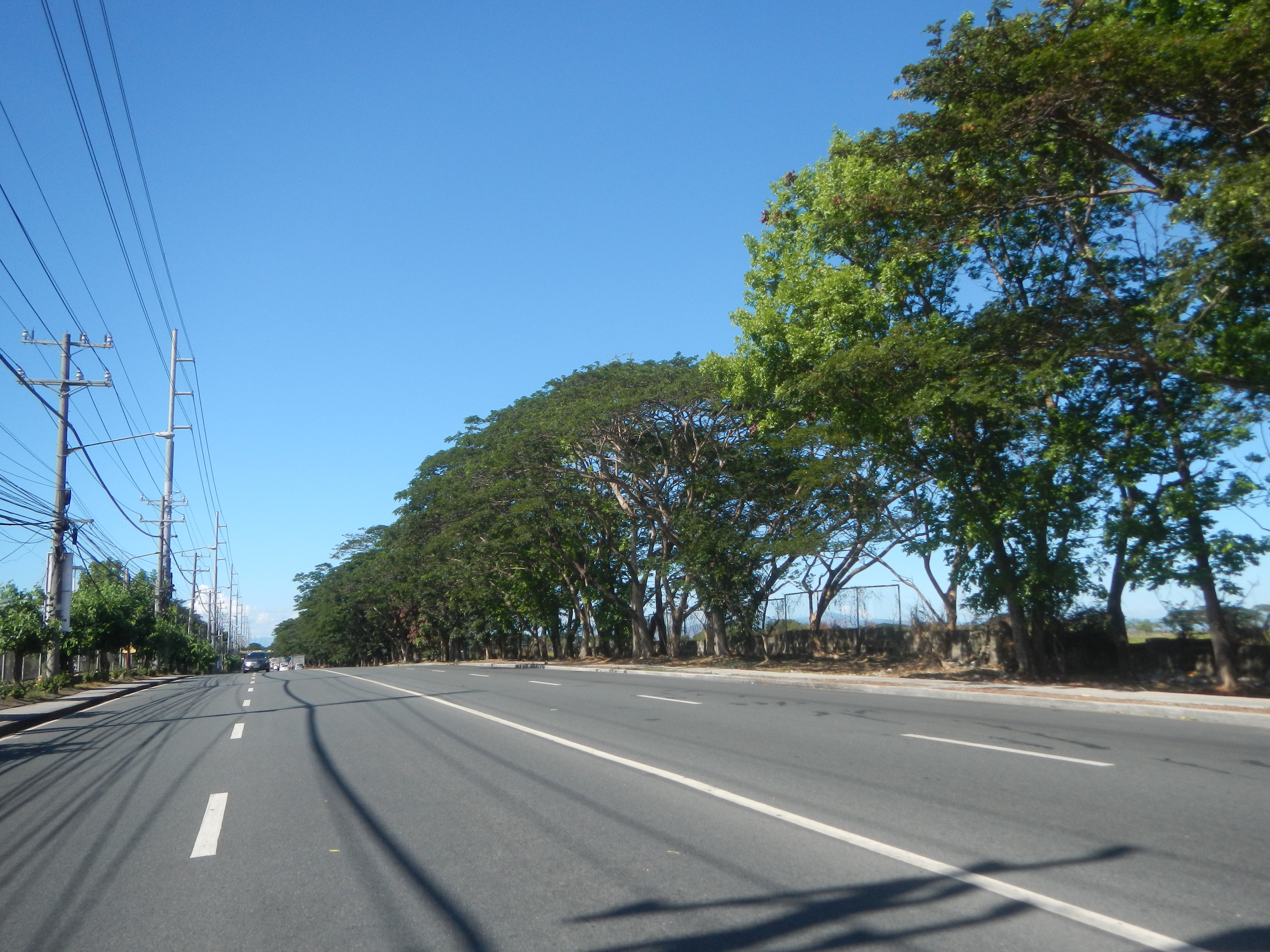
- A segment of the road in Santa Rosa, Laguna

Route information
- Maintained by the Department of Public Works and Highways – Cavite 2nd District Engineering Office, Cavite 3rd District Engineering Office, and Laguna 2nd District Engineering Office
- Length: 23.245 km (14.444 mi)
- Existed: 1990s–present
- Component highways: N420

Major junctions
- Northeast end: N1 (Manila South Road) in Santa Rosa
- AH26 (South Luzon Expressway) in Santa Rosa
- Southwest end: N421 (Tagaytay–Calamba Road) in Tagaytay

Location
- Country: Philippines
- Provinces: Laguna and Cavite
- Major cities: Santa Rosa and Tagaytay
- Towns: Silang

Highway system
- Roads in the Philippines; Highways; Expressways; List
← N419	→ N421

The Santa Rosa–Tagaytay Road, also known as the Tagaytay–Santa Rosa Road and the Santa Rosa–Ulat–Tagaytay Road, is a 23.245-kilometer (14.444 mi) major thoroughfare in the provinces of Laguna and Cavite, Philippines. Originally an old road linking the Santa Rosa municipal proper to the western edge of the then-municipality at barangay Santo Domingo and narrowly onto barangay Lumil in Silang, the highway was constructed in the late 1990s.

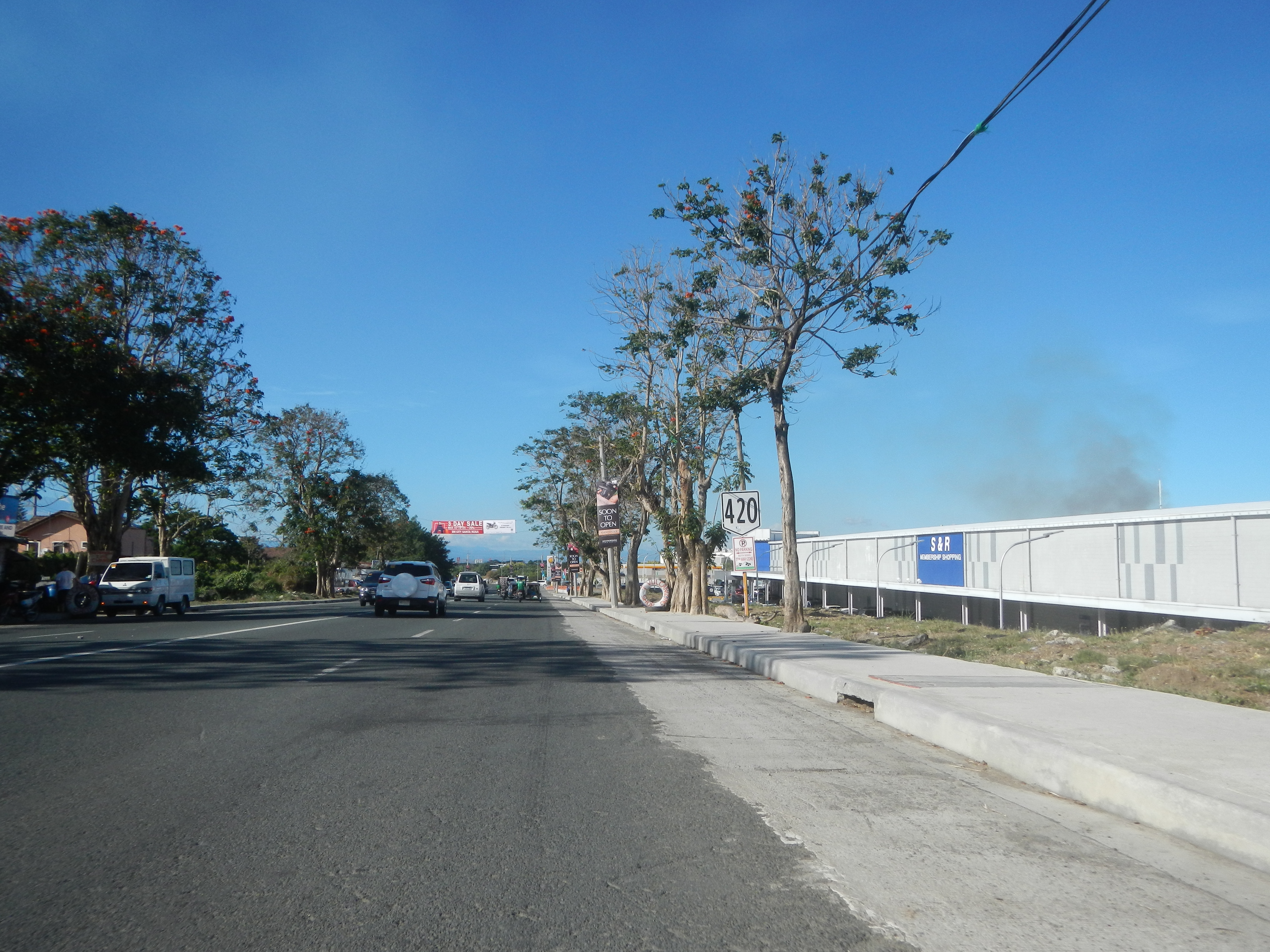
The highway with the N420 reassurance marker in Nuvali, Santa Rosa

It connects the cities of Santa Rosa and Tagaytay in the provinces of Laguna and Cavite, respectively, and provides access to and from Manila via South Luzon Expressway and Cavite–Laguna Expressway. Its segment in Barangay Balibago, Santa Rosa is also known as Felix Reyes Street (F. Reyes Street) and Balibago Road.

The entire road is a component of National Route 420 (N420) of the Philippine highway network.

== Intersections ==
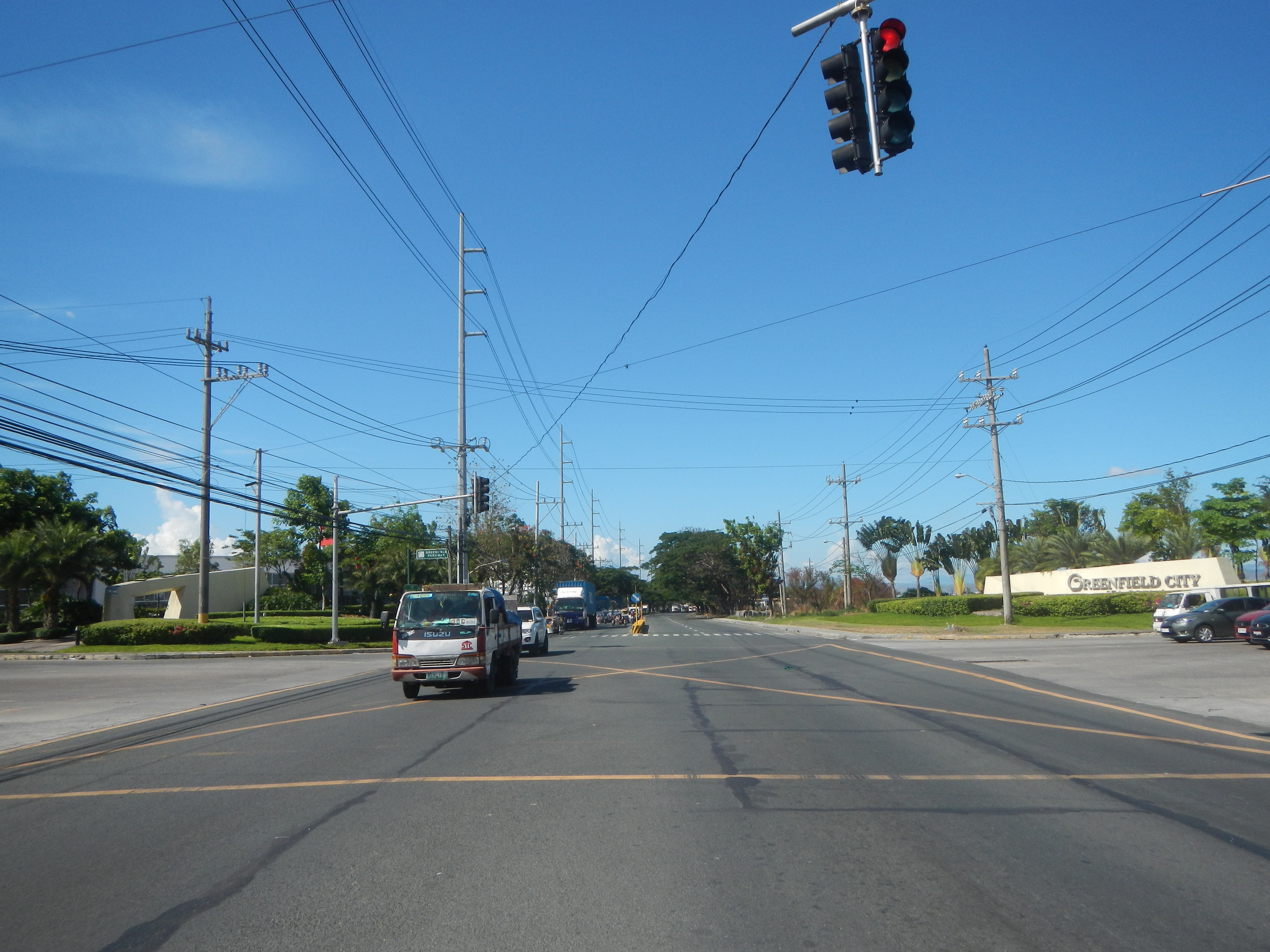
Intersection of Santa Rosa–Tagaytay Road and Greenfield Parkway in Santa Rosa

Intersections are numbered by kilometer post, with Rizal Park in Manila designated as Kilometer 0.

Province	City/Municipality	km	mi	Destinations	Notes
Laguna	Santa Rosa			N1 (Manila South Road)	Northern terminus; continues to the east as Rizal Boulevard
Laguna	Santa Rosa			Pearl Road	Access to Santa Rosa Commercial Complex
Laguna	Santa Rosa			Turquoise Road / Talegra Street	Access to Santa Rosa Commercial Complex
Laguna	Santa Rosa			RSBS Boulevard (San Lorenzo Road)	Traffic light intersection; access to Enchanted Kingdom and San Lorenzo South village
Laguna	Santa Rosa	41	25	AH26 (SLEX) – Batangas, Manila	Partial cloverleaf or folded diamond interchange with traffic light intersections. Crosses the South Luzon Expressway as a bridge with access via Santa Rosa Exit.
Laguna	Santa Rosa			NMPI Road	
Laguna	Santa Rosa	42.899	26.656	Aratan Bridge	
Laguna	Santa Rosa	44	27	BelAir Drive / Rodeo Drive	Traffic light intersection; access to Laguna BelAir subdivision
Laguna	Santa Rosa	45	28	Greenfield Parkway	Traffic light intersection
Laguna	Santa Rosa	46	29	Laguna Boulevard	Traffic light intersection
Laguna	Santa Rosa			San Bruno Drive	Traffic light intersection; alternative access to Greenfield City and Eton City
Laguna	Santa Rosa			Grasslands Drive	One-way access road into Greenfield City with limited opening hours
Laguna	Santa Rosa	47	29		Access to Sta. Elena City
Laguna	Santa Rosa			Nuvali Boulevard	Traffic light intersection
Laguna	Santa Rosa			Evoliving Center Drive	
Laguna	Santa Rosa			West Nature Avenue	
Laguna	Santa Rosa			E3 (CALAX) – Mamplasan, Kawit	Traffic light intersection; Sta. Rosa City Exit of CALAX
Laguna-Cavite boundary	Santa Rosa-Silang boundary			Laguna 2nd District Engineering Office–Cavite 2nd District Engineering Office highway boundary	
Cavite	Silang	68.495	42.561	Tartaria Bridge	
Cavite	Silang			Pook	
Cavite	Silang			Hoyo Road	
Cavite	Tagaytay			Pulong Bunga / Kaykulot Road	
Cavite	Tagaytay			Lagusan Drive	Traffic light intersection.
Cavite	Tagaytay			N421 (Tagaytay–Calamba Road) – Tagaytay, Nasugbu, Calamba	Southern terminus
1.000 mi = 1.609 km; 1.000 km = 0.621 mi: Incomplete access

== Landmarks ==
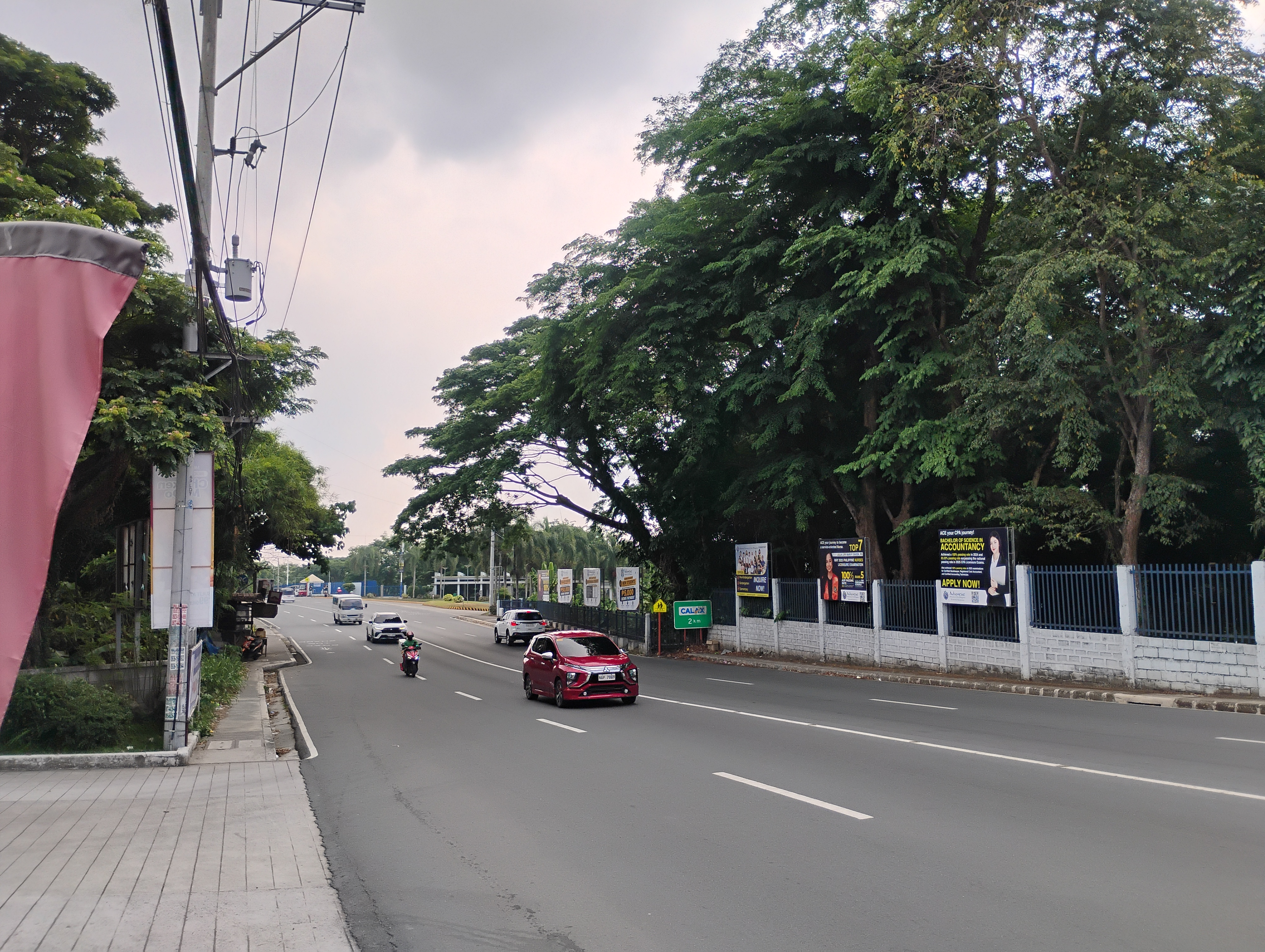
Adventist University of the Philippines campus along the highway

From east to west:

- Nuvali
  - Ayala Malls Nuvali
  - SM Nuvali
- Cuartel de Santo Domingo
- Adventist University of the Philippines
- Philippine National Police Academy
