= Laurel, Batangas =

Municipality in Batangas, Philippines

Laurel
- Municipality
- Municipality of Laurel
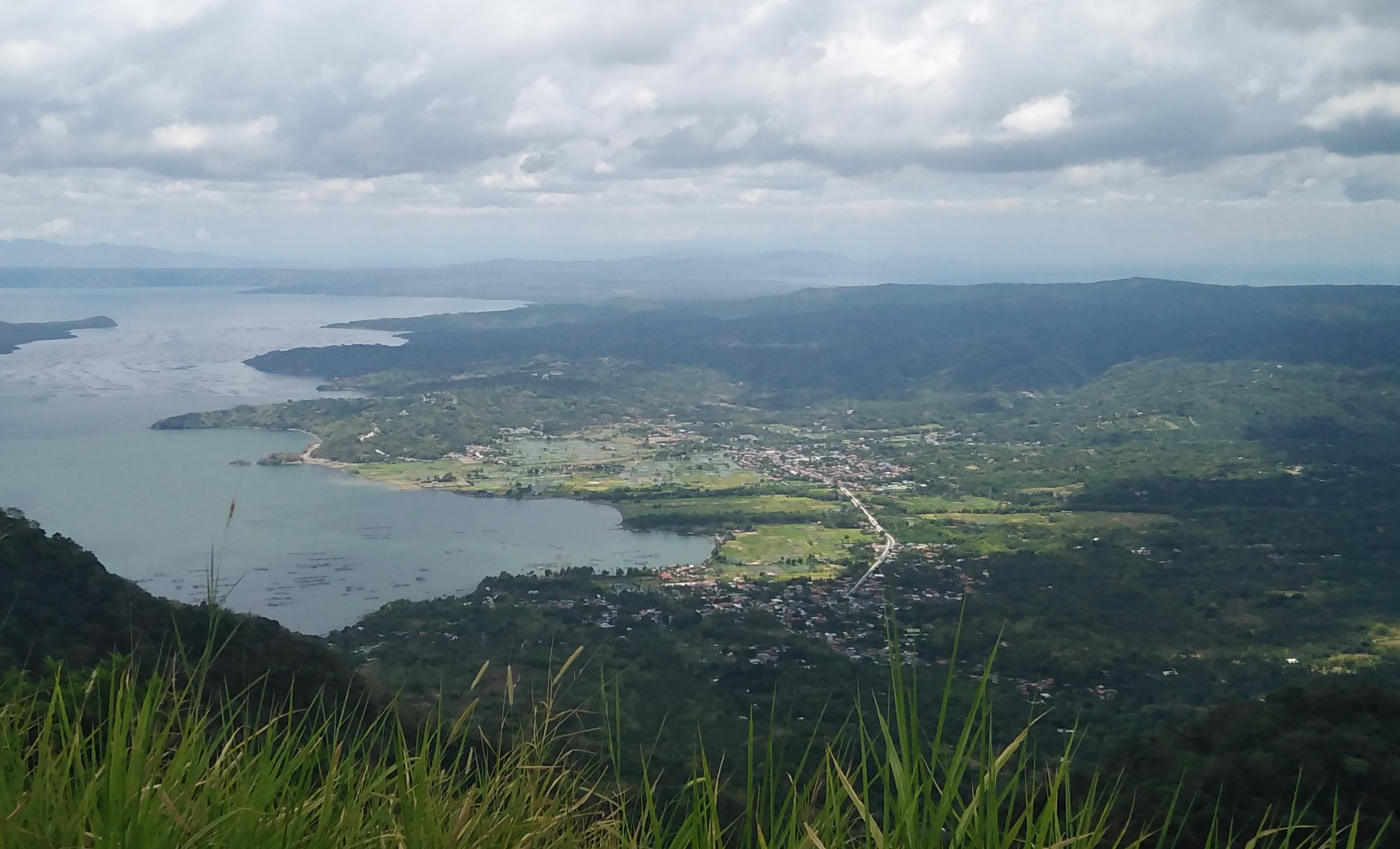
- View of Laurel from Sky Ranch Tagaytay

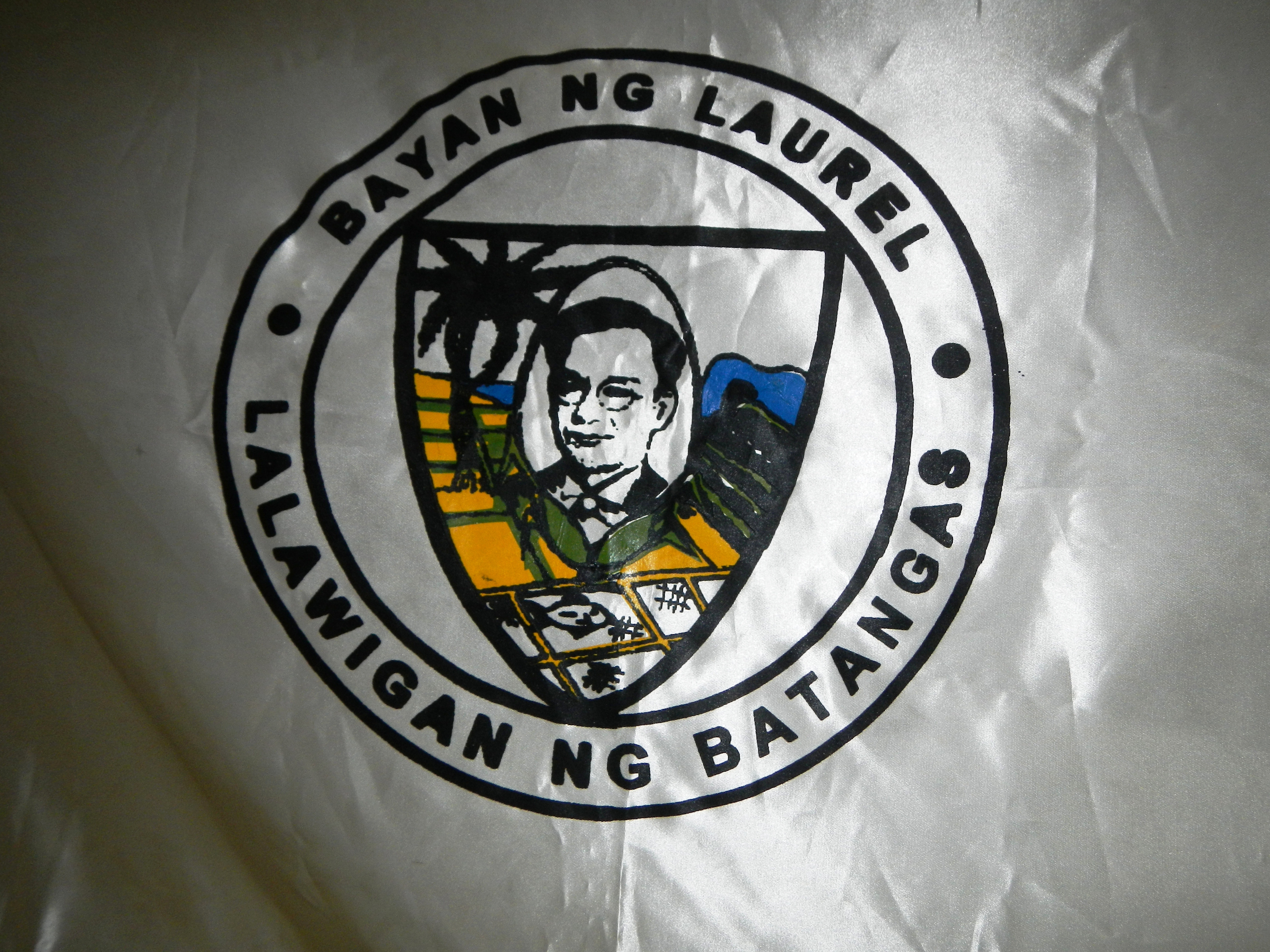
- Flag Seal
- Motto(s): Bagong Laurel, Maunlad!
- Map of Batangas with Laurel highlighted
- Interactive map of Laurel
- Location within the Philippines
- Coordinates: 14°03′01″N 120°55′56″E
- Country: Philippines
- Region: Calabarzon
- Province: Batangas
- District: 3rd district
- Founded: June 21, 1969
- Named for: Miguel and Jose P. Laurel
- Barangays: 21 (see Barangays)

Government
  - Type: Sangguniang Bayan
  - Mayor: Lyndon M. Bruce
  - Vice Mayor: Brandon M. Bruce
  - Representative: King George Leandro Antonio V. Collantes
  - Municipal Council: Members: Sylvia E. Austria; Angelito M. Rodriguez; Iris Joyce A. Agojo; Francisco U. Endozo; Leizl S. de Castro; Norvic M. Garcia; Regina E. Landicho; Romulo P. Macaraig
  - Electorate: 28,925 voters (2025)

Area
  - Total: 71.29 km^{2} (27.53 sq mi)
- Elevation: 293 m (961 ft)
- Highest elevation: 699 m (2,293 ft)
- Lowest elevation: 5 m (16 ft)

Population (2024 census)
  - Total: 44,791
  - Density: 628.3/km^{2} (1,627/sq mi)
  - Households: 9,626

Economy
  - Income class: 2nd municipal income class
  - Poverty incidence: 9.81% (2023)
  - Revenue: ₱ 222.6 million (2024)
  - Assets: ₱ 893.7 million (2024)
  - Expenditure: ₱ 141.8 million (2024)
  - Liabilities: ₱ 229.8 million (2024)

Service provider
  - Electricity: Batangas 2 Electric Cooperative (BATELEC 2)
- Time zone: UTC+8 (PST)
- ZIP code: 4221
- PSGC: 0401011000
- IDD : area code: +63 (0)43
- Native languages: Tagalog
- Website: laurelbatangas.gov.ph

Laurel, officially the Municipality of Laurel (Tagalog: Bayan ng Laurel), is a municipality in the province of Batangas, Philippines. According to the 2024 census, it has a population of 44,791 people.

== Etymology ==
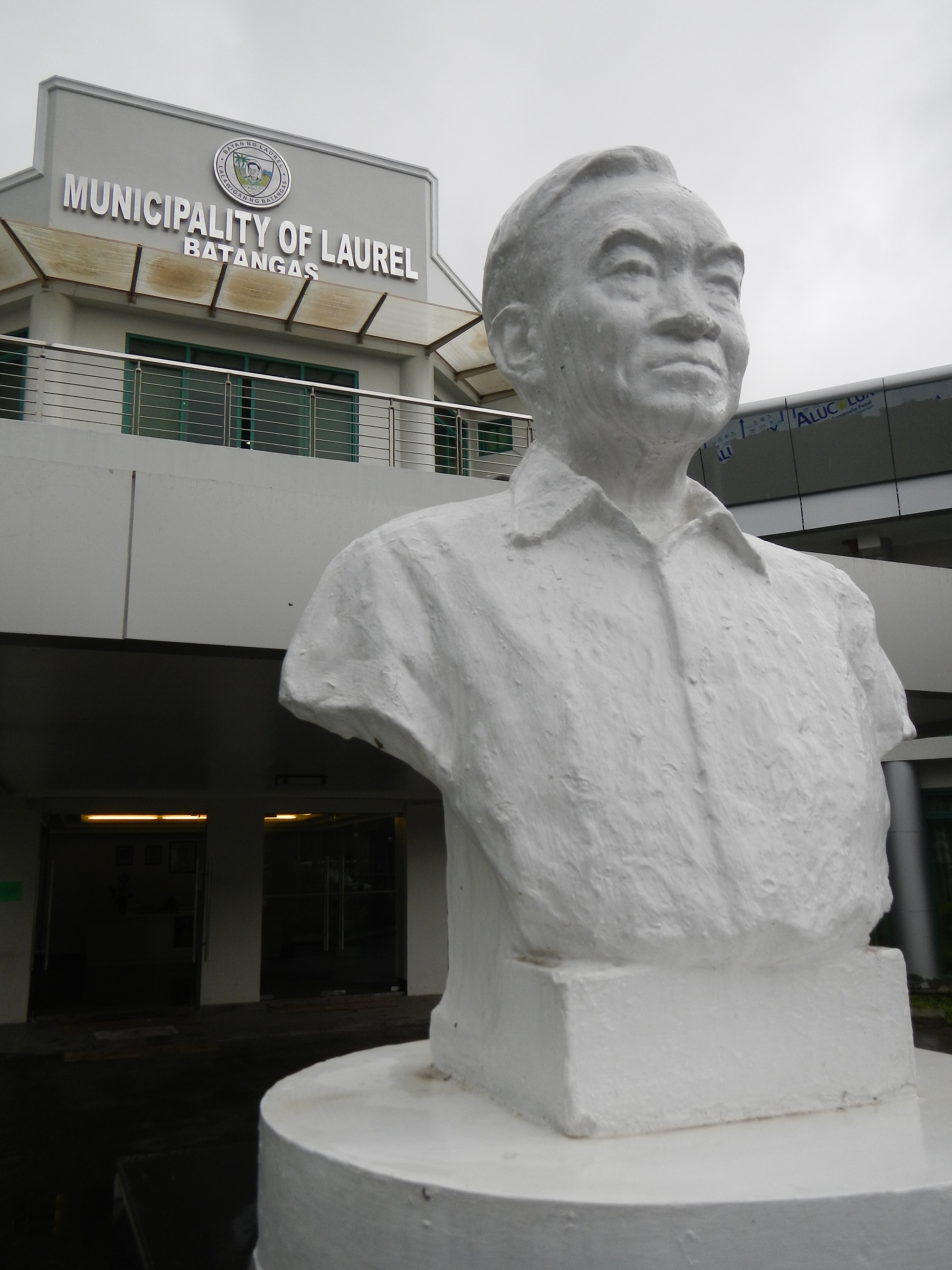
Bust of José P. Laurel in front of the Laurel Municipal Hall

The town's present name is derived from Miguel Laurel, known as the first notable Laurel in the Philippines and a longtime patriarch of the place and José P. Laurel, a native of Tanauan, Batangas who served as the president of the Second Philippine Republic.

== History ==
Laurel traces its origin to a remote barrio called Bugain (derived from buga, a black scoria formed from ejected tephra during eruptions of Taal), which was part of Talisay that was established in 1869. Located by the Tanauan Bay, the present-day municipality was also the first location of Tanauan's municipal seat (poblacion) until 1754, when it was transferred to the present-day barangay Sala in Tanauan as a result of the Taal Volcano eruption that year. In 1903, the barrio became part of Tanauan following its merger with Talisay, to which it had belonged, by virtue of Act No. 708. A year later, it was transferred to Taal by virtue of Act No. 1244, before it was eventually returned to the reestablished municipality of Talisay. After the 1911 Taal Volcano eruption, population grew at the area with agricultural cultivation as the locals' primary livelihood. The area was later called Nayon ng Bayuyungan (derived from bayong) or simply as Bayuyungan and was designated as the center of the area that consisted it and nearby barrios. The present-day barangay Berinayan was also annexed to Tagaytay in Cavite from the 1940s to 1956, when it was returned to Talisay.

Laurel had been part of Talisay, its current neighbor town, until 1969. Locals led by Jose Macaraig, Placido Amo (vice mayor of Talisay), and Severino Amo signed a petition to create an independent town out of barrio Bayuyungan and adjacent barrios. It was first endorsed to Senator Maria Kalaw Katigbak, who in turn presented it to President Diosdado Macapagal. It was also presented to the Talisay municipal government, who in turn forwarded it to Batangas Governor Feliciano Leviste. The Batangas Provincial Board then endorsed the petition as a resolution to Batangas 3rd district Representative José Laurel Jr. and finally through House Bill No. 17628.

On June 21, 1969, the barrios of Bayuyungan, Ticub, Balakilong, Bugaan, Berinayan, As-is, San Gabriel, and Buso-buso were officially separated from Talisay and constituted into a separate municipality of Laurel, by virtue of Republic Act No. 5689. Bayuyungan became the present-day poblacion. The first set of officials acted on November 8, 1971, with Placido Amo as Mayor.

== Geography ==
Laurel is located at 14°03′01″N 120°55′56″E.

According to the Philippine Statistics Authority, the municipality has a land area of 71.29 square kilometers (27.53 sq mi) constituting 2.29% of the 3,119.75-square-kilometer (1,204.54 sq mi) total area of Batangas.

Laurel is 70 kilometers (43 mi) from Batangas City and 93 kilometers (58 mi) from Manila.

=== Barangays ===
Laurel is politically subdivided into 21 barangays, as shown in the matrix below. Each barangay consists of puroks and some have sitios.

PSGC	Barangay	Population			±% p.a.	
		2024		2010		
041011001	As‑Is	5.3%	2,354	2,133	▴	0.69%
041011002	Balakilong	9.2%	4,118	3,974	▴	0.25%
041011004	Berinayan	4.5%	2,008	1,613	▴	1.53%
041011006	Bugaan East	4.5%	2,028	1,811	▴	0.79%
041011007	Bugaan West	5.3%	2,374	2,290	▴	0.25%
041011008	Buso‑buso	6.0%	2,692	2,445	▴	0.67%
041011010	Dayap Itaas	1.7%	752	494	▴	2.96%
041011011	Gulod	6.1%	2,746	2,501	▴	0.65%
041011012	J. Leviste	5.2%	2,351	1,884	▴	1.55%
041011013	Molinete	3.3%	1,480	1,442	▴	0.18%
041011014	Niyugan	2.7%	1,219	1,252	▾	−0.19%
041011015	Paliparan	2.0%	887	760	▴	1.08%
041011016	Barangay 1 (Poblacion)	1.3%	570	507	▴	0.82%
041011017	Barangay 2 (Poblacion)	3.2%	1,438	1,265	▴	0.89%
041011018	Barangay 3 (Poblacion)	1.5%	663	759	▾	−0.93%
041011019	Barangay 4 (Poblacion)	1.4%	610	593	▴	0.20%
041011020	Barangay 5 (Poblacion)	1.8%	790	674	▴	1.11%
041011021	San Gabriel	5.7%	2,559	2,340	▴	0.62%
041011022	San Gregorio	7.7%	3,433	2,931	▴	1.10%
041011023	Santa Maria	4.9%	2,217	1,986	▴	0.77%
041011024	Ticub	4.8%	2,155	2,020	▴	0.45%
	Total		44,791	35,674	▴	1.59%

=== Climate ===
Climate data for Ibaan, Batangas
Month	Jan	Feb	Mar	Apr	May	Jun	Jul	Aug	Sep	Oct	Nov	Dec	Year
Mean daily maximum °C (°F)	28 (82)	29 (84)	31 (88)	32 (90)	31 (88)	30 (86)	29 (84)	28 (82)	28 (82)	29 (84)	29 (84)	28 (82)	29 (85)
Mean daily minimum °C (°F)	19 (66)	19 (66)	20 (68)	22 (72)	24 (75)	24 (75)	24 (75)	24 (75)	24 (75)	23 (73)	21 (70)	20 (68)	22 (72)
Average precipitation mm (inches)	11 (0.4)	13 (0.5)	14 (0.6)	32 (1.3)	101 (4.0)	142 (5.6)	208 (8.2)	187 (7.4)	175 (6.9)	131 (5.2)	68 (2.7)	39 (1.5)	1,121 (44.3)
Average rainy days	5.2	5.0	7.4	11.5	19.8	23.5	27.0	25.9	25.2	23.2	15.5	8.3	197.5
Source: Meteoblue

== Demographics ==
Population census of Laurel
Year	Pop.	±% p.a.
1970	13,137	—
1975	15,143	+2.89%
1980	17,889	+3.39%
1990	22,099	+2.14%
1995	23,781	+1.38%
2000	27,604	+3.25%
2007	34,953	+3.31%
2010	35,674	+0.75%
2015	39,444	+1.93%
2020	43,210	+1.94%
2024	44,791	+0.87%
Source: Philippine Statistics Authority

In the 2024 census, Laurel had a population of 44,791 people. The population density was 630 inhabitants per square kilometer (1,600/sq mi).

== Economy ==
Poverty incidence of Laurel (%)

Source: Philippine Statistics Authority

- Fishing – Laurel's main economical source is fish culture in Taal Lake where most of local residents base their trade.
- Farming – Small rice paddies on the foothills of Taal canyon ridge provide for ricefields to farmers.
- Real estate – The town's vast land resource provide ideal location for real estate developers such as Megaworld and Fil-Estate which are mostly based in Metro Manila. Among the major real estate subdivisions located in Barangay San Gregorio are Canyon Woods and Twin Lakes.

== Government ==
=== Local government ===
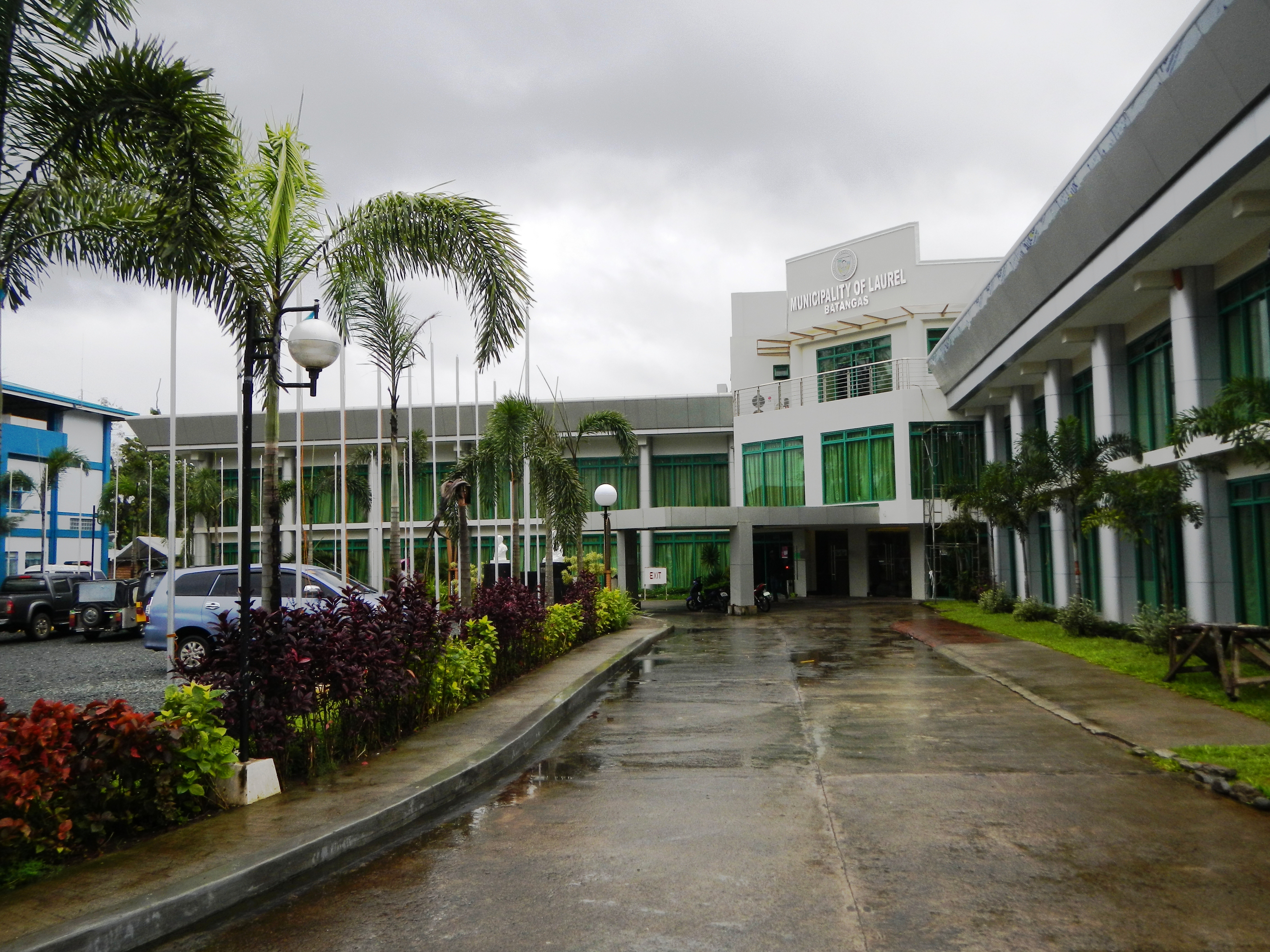
Municipal hall

Like other municipalities in the Philippines, Laurel is governed by a mayor and vice mayor who are elected to three-year terms. The mayor is the executive head who leads the municipal's departments in the execution of municipal ordinances and in the delivery of public services. The vice mayor heads a legislative council that is composed of 10 members: 8 elected councilors and 2 ex officio office held by the ABC President as the barangay sector representative and by the SK Federation President. The council is in charge of creating the minucipal's policies in the form of ordinances and resolutions.

=== List of mayors of Laurel ===
Former Municipal Mayors
No.	Name	Term of Office
1	Placido T. Amo	1969-1986
2	Atty. Natalio Panganiban	1986-1988
3 (1)	Placido T. Amo	1988-1992
4	Joven de Grano	1992-1995
5 (2)	Atty. Natalio Panganiban	1995-2004
6	John Benedict Panganiban	2004-2010
7	Randy James E. Amo	2010-2019
8	Joan L. Amo	2019-2022

== Education ==
The Laurel Schools District Office governs all educational institutions within the municipality. It oversees the management and operations of all private and public, from primary to secondary schools.

=== Primary and elementary schools ===
- Academia De Mayuga
- As-Is Elementary School
- Berinayan Elementary School
- Bignay Primary School
- Bugaan Integrated School
- Buso-Buso Elementary School
- Dofli School
- Gulod Elementary School
- Laurel Central School
- Leviste Elementary School
- Martin Esperanza Elementary School
- Molinete Elementary School
- Niyugan Elementary School
- Paliparan Elementary School
- Pantay Elementary School
- San Gabriel Elementary School
- San Gregorio Elementary School (Annex)
- Servite Catholic School
- St. Clare Community Foundation School
- Sta. Maria Elementary School
- Ticub Elementary School
- Wrema Learning Center

=== Secondary schools ===
- Balakilong Integrated School
- Placido T. Amo Senior High School
- San Gregorio Integrated School

Bugaan Integrated School

- Wenceslao Trinidad Memorial National High School

=== Higher educational institution ===
- Colegio de Laurel

== Gallery ==
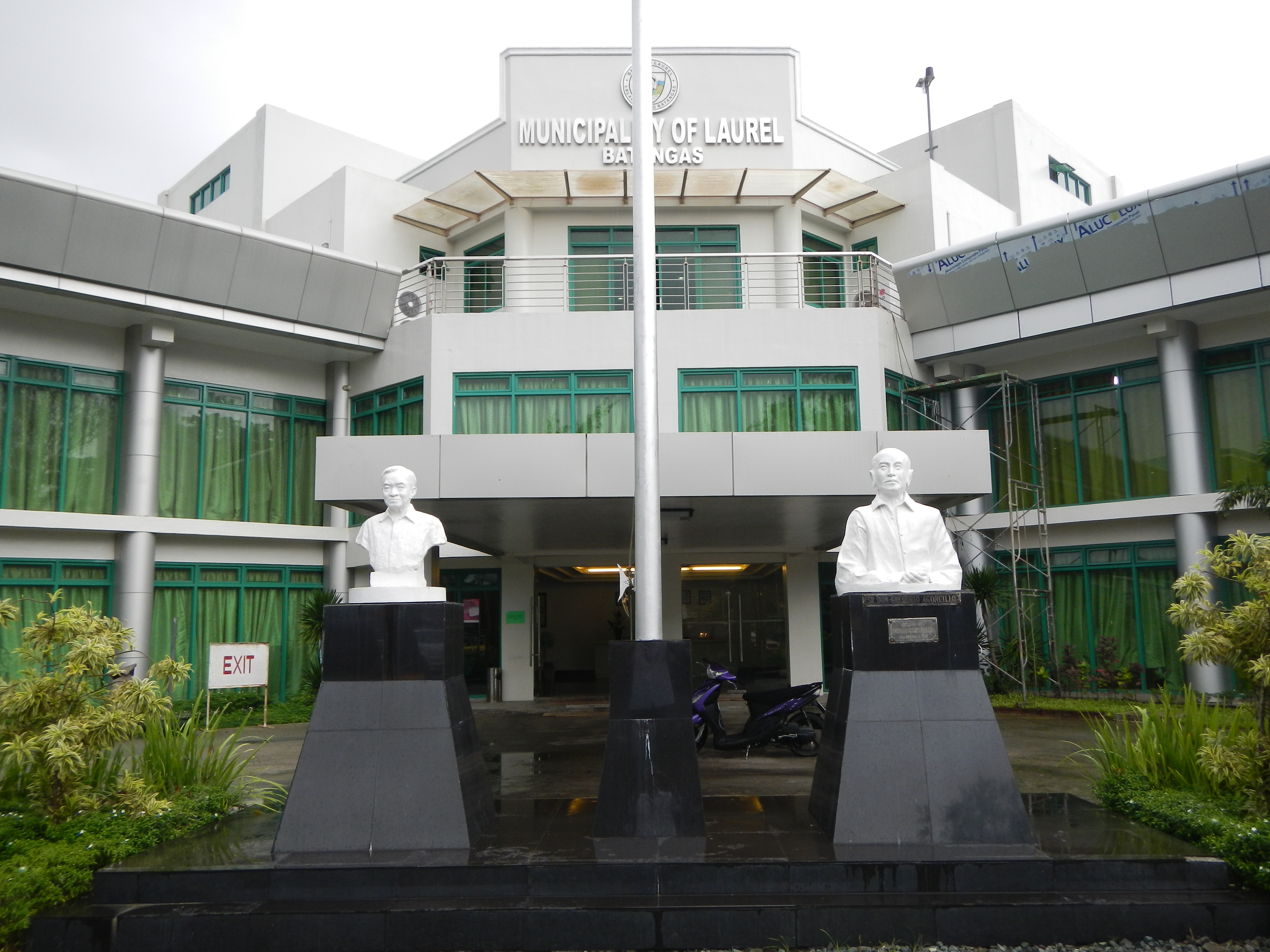
Laurel Municipal Hall

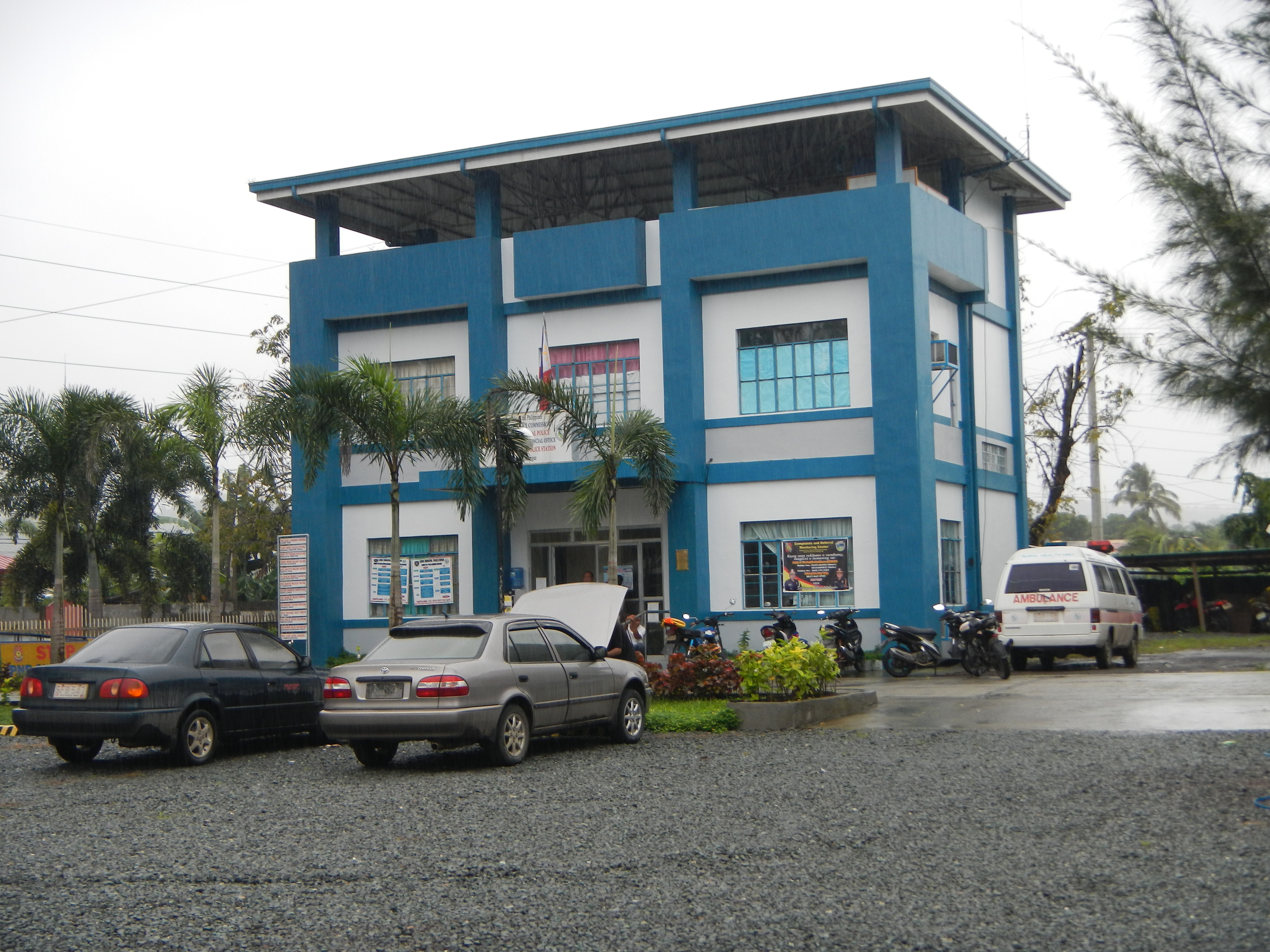
Laurel Police Station

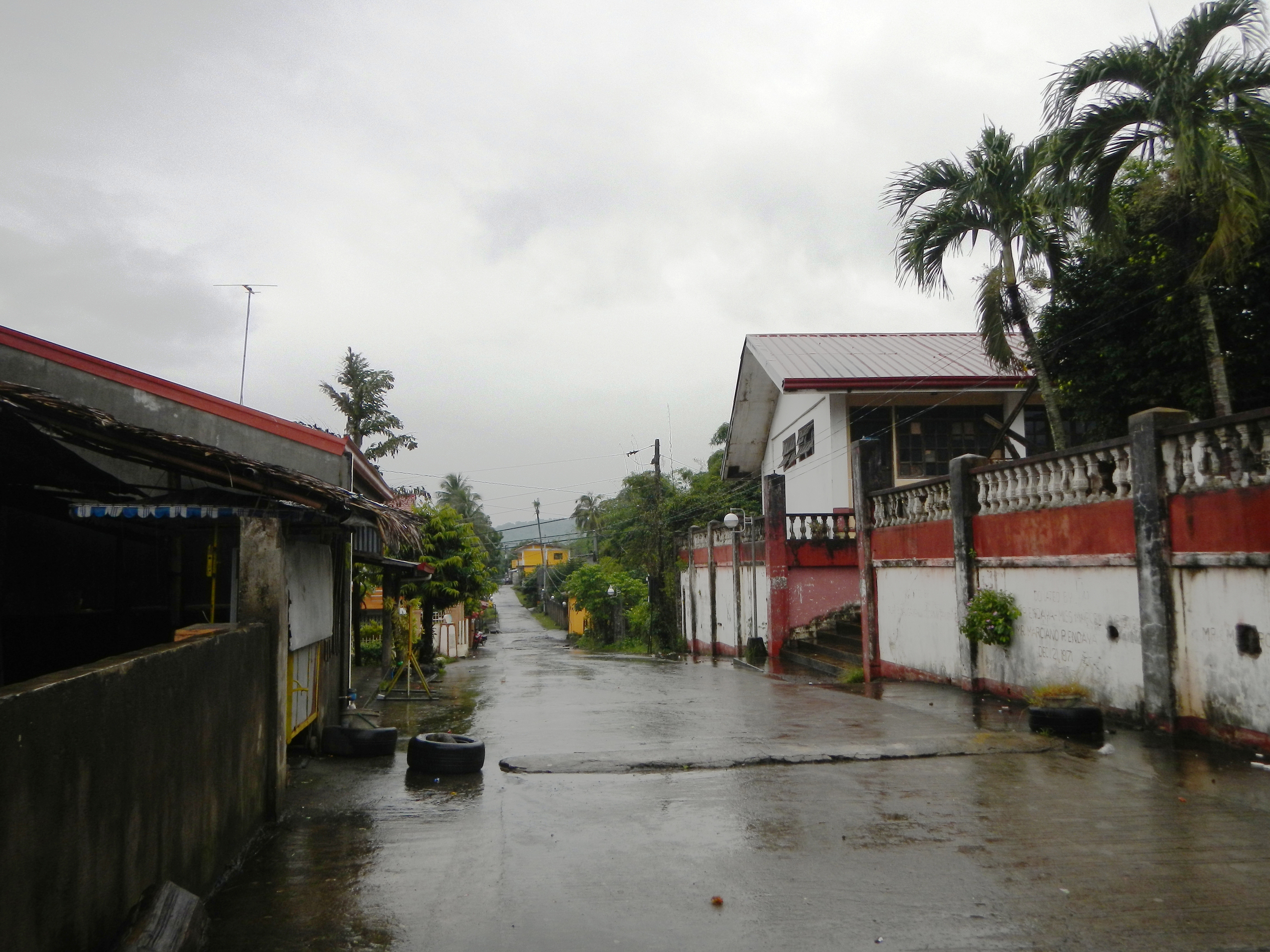
Street in Poblacion Laurel

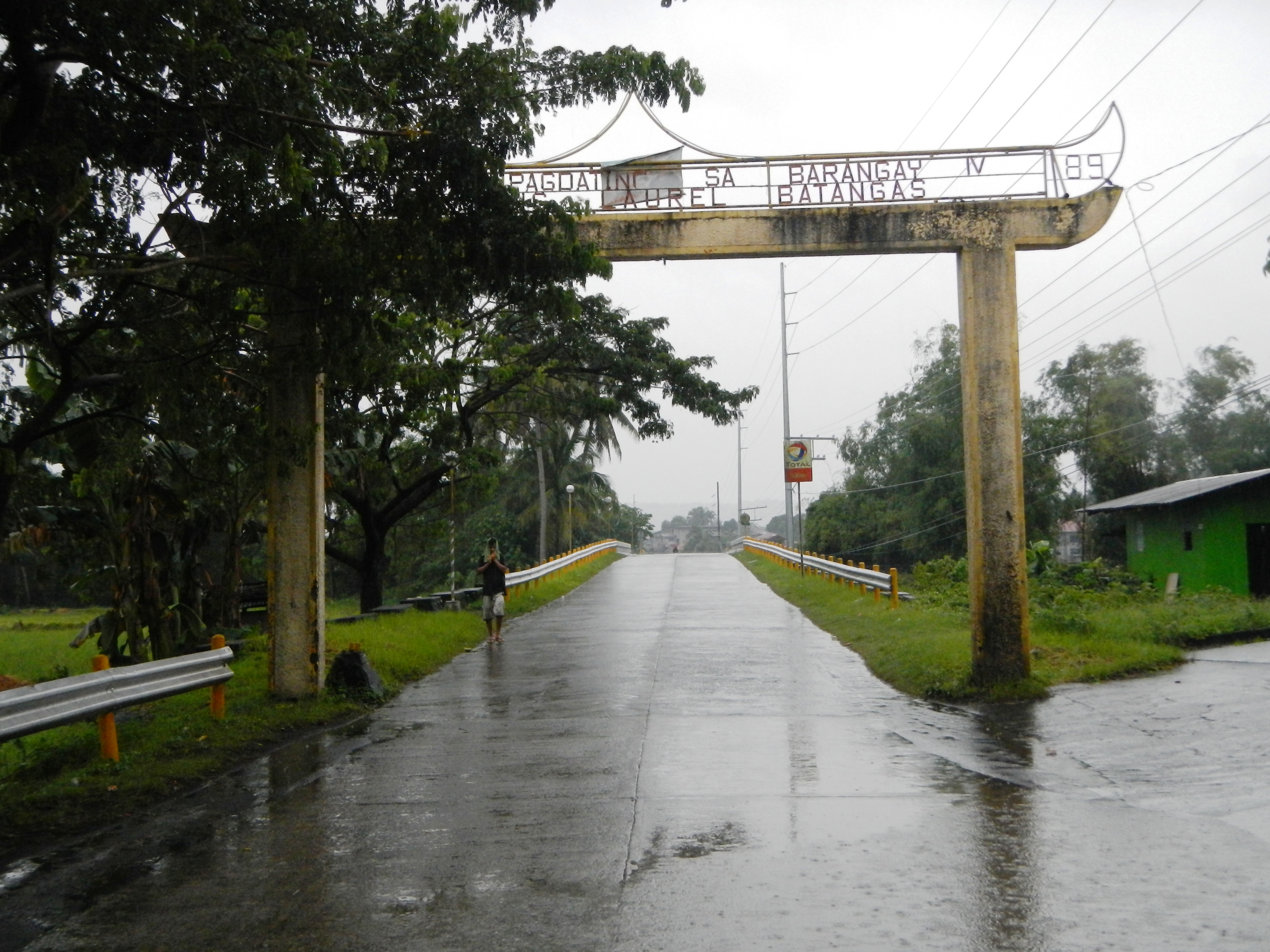
Laurel welcome arch

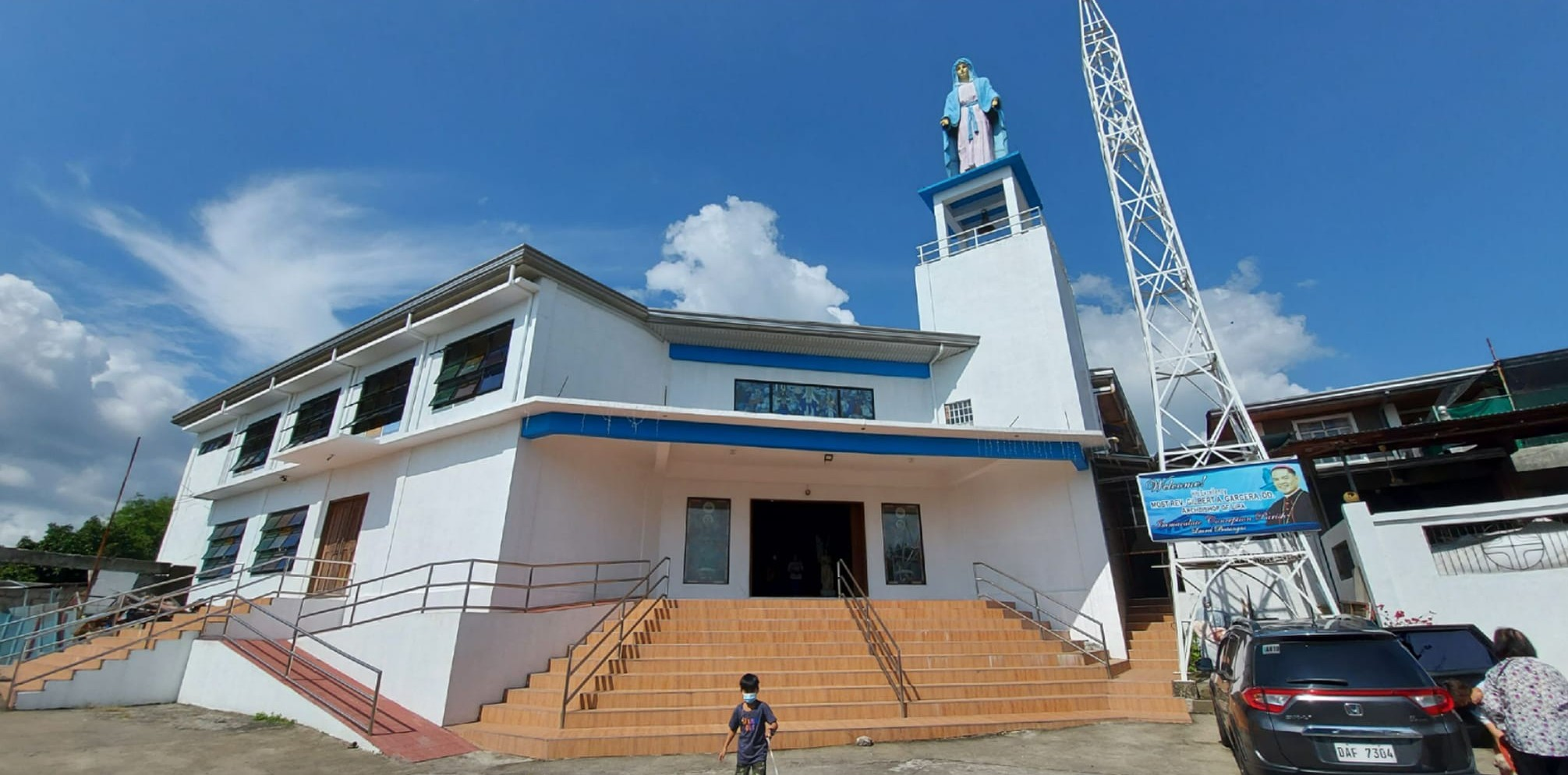
Laurel Church

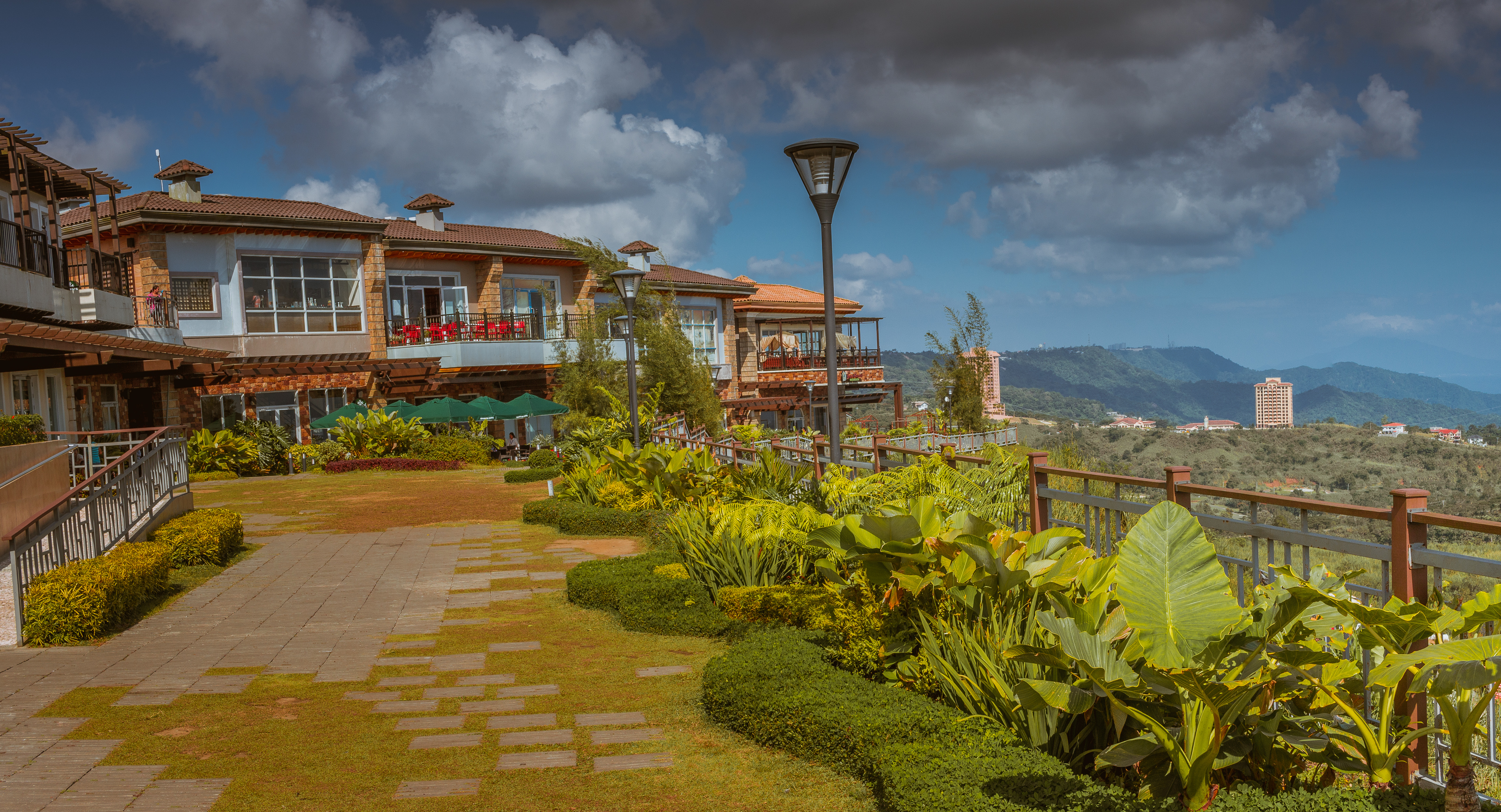
Twin Lakes shopping village
