= Talisay, Batangas =

Municipality in Batangas, Philippines

Talisay
- Municipality
- Municipality of Talisay
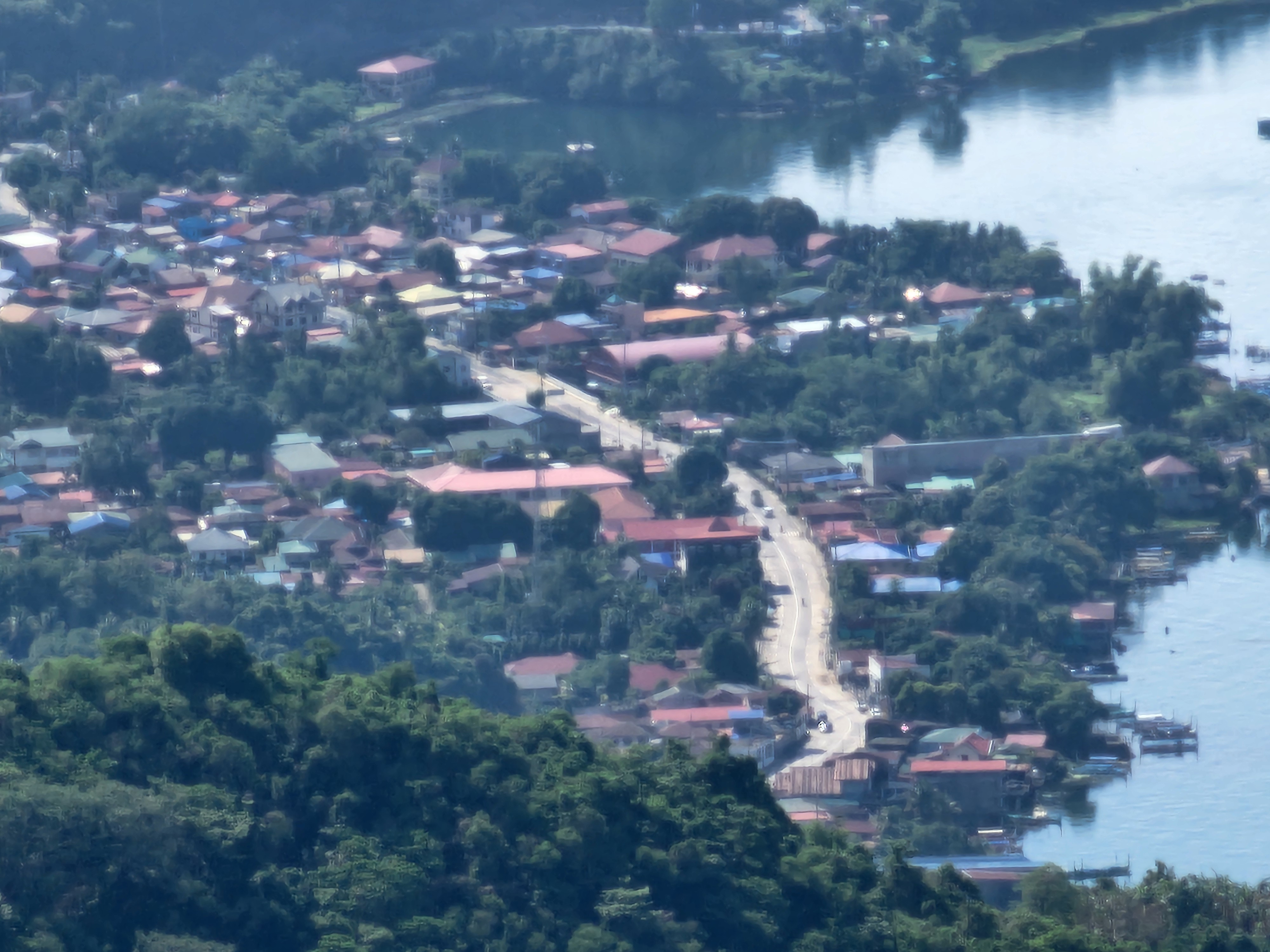
- Aerial view from Tagaytay

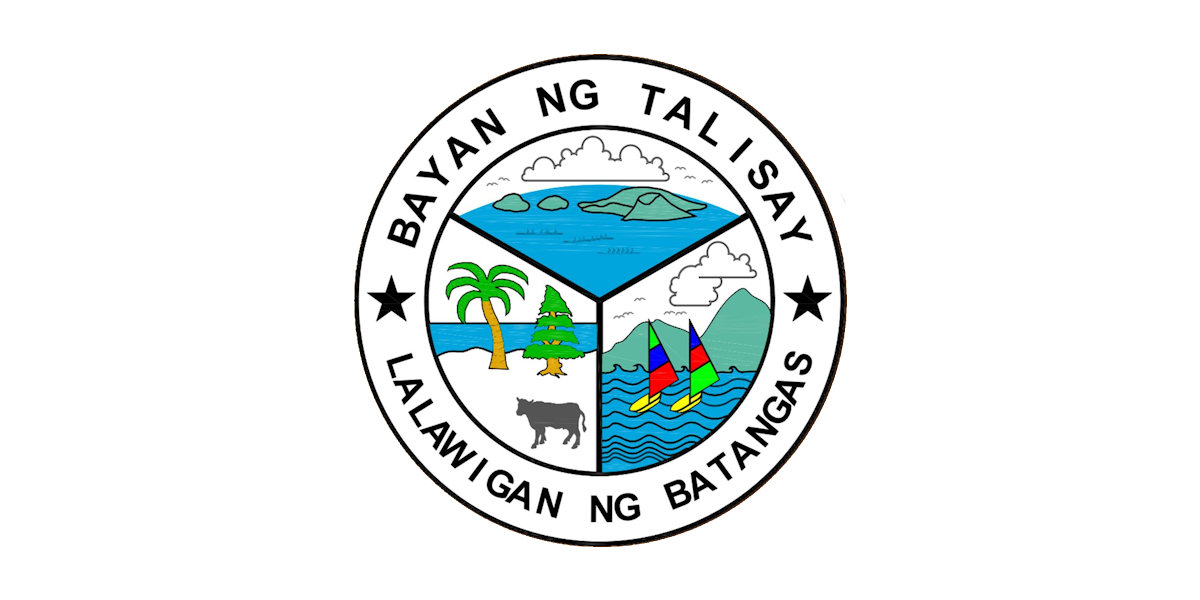
- Flag
- Nicknames: Seedling Bowl of the Nation; Gateway to Taal Volcano
- Motto: Laging Gawin Dapat ang Nararapat (Eng. trans. : "Always Do What is Right")
- Anthem: Talisay Hymn
- Map of Batangas with Talisay highlighted
- Interactive map of Talisay
- Location within the Philippines
- Coordinates: 14°06′N 121°01′E
- Country: Philippines
- Region: Calabarzon
- Province: Batangas
- District: 3rd district
- Founded: February 10, 1869
- Annexation to Tanauan: March 28, 1903
- Reestablishment: July 23, 1906
- Named for: Terminalia catappa (locally called Talisay)
- Barangays: 21 (see Barangays)

Government
  - Type: Sangguniang Bayan
  - Mayor: Nestor D. Natanauan
  - Vice Mayor: Francis M. Magsino
  - Representative: Kong George Leandro Antonio V. Collantes
  - Municipal Council: Members: Antonio V. Zagala; Henry C. De Leon; Edgardo A. Caraan; Melody L. Luna; Nestor A. Cabrera; Florencio M. Mainot; Felix P. Salazar; Ma. Teresa M. Panghulan
  - Electorate: 30,724 voters (2025)

Area
  - Total: 28.20 km^{2} (10.89 sq mi)
  - Rank: 29 of 34 in Batangas
- Elevation: 227 m (745 ft)
- Highest elevation: 743 m (2,438 ft)
- Lowest elevation: 5 m (16 ft)

Population (2024 census)
  - Total: 46,477
  - Rank: 22 of 34 in Batangas
  - Density: 1,648/km^{2} (4,269/sq mi)
  - Households: 10,785
- Demonym(s): Taliseño (masculine), Taliseña (feminine)

Economy
  - Income class: 1st municipal income class
  - Poverty incidence: 7.13% (2023)
  - Revenue: ₱ 242.4 million (2024)
  - Revenue rank: 22 of 34 in Batangas
  - Assets: ₱ 757 million (2024)
  - Assets rank: 20 of 34 in Batangas
  - Expenditure: ₱ 106.3 million (2024)
  - Liabilities: ₱ 134.4 million (2024)

Service provider
  - Electricity: Batangas 2 Electric Cooperative (BATELEC 2)
- Time zone: UTC+8 (PST)
- ZIP code: 4220
- PSGC: 0401030000
- IDD : area code: IDD : area code
- Native languages: Tagalog
- Feast date: February 10
- Patron saint: Saint William of Maleval
- Website: www.talisaybatangas.gov.ph

Talisay, officially the Municipality of Talisay (Tagalog: Bayan ng Talisay), is a municipality in the province of Batangas, Philippines. According to the 2024 census, it has a population of 46,477 people.

== Etymology ==
Talisay is derived from a tree of the same name (Terminalia catappa) where the bells of a Catholic parish church were hung. Such church was then a temporary building located at the center of the then barrio.

== History ==
Talisay traces its roots to a barrio that was once part of Tanauan during the Spanish colonization of the Philippines. In 1754, it was annexed to Taal following the transfer of Tanauan's seat to its present-day barangay Sala as a result of the Taal Volcano eruption that year.

Talisay was later formed as a separate municipio on February 10, 1869. However, on March 28, 1903, during the American occupation, it was returned to Tanauan but later separated on July 23, 1906 to regain its independent status.

On April 1, 1941, a portion of Talisay, especially its barrios Birinayan (Berinayan) and Caloocan, was ceded to Tagaytay through Executive Order No. 336 signed by President Manuel L. Quezon. Both aforementioned barrios were later returned to Talisay on June 7, 1956.

On June 21, 1969, the barrios of Bayuyungan, Ticub, Balakilong, Bugaan, Borinayan (Berinayan), As-is, San Gabriel, and Buso-buso were separated from Talisay to constitute the new municipality of Laurel by virtue of Republic Act No. 5689.

== Geography ==
Talisay is located at 14°06′N 121°01′E, in the north-central area of Batangas which is located southwest of the island of Luzon. Talisay is 56 kilometers (35 mi) from Batangas City, 79 kilometers (49 mi) from Metro Manila, and 15 kilometers (9.3 mi) from Tagaytay. It is bordered in the north by Tagaytay, west by Laurel, east by Tanauan, northeast by Calamba, and south by a vast volcanic lake called Taal Lake, where Taal Volcano is located, whose northern part is occupied by Talisay sharing with San Nicolas from its southern part.

According to the Philippine Statistics Authority, the municipality has a land area of 28.20 square kilometers (10.89 sq mi) constituting 0.90% of the 3,119.75-square-kilometer (1,204.54 sq mi) total area of Batangas.

=== Barangays ===
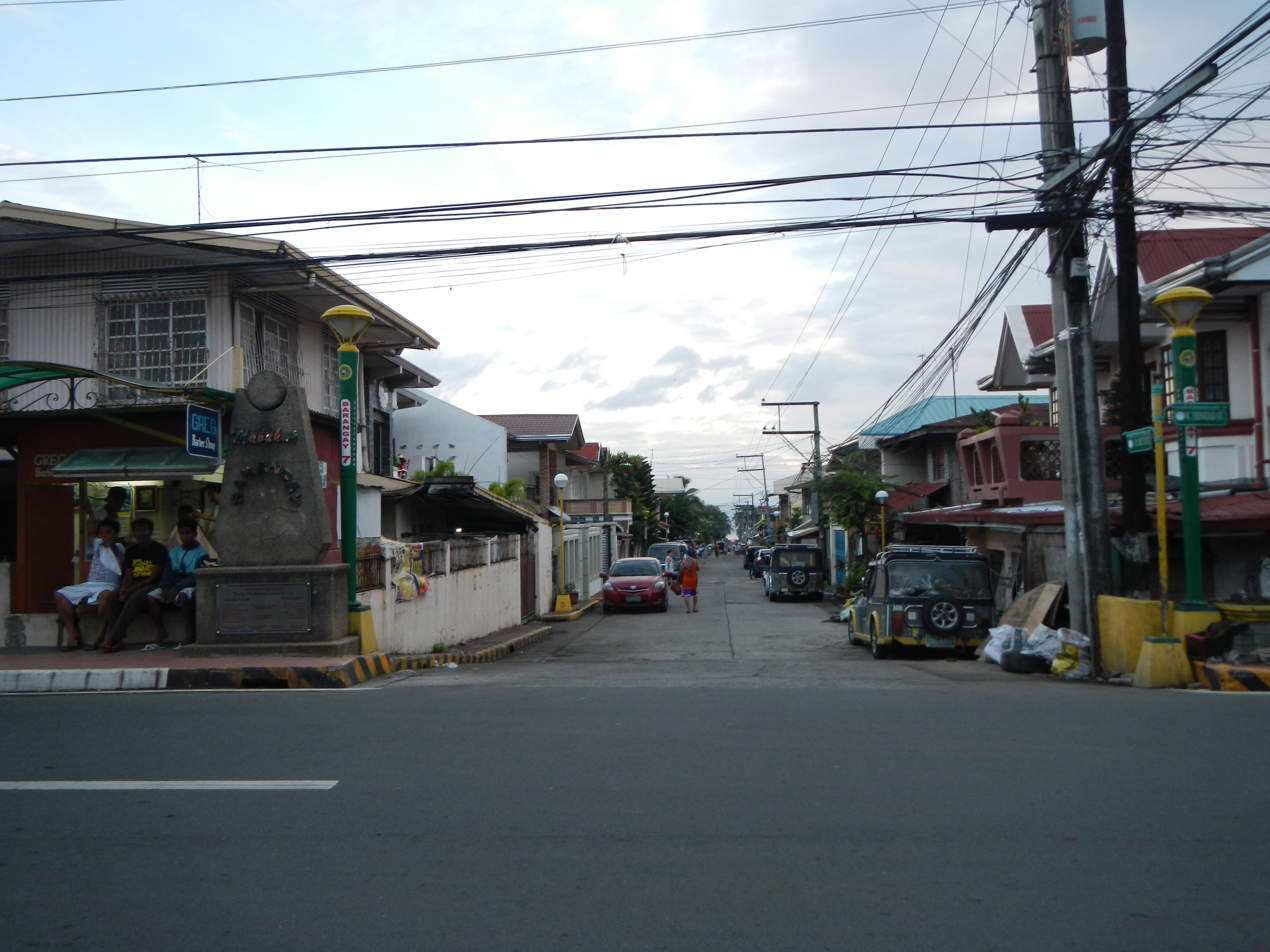
Street in Talisay

Talisay is politically subdivided into 21 barangays, as shown in the matrix below. Each barangay consists of puroks and some have sitios.

In 1953, the sitio of Buco in the barrio of Balas was converted into a barangay.

PSGC	Barangay	Population			±% p.a.	
		2024		2010		
0401030001	Aya	13.4%	6,215	5,523	▴	0.82%
0401030003	Balas	3.3%	1,530	1,187	▴	1.78%
0401030004	Banga	8.7%	4,050	3,917	▴	0.23%
0401030006	Buco	2.2%	1,005	975	▴	0.21%
0401030008	Caloocan	3.8%	1,785	1,665	▴	0.48%
0401030009	Leynes	3.2%	1,473	1,387	▴	0.42%
0401030010	Miranda (Kali-e)	4.1%	1,902	1,413	▴	2.08%
0401030011	Poblacion Barangay 1	4.1%	1,921	1,781	▴	0.53%
0401030012	Poblacion Barangay 2	3.0%	1,381	1,361	▴	0.10%
0401030013	Poblacion Barangay 3	1.6%	728	781	▾	−0.49%
0401030014	Poblacion Barangay 4	2.0%	928	799	▴	1.04%
0401030015	Poblacion Barangay 5	0.6%	265	221	▴	1.27%
0401030016	Poblacion Barangay 6	8.2%	3,796	2,428	▴	3.15%
0401030017	Poblacion Barangay 7	1.1%	504	483	▴	0.30%
0401030018	Poblacion Barangay 8	1.6%	736	770	▾	−0.31%
0401030019	Quiling	9.8%	4,544	3,855	▴	1.15%
0401030020	Sampaloc	9.7%	4,531	3,960	▴	0.94%
0401030021	San Guillermo (Sungay)	2.3%	1,066	991	▴	0.51%
0401030023	Santa Maria	3.0%	1,387	1,357	▴	0.15%
0401030024	Tranca	6.3%	2,950	2,660	▴	0.72%
0401030025	Tumaway	5.6%	2,604	2,086	▴	1.55%
	Total		46,477	39,600	▴	1.12%

=== Climate ===
Climate data for Talisay, Batangas
Month	Jan	Feb	Mar	Apr	May	Jun	Jul	Aug	Sep	Oct	Nov	Dec	Year
Mean daily maximum °C (°F)	29 (84)	30 (86)	31 (88)	33 (91)	32 (90)	30 (86)	29 (84)	29 (84)	29 (84)	29 (84)	29 (84)	29 (84)	30 (86)
Mean daily minimum °C (°F)	20 (68)	20 (68)	21 (70)	22 (72)	24 (75)	24 (75)	24 (75)	24 (75)	24 (75)	23 (73)	22 (72)	21 (70)	22 (72)
Average precipitation mm (inches)	11 (0.4)	13 (0.5)	14 (0.6)	32 (1.3)	101 (4.0)	142 (5.6)	208 (8.2)	187 (7.4)	175 (6.9)	131 (5.2)	68 (2.7)	39 (1.5)	1,121 (44.3)
Average rainy days	5.2	5.0	7.4	11.5	19.8	23.5	27.0	25.9	25.2	23.2	15.5	8.3	197.5
Source: Meteoblue (modeled/calculated data, not measured locally)

== Demographics ==
Population census of Talisay

Year	Pop.	±% p.a.
1903	5,657	—
1918	6,986	+1.42%
1939	11,939	+2.58%
1948	12,140	+0.19%
1960	19,834	+4.17%
1970	14,821	−2.87%

Year	Pop.	±% p.a.
1975	16,624	+2.33%
1980	19,447	+3.19%
1990	23,153	+1.76%
1995	26,997	+2.92%
2000	32,465	+4.03%
2007	39,120	+2.61%

Year	Pop.	±% p.a.
2010	39,600	+0.44%
2015	45,301	+2.59%
2020	46,238	+0.43%
2024	46,477	+0.12%

Source: Philippine Statistics Authority

In the 2024 census, Talisay had a population of 46,477 people. The population density was 1,600 inhabitants per square kilometer (4,100/sq mi).

== Economy ==
Poverty incidence of Talisay (%)

Source: Philippine Statistics Authority

Financial Position:

- Assets: ₱743,359,092.54
- Liability: ₱ 148,896,044.80
- Equity: ₱ 594,463,048.14

Results of Operation:

- Income: ₱ 231,592,120.39
- Expenses: ₱ 184,318,341.21
- Surplus (deficit): ₱ 47,273,779.18

== Government ==
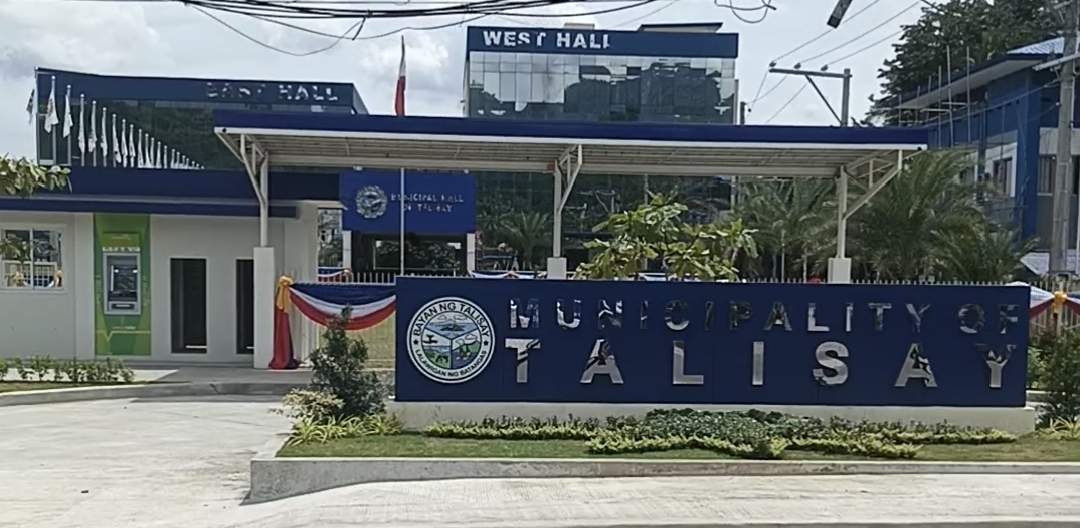
Talisay Municipal Hall

Talisay municipal officials (2025–2028)
Name	Party
Mayor
Nestor Natanauan	NPC
Vice Mayor
Francis Magsino	NPC
Councilors
Antonio Zagala	Independent
Edgardo Caraan	NPC
Henry De Leon	NPC
Melody Luna	NPC
Ma. Teresa Panghulan	NPC
Nestor Cabrera	NPC
Florencio Mainot	NPC
Felix Salazar	NPC
Ex Officio Municipal Council Members
ABC President	Edgardo Santarin (Sampaloc)
SK President	Alessandra Palomeno (Poblacion Barangay 8)

== Education ==
The Talisay Schools District Office governs all educational institutions within the municipality. It oversees the management and operations of all private and public, from primary to secondary schools.

Talisay hosts a range of primary, secondary, and tertiary educational institutions, both public and private. The city's primary schools include nine public and two private institutions, catering to students from Kindergarten to Grade 6. For secondary education, there are two public and three private institutions offering education from Grades 7 to 12. Additionally, Talisay is home to the Polytechnic University of the Philippines – Talisay Campus, a public university established in 2024.

=== Primary and elementary school ===
- Balas Elementary School
- Banga Elementary School
- Caloocan Elementary School
- Conqueror Christian Academy
- Doña Maria Laurel Platon Memorial School
- Dove Del Casa Learning School
- Jorge B. Vargas Memorial Elementary School
- Mcrew Educational Institute
- Miranda Elementary School
- Quiling Elementary School
- San Guillermo Elementary School
- St. Charles Borromeo School
- Tranca Elementary School
- Venancio Trinidad Sr. Memorial School

=== Secondary schools ===
- Adonai-King of Glory Christian School
- Balas Buco Sta. Maria National High School
- Dona Maria Laurel Platon School of Agriculture
- Golden Pond School
- San Guillermo Academy
- Santa Immaculada Concepcion Learning School
- Santo Augustino Academy
- Talisay High School
- Talisay Polytechnic Institute
- Talisay Senior High School
