= N4 =

N4, N-4, or N.4 may refer to:

== Computing ==
- N4 (NHS), the successor to the N3 NHS computer network
- NASCAR Racing 4, a NASCAR sim by Papyrus and Sierra
- N4, a Markup Language
- N4, TSMC's 4 nm semiconductor process node

== Energy ==
- N4 (nuclear reactor), a French pressurized water reactor type

== Roads ==
- N4 highway (Philippines)
- N4 (Bangladesh)
- N4 road (Belgium), a road connecting Brussels and Arlon
- N4 road (France)
- N4 road (Gabon)
- N4 road (Ireland), a National Primary Route connecting Dublin, Mullingar, Longford, Carrick-on-Shannon, and Sligo
- N4 road (Luxembourg)
- N4 road (Senegal)
- N4 road (South Africa), a road connecting the Botswana border, Pretoria, and the Mozambique border
- N4 road (Spain), a National Primary Route connecting Madrid and Andalusia
- N4 road (Switzerland)
- Nebraska Highway 4, a state highway in the U.S. state of Nebraska
- Route nationale 4 (Niger)

== Transport ==
- Fairey N.4, a British reconnaissance flying boat of the 1920s
- LNER Class N4, a British steam locomotive class
- Minerva Airlines, IATA airline designator
- SP&S Class N-4, a steam locomotive class
- USS N-4 (SS-56), a 1916 N-class coastal defense submarine of the United States Navy

== Other ==
- N_{4}, an unstable molecule of nitrogen (tetranitrogen)
- N4, a postcode district in the N postcode area of London
- N4, a Drum & Bass / Hardcore record label run by Pete Cannon. Named after the N4 London postcode district
- N4 (television channel), a community television channel in Akureyri, Iceland
- Washburn N4, an electric guitar
- The second level in the Japanese Language Proficiency Test
- Nexus 4, an Android smartphone
- N4 (film), Indian Tamil films of 2023

== See also ==
- 4N (disambiguation)

N04 may refer to:

- ATC code N04 Anti-parkinson drugs, a subgroup of the Anatomical Therapeutic Chemical Classification System
- Griswold Airport FAA LID
- Nephrotic syndrome ICD-10 code
- N°4, a shortening for Number Four (disambiguation)
