= Batangas–Lobo Road =

Secondary road in the Philippines

Batangas–Lobo Road
- Gov. Antonio A. Carpio Road; Batangas–Taysan–Lobo Road
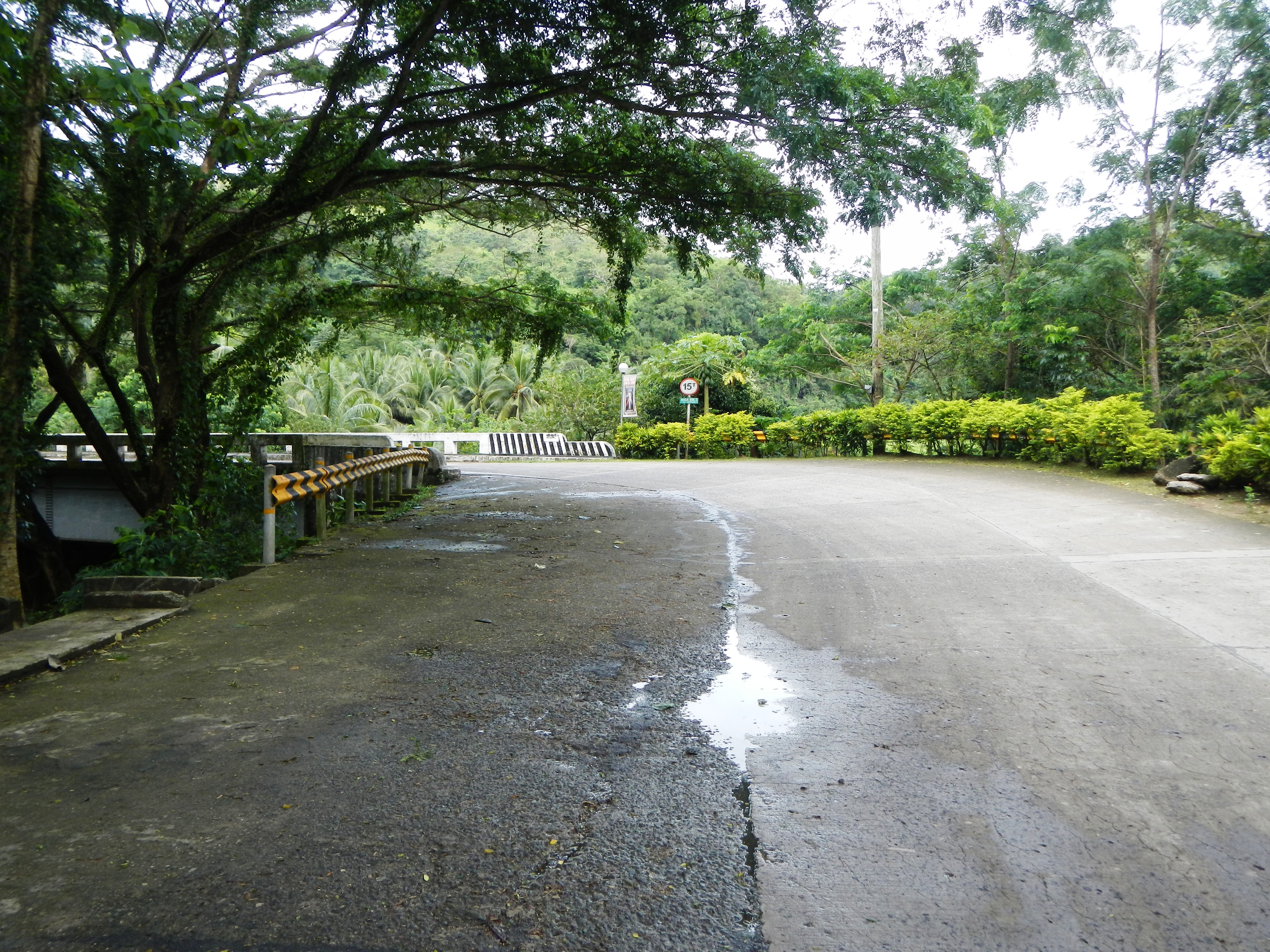
- The highway approaching Biga Bridge I in Lobo, Batangas

Route information
- Maintained by the Department of Public Works and Highways
- Length: 33.78 km (20.99 mi)

Major junctions
- From: N4 (Jose P. Laurel Highway) in Batangas City
- N439 (Batangas–Tabangao–Lobo Road) in Batangas City; N435-1 (STAR Tollway–Pinamucan Bypass Road) in Batangas City; Taysan–Pag-asa–Mapulo Road in Taysan
- To: N439 (Batangas–Tabangao–Lobo Road / Lobo–Malabrigo–San Juan Road) / Mabini Street in Lobo

Location
- Country: Philippines
- Provinces: Batangas
- Major cities: Batangas City
- Towns: Taysan; Lobo

Highway system
- Roads in the Philippines; Highways; Expressways; List
← N437	→ N439

National Route 438 (N438) or the Batangas–Lobo Road is a 33.78-kilometer (20.99 mi) secondary national road in the province of Batangas, Philippines that forms part of the Philippine highway network.

== Route description ==
The road starts at the junction with Pres. Jose P. Laurel Highway in Batangas City as a segment of Tolentino Road and turns east toward the outskirts of the city as Gov. Antonio A. Carpio Road^{[a]}. It then curves gently southward across the Calumpang River and passes by the high school campus of Lyceum of the Philippines University Batangas, where it meets with Ferry Road and the Batangas–Tabangao–Lobo Road at Brgy. Gulod Labac. The route heads southeast-ward at this junction, passes by the entrance to the Philippine Science High School Calabarzon campus and crosses with the STAR Tollway–Pinamucan Bypass Road in barangay Sampaga, then gradually slopes upon reaching the boundary of the city with the municipality of Taysan, where the road assumes the alternative name of Taysan–Lobo Road and turns slopier, curvier, and riddled with tight turns as it passes the proximity of Mounts Calo and Liguayen at the border with the municipality of Lobo. Finally, the route, locally known as P. Burgos Street, turns west towards the town proper before crossing nearby Lobo River and intersects with Batangas–Tabangao–Lobo Road (which continues P. Burgos Street) and Lobo–Malabrigo–San Juan Road (Mabini Street) just beside the town's public market.

== Intersections ==
The entire route is located in Batangas. Intersections are numbered by kilometer posts, with Rizal Park in Manila designated as kilometer zero.

City/Municipality	km	mi	Destinations	Notes
Batangas City			N4 (Jose P. Laurel Highway) – Manila, Lipa, Tanauan	Western terminus. Northbound goes to Manila, Tanauan, and Lipa; southbound goes to Batangas Port.
Batangas City			Antonio A. Carpio Road / Tolentino Road	Tolentino Road segment ends, N438 alignment with Gov. Carpio Road begins. Southbound to Tolentino Road leads to Batangas Provincial Capitol.
Batangas City			Gulod Labac–Dumantay–Paharang West Barangay Road / J.P. Quino Street	
Batangas City			N439 (Batangas–Tabangao–Lobo Road) – Lobo	Alternate route to Lobo town that runs along the coast overlooking Batangas Bay and Verde Island Passage.
Batangas City			Ferry Road	Access to Batangas City proper.
Batangas City			N435-1 (STAR Tollway–Pinamucan Bypass Road)	Meets with N435 (Batangas–Ibaan–San Juan Road) at Brgy. Tinga Itaas. Future connection with E2 (STAR Tollway). Southern segment towards Brgy. Pinamucan under construction.
Batangas City			Gulod Labac–Dumantay–Paharang West Barangay Road	
Batangas City			Talumpok East Road	Talumpok Silangan barangay road. Access to Mount Banoy.
Taysan			Taysan–Pag-asa–Mapulo Road — Taysan, Ibaan	Access to Taysan town proper.
Taysan			Taysan–Mahanadiong–Santo Niño Road — Taysan	Alternate access to Taysan town proper.
Lobo			Nagtaluntong Road	Access to Brgy. Nagtaluntong.
Lobo			N439 (Batangas–Tabangao–Lobo Road / Lobo–Malabrigo–San Juan Road) / Mabini Street – Batangas City, San Juan]	Eastern terminus.
1.000 mi = 1.609 km; 1.000 km = 0.621 mi

== Notes ==
a. Former Governor of Batangas province from January 1 to February 17, 1972, serving a total of only 47 days.
