= Jose P. Laurel Highway =

Major road in Batangas, Philippines

Jose P. Laurel Highway

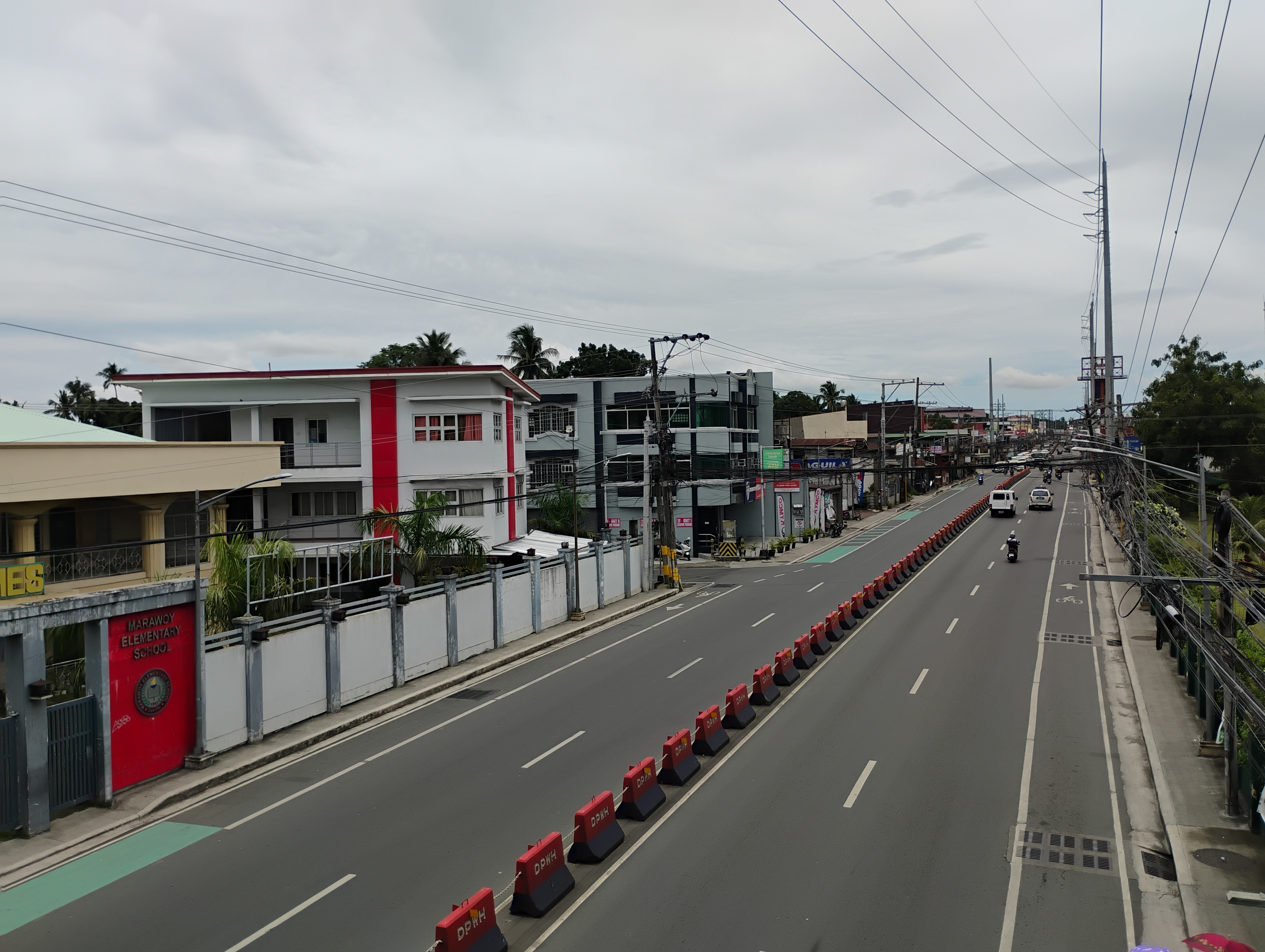
- The highway in Marauoy, Lipa, Batangas

Route information
- Maintained by the Department of Public Works and Highways
- Length: 49 km (30 mi)
- Existed: 1903–present
- Component highways: N4

Major junctions
- North end: AH 26 (N1) (Maharlika Highway) / N421-2 (Governor Carpio Avenue) in Santo Tomas
- N4 (General Malvar Street) in Santo Tomas; N421 (Mabini Avenue) in Tanauan; N431-1 (F. Leviste Highway) in Lipa; N421-1 (Alaminos–Lipa Road) in Lipa; N431 (General Luna Street) in Lipa; N431 (B. Morada Avenue) in Lipa; E2 (STAR Tollway) in Lipa; N433 (Banaybanay–Mojon–Cuenca Road) in Lipa: E2 (STAR Tollway) / N434 (Batangas Port Diversion Road) in Batangas City; N435 (Batangas–Ibaan Road) in Batangas City; N438 (Tolentino Road) in Batangas City
- South end: N436 (Palico–Balayan–Batangas Road) / N437 (P. Burgos Street) in Batangas City

Location
- Country: Philippines
- Provinces: Batangas
- Major cities: Santo Tomas, Tanauan, Lipa, Batangas City
- Towns: Malvar, San Jose

Highway system
- Roads in the Philippines; Highways; Expressways; List
← N3	→ N5

Jose P. Laurel Highway, formerly known as the Sto. Tomas–Batangas City–Nasugbu Road, is a 49-kilometer (30 mi), two-to-six lane, major highway running within the province of Batangas. The highway forms part of National Route 4 (N4) of the Philippine highway network. It is also known as Manila–Batangas Diversion Road in Santo Tomas, Manila–Batangas Road from its junction with General Malvar Street in Santo Tomas southwards, and Ayala Highway in Lipa.

The highway was named in honor of José Paciano Laurel, who served as the president of the Second Philippine Republic. Laurel was born in Tanauan, Batangas, through which the highway traverses.

== Route description ==
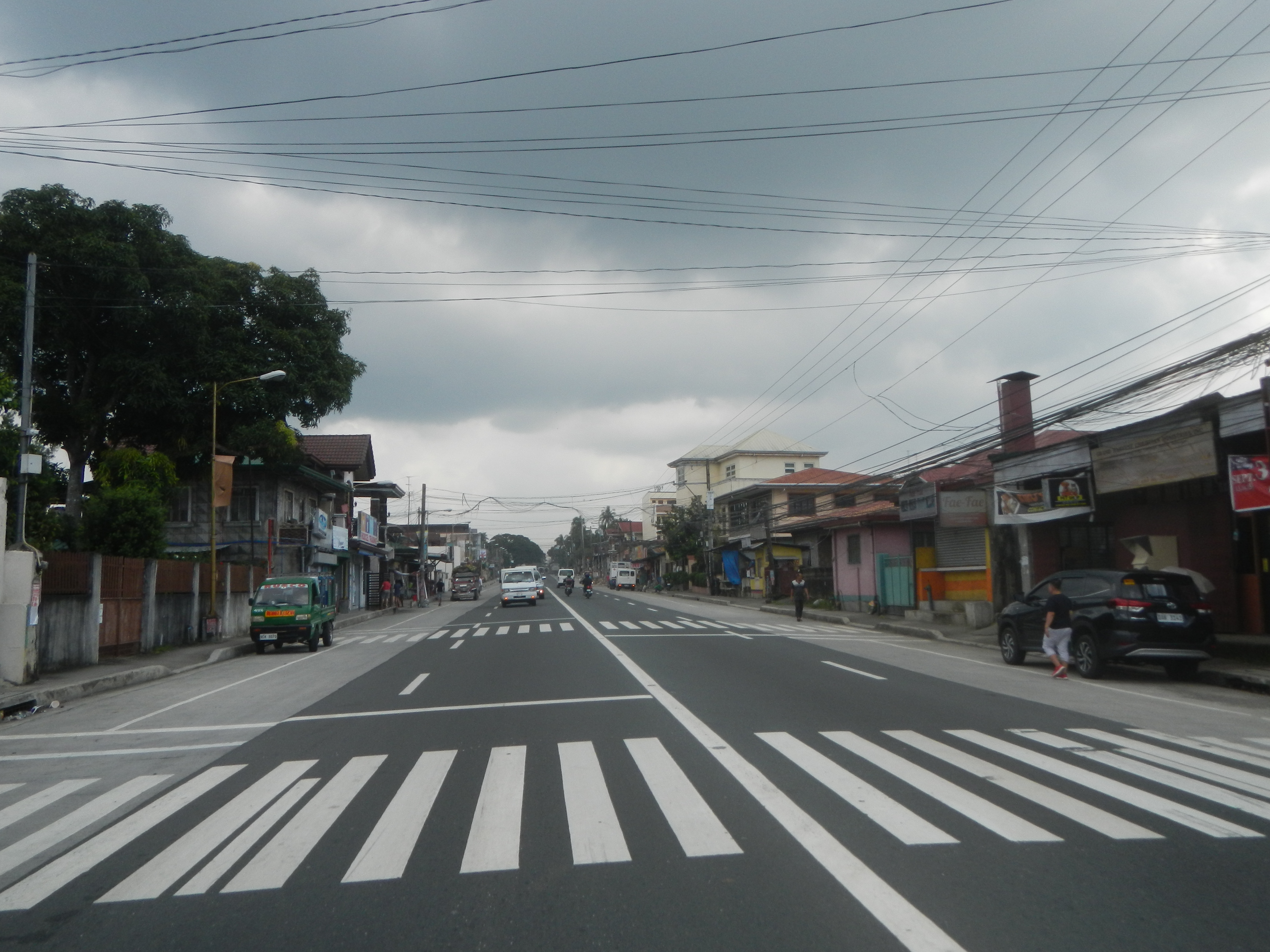
Jose P. Laurel Highway in Malvar

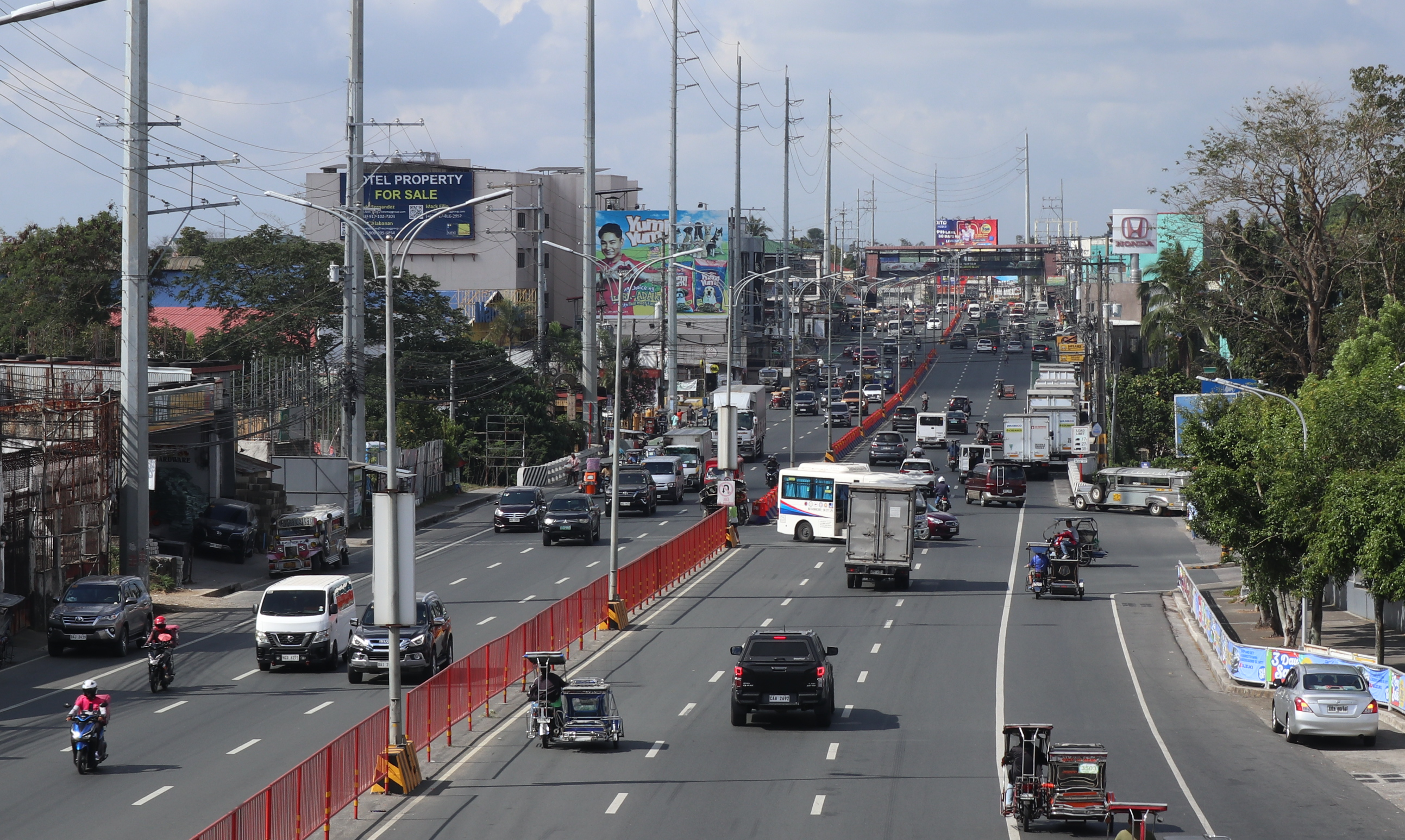
Jose P. Laurel Highway as Ayala Highway in Lipa

Jose P. Laurel Highway starts at the Santo Tomas Junction, a roundabout with the Maharlika Highway and Governor Carpio Avenue (officially part of Manila South Road via Santo Tomas Poblacion) in Santo Tomas, officially as the Manila–Batangas Diversion Road, which bypasses the Santo Tomas poblacion. It then merges with the old main route, officially known as the Manila–Batangas Road, and passes through the downtowns of Tanauan and Malvar. In Lipa, it bypasses the city proper as Ayala Highway before rejoining the old alignment. The highway continues south through San Jose, where it bypasses its town proper, and Batangas City, where it ends at Lawas Junction, its intersection with Palico–Balayan–Batangas Road (Calicanto Road) and P. Burgos Street (Manila–Batangas Pier Road) in the city proper.

The Southern Tagalog Arterial Road mostly parallels the highway and crosses each other in Lipa and Batangas City.

== History ==
Most of the highway traces its roots to the Manila–Batangas Road or Calamba–Batangas Road, which connects Calamba, Laguna, to the Batangas Bay coastline in the then-town of Batangas. Construction of the road began on October 1, 1900. By 1901, segments from Calamba to Tanauan and from the Batangas Bay to the Batangas poblacion have been completed. On March 20, 1903, the highway was completed when the segments between Tanauan and Batangas were opened. The road was designated as Highway 19 or Route 19 from Santo Tomas southwards, while the northern segment up to Calamba formed part of Highway 1 or Route 1, which would be eventually integrated to the Manila South Road and eventually the Pan-Philippine Highway (up to Calamba Interchange with South Luzon Expressway).

New alignments bypassing the downtowns of San Jose, Lipa (now known as Ayala Highway), and Santo Tomas (officially known as Manila–Batangas Diversion Road), respectively, were later built and made part of the present-day highway.

The road was known as the Sto. Tomas–Batangas City–Nasugbu Road until June 10, 1976, when it was renamed President Laurel Highway by virtue of Presidential Decree No. 743. While legally covering the entire corridor up to Nasugbu at the west, the name is currently applied to the eastern stretch between Santo Tomas and Batangas City. The western portion, officially designated as the Palico–Balayan–Batangas Road and Tagaytay–Nasugbu Road, respectively, were never formally renamed, although the latter is known locally as J.P. Laurel Street through the Nasugbu town proper.

== Intersections ==
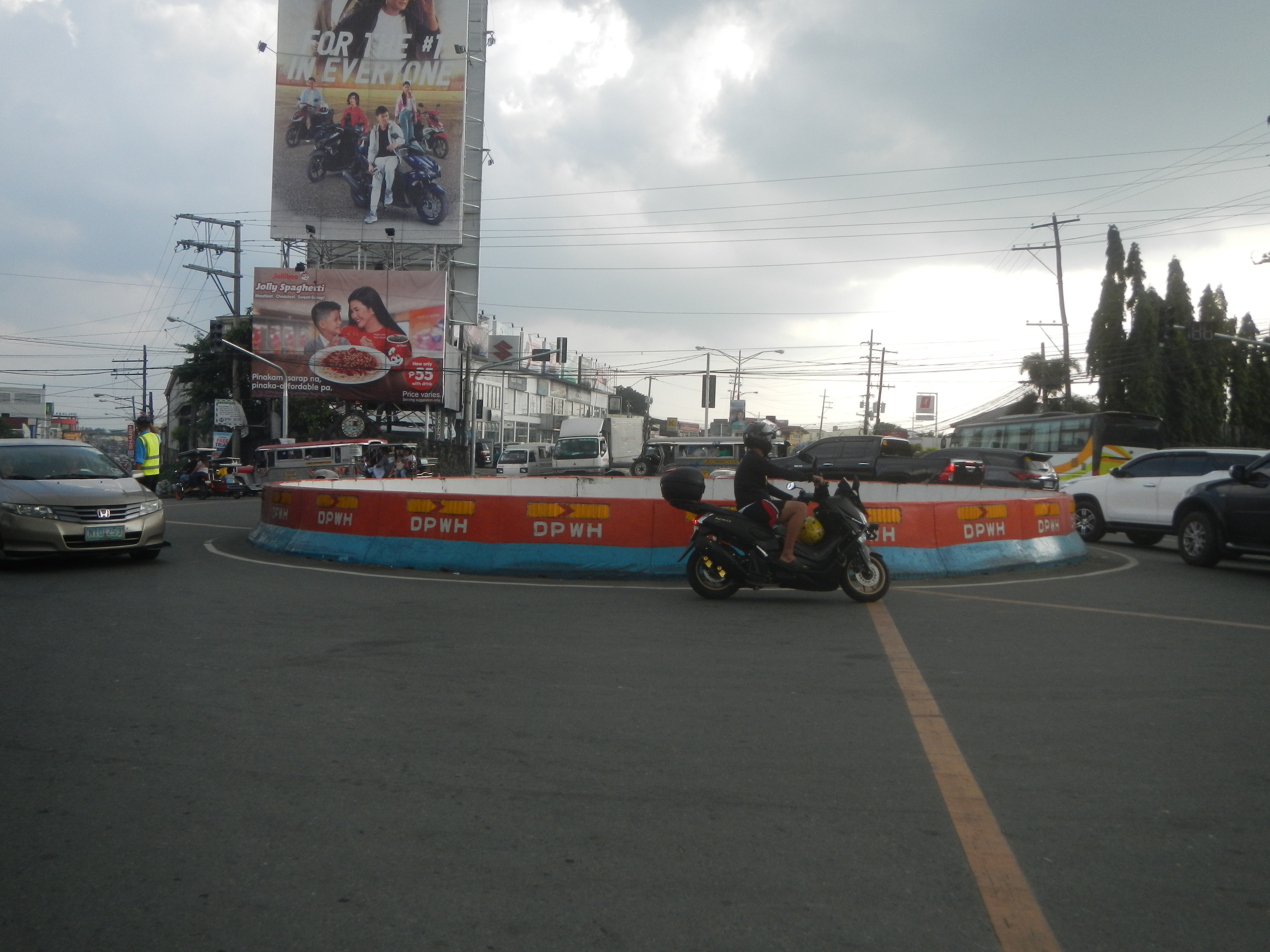
The former Sabang Rotonda in Lipa, the eastern end of the section known as Ayala Highway

The entire route is located in Batangas. Intersections are numbered by kilometer posts, with Rizal Park in Manila designated as kilometer zero.

City/Municipality	km	mi	Destinations	Notes
Santo Tomas			AH 26 (N1) (Maharlika Highway) / N421-2 (Governor Carpio Avenue) – Manila, San Pablo, Calamba	Northern terminus. Santo Tomas Roundabout.
Santo Tomas			N4 (General Malvar Avenue)	Roundabout interchange. Southern end of Manila–Batangas Diversion Road.
Santo Tomas			Santo Tomas Bypass Road	
Santo Tomas–Tanauan boundary			San Juan Bridge over San Juan River	
Tanauan			J. Gonzales Street	
Tanauan			N421 (Mabini Avenue) – STAR Tollway, Talisay, Tagaytay	Traffic light intersection.
Tanauan			Sixto Castillo Street	
Tanauan			P. Carandang Street	
Tanauan			Banjo Road	
Malvar			Isabelo G. Navarro Street	
Malvar			J. Lantin Street	
Malvar			Malvar–Santo Tomas Diversion Road	Access to AH 26 (N1) (Maharlika Highway).
Malvar			Pedro Montecer Street – STAR Tollway	
Malvar			San Juan Road	Access to Brgy. San Juan.
Malvar			San Andres Road	Access to Brgy. San Andres & San Juan.
Lipa			L.P. Leviste Road / Manila–Batangas Bypass Road – Alaminos	Northern end of bypass road.
Lipa			Alaminos–Lipa City Road / Manila–Batangas Bypass Road – Alaminos, Santo Tomas	Southern end of bypass road. Eastbound goes to the southern tip of Santo Tomas in Batangas and Alaminos in Laguna.
Lipa			N431-1 (F. Leviste Highway) – Balete	
Lipa			N421-1 (Alaminos–Lipa Road) – Alaminos	
Lipa			N431 (General Luna Street) – Padre Garcia, Rosario, San Juan	Eastern end of Ayala Highway.
Lipa			T.M. Kalaw Street	Access to Brgy. Sto. Toribio and Lipa City proper.
Lipa			San Carlos Drive – Balete	
Lipa			N431 (B. Morada Avenue) – Lipa city proper, Padre Garcia, Rosario, San Juan	Western end of Ayala Highway.
Lipa			Tambo–Lodlod Road	
Lipa			E2 (STAR Tollway) – Manila, Batangas City, Batangas Port	
Lipa			M.P. Casanova Street – Mataasnakahoy	Alternate access to Mataasnakahoy.
Lipa			N432 (Fernando Airbase Road)	Serves Basilio Fernando Air Base.
Lipa			Lipa–Mataaskahoy Road – Mataasnakahoy	Primary access to Mataasnakahoy.
Lipa			Narding Reyes Street	
Lipa			N433 (Banaybanay–Mojon–Cuenca Road) – Cuenca, Lemery, Calaca	Banaybanay Crossing.
Lipa			Banaybanay–Mojon–Tampoy Road	
San Jose			Charito Makalintal Avenue – San Jose town proper, Ibaan	
San Jose			Malaking Ilog Bridge	
San Jose			Pinagtung-ulan–Galamay-Amo–Taysan Road	
San Jose			Makalintal Avenue / Pulgeras Road – San Jose town proper, Alitagtag, Bauan	
San Jose			Chief Justice Q.C. Makalintal Avenue – San Jose town proper	
Batangas City			Bagong Pook–Tugtug Road – San Jose, Cuenca	
Batangas City			Balagtas Bridge over Balagtas River	
Batangas City			Batangas City–San Pascual–Bauan Bypass Road – Bauan, San Pascual, Mabini	
Batangas City			E2 (STAR Tollway) / N434 (Batangas Port Diversion Road) / Batangas–Balete Road – Batangas International Port, Manila	Balagtas Roundabout.
Batangas City			N435 (Batangas–Ibaan Road) – Ibaan, Tiaong, Padre Garcia, Rosario	
Batangas City			N438 (Tolentino Road) – Lobo, Taysan, San Juan	
Batangas City			Telecom Road	Batangas Provincial Capitol perimeter road.
Batangas City			Hilltop Road / Arce Road	Hilltop Road borders the Batangas Provincial Capitol.
Batangas City			N436 (Palico–Balayan–Batangas Road) / N437 (P. Burgos Street) – Batangas Port, Balayan, Lemery, Taal	Southern terminus. Traffic light intersection
1.000 mi = 1.609 km; 1.000 km = 0.621 mi

== Landmarks ==
Santo Tomas, Batangas

- Santo Tomas Junction
- Santo Tomas General Hospital

Tanauan, Batangas

- San Juan Bridge (San Juan River)
- First Asia Institute of Technology and Humanities

Malvar, Batangas

- Malvar Municipal Hall
- Malvar Church

Lipa, Batangas

- Lipa City Hall
- SM CIty Lipa
- Robinsons Lipa
- De La Salle Lipa
- Lipa Town Center
- Basilio Fernando Air Base

San Jose, Batangas

- Calansayan Bridge

Batangas City

- Balagtas Bridge
- SM Hypermarket Batangas
- Laurel Park
