= N7 road (Gabon) =

Road in Gabon

Location
- Country: Gabon

Highway system
- Transport in Gabon

The N7 road is one of the national highways of Gabon. It connects the far north-east of the country at Makokou to the south-east at Franceville.

Towns located along the highway include:

- Makokou
- Bakwaka
- Okondja
- Lékori
- Akiéni
- Ngouoni
- Franceville
