= 4N =

4N may refer to:

- 4th parallel north latitude
- Air North's IATA code
- 4N, the production code for the 1976 Doctor Who serial The Hand of Fear
- 4N, A special TSMC semiconductor node built specifically for Nvidia in their Geforce 40 Series of graphics cards

== See also ==
- Hückel's rule, 4n + 2 rule
- Singly even number, a number of the form 4n + 2
- A-4N, a model of Douglas A-4 Skyhawk
- AD-4N, a model of Douglas A-1 Skyraider
- RQ-4N, a model of Northrop Grumman RQ-4 Global Hawk
- F-4N Phantom II, see List of McDonnell Douglas F-4 Phantom II variants
- F7F-4N, a model of Grumman F7F Tigercat
- F4N, a model of Vought F4U Corsair
- N4 (disambiguation)
