= Batangas–Quezon Road =

Major road in Luzon, Philippines

Batangas–Quezon Road

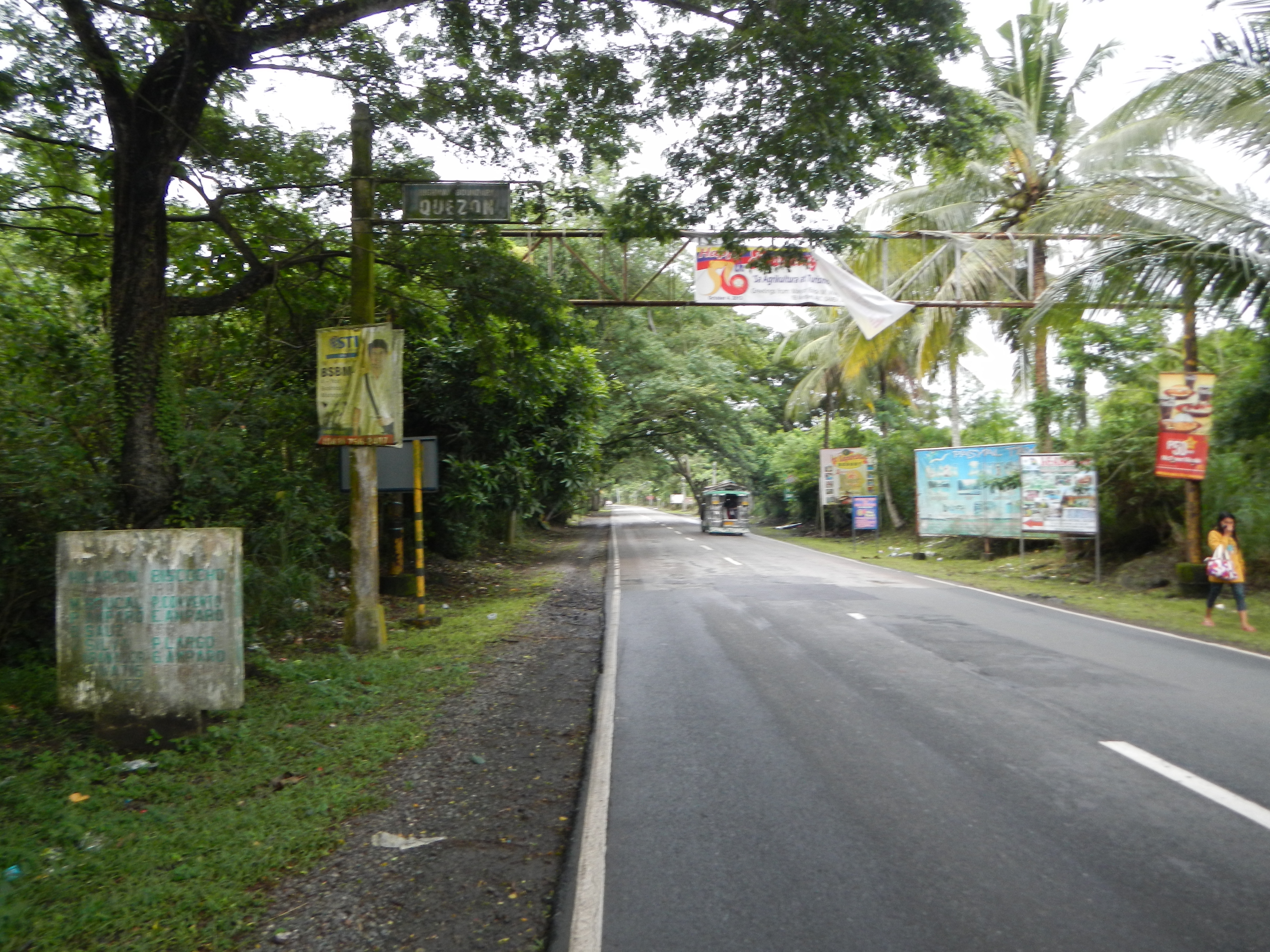
- Old welcome arch of San Antonio, Quezon along the highway.

Route information
- Maintained by the Department of Public Works and Highways
- Length: 39.81 km (24.74 mi)
- Component highways: N435 (Batangas–Ibaan–San Juan Road) N435 (Lipa–Rosario Road)

Major junctions
- West end: N4 (Jose P. Laurel Highway) in Batangas City
- STAR Tollway–Pinamucan Bypass Road in Batangas City; N422 (Rosario–San Juan Road) in Rosario; N431 (Lipa–Rosario Road) in Padre Garcia
- East end: AH26 (Maharlika Highway) / Recto Street in Tiaong

Location
- Country: Philippines
- Provinces: Batangas; Quezon
- Major cities: Batangas City
- Towns: Ibaan; Rosario; Padre Garcia; San Antonio; Tiaong

Highway system
- Roads in the Philippines; Highways; Expressways; List
← N434	→ N436

National Route 435 (N435), also known the Batangas–Quezon Road or Quezon–Batangas Road, is a 39.81-kilometer (24.74 mi), two-to-four lane, secondary national road in the provinces of Batangas and Quezon in the Philippines that forms part of the Philippine highway network.

== Route description ==
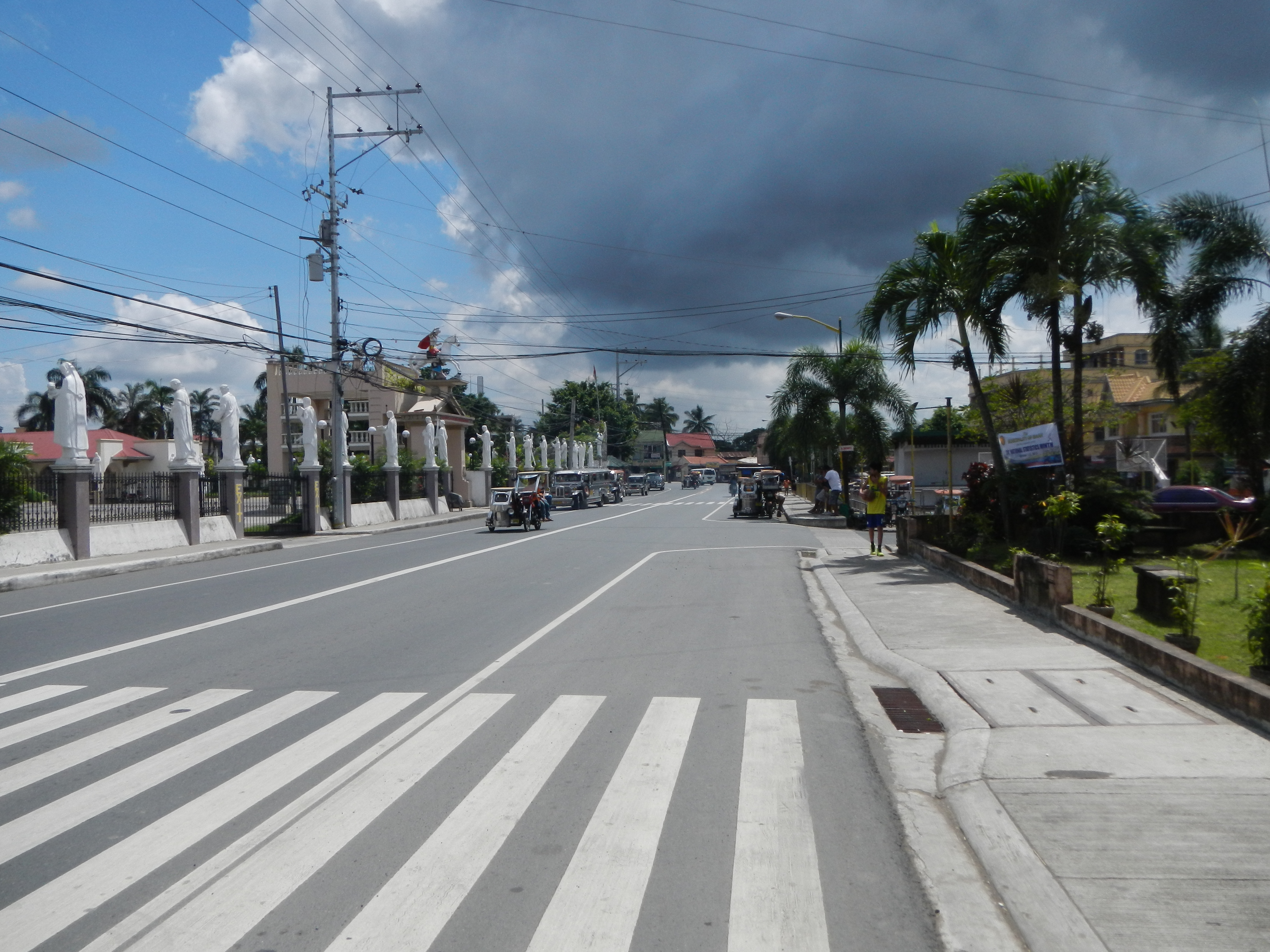
The highway as J.P. Rizal Street passing by Ibaan Church in the Ibaan town proper

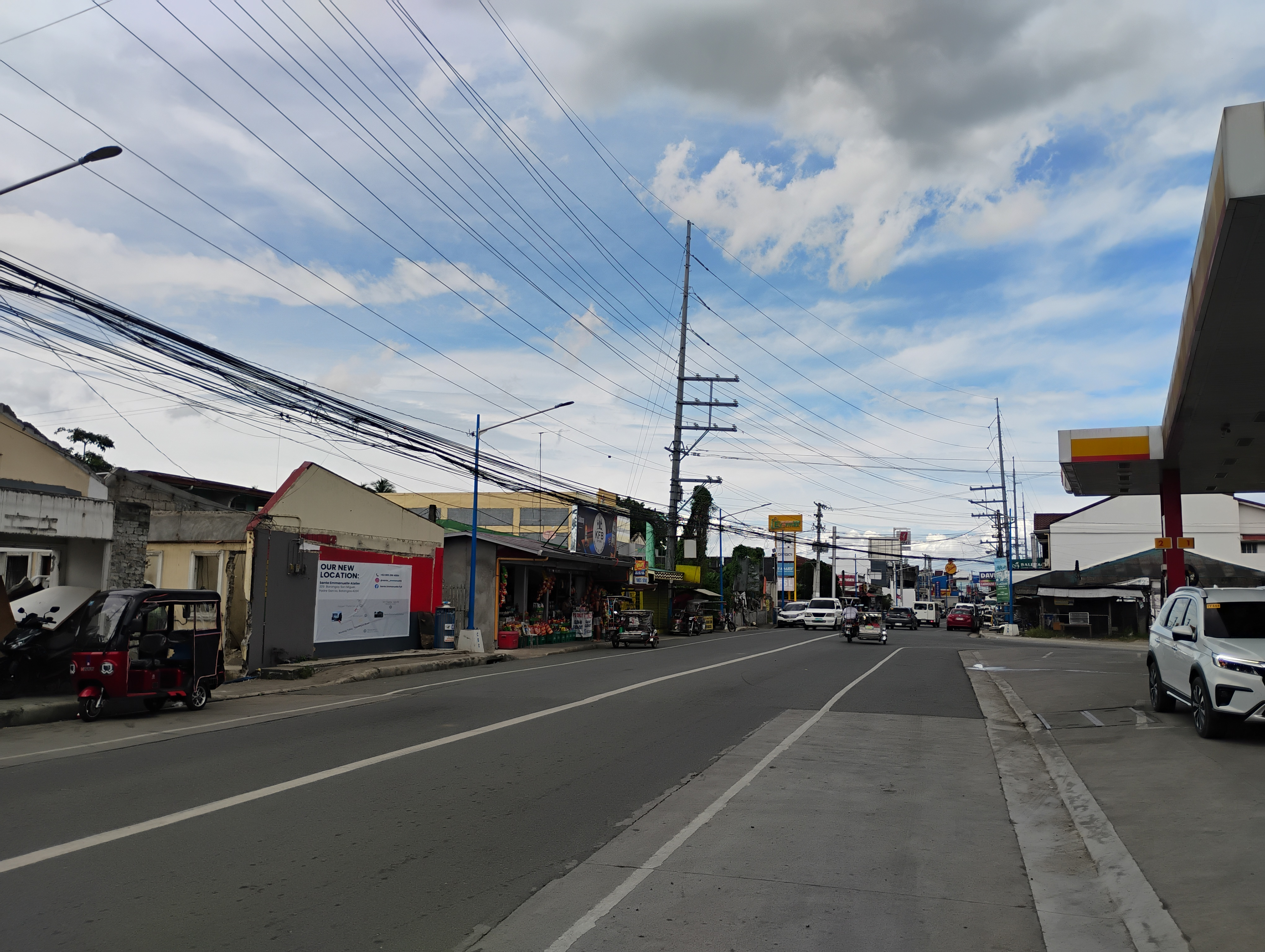
The highway in the town proper of Padre Garcia, Batangas

=== Batangas City to Padre Garcia ===
The route starts at the junction with President Jose P. Laurel Highway in Batangas City, just south of the STAR Tollway terminus. The road crosses Tinga River and meets with Pinamucan Bypass Road where a future exit of the STAR Tollway is being constructed. It continues to Ibaan, passing two triangle junctions in the town proper as J.P. Rizal Street and J. Pastor Street, respectively, and turns east onto the segment alternatively known as Pangao Road or Rosario–Ibaan Road towards Rosario. At the Rosario Junction in the town proper, the route continues north from the junction briefly as Carandang Street to the town of Padre Garcia

=== Padre Garcia to Tiaong ===
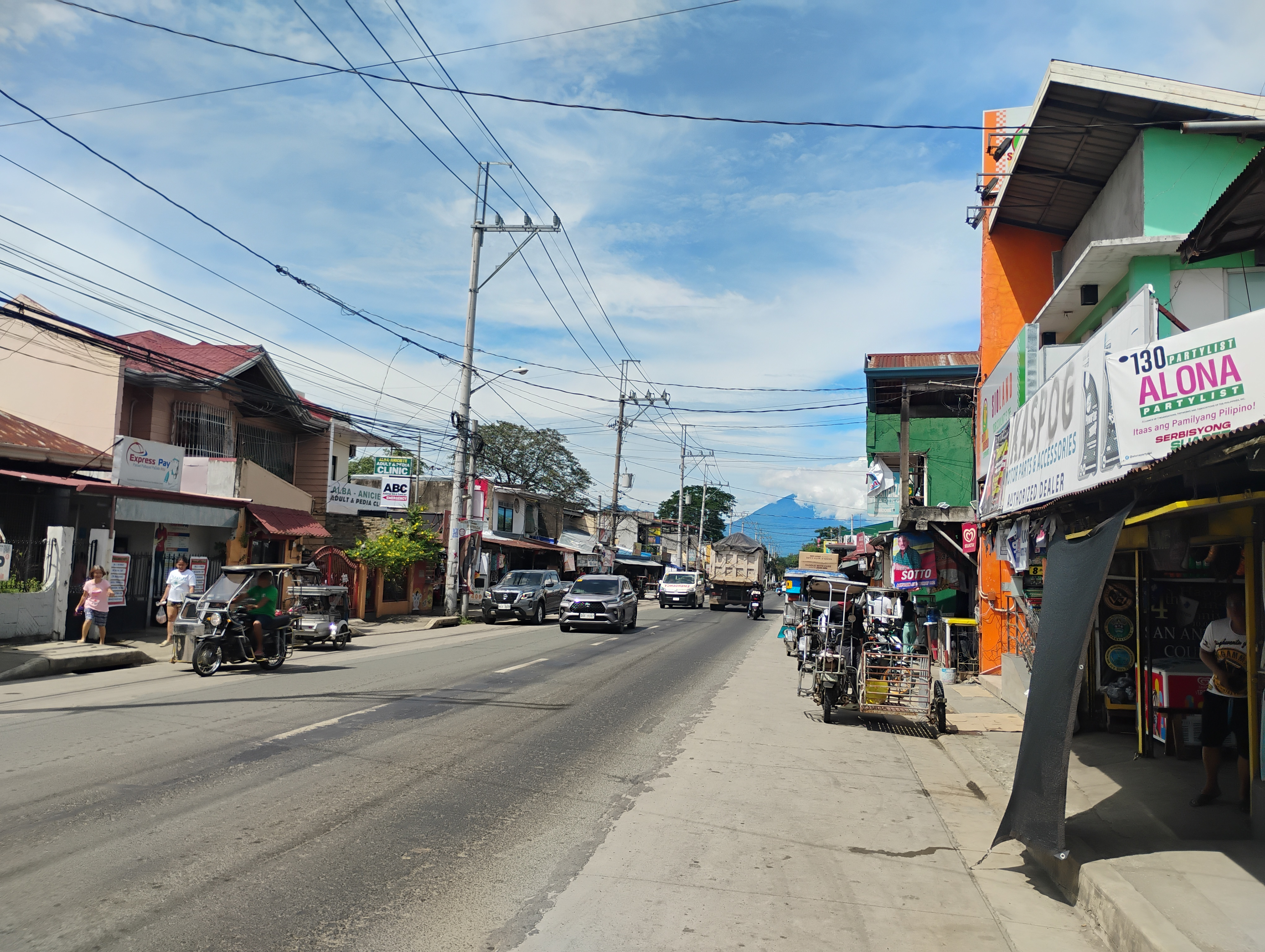
The highway in San Antonio, Quezon

In Padre Garcia town proper, the road forms a triangle and intersects with Lipa–Rosario Road. From there, it turns east and assumes the alternative name of Tiaong–Lipa Road. It then enters the province of Quezon at the town of San Antonio, proceeding to Tiaong. In the Tiaong town proper, it becomes locally known as Recto Street and ends at the Pan-Philippine Highway (Don V. Robles Avenue). Beyond this point, it continues as an unnumbered road also called Recto Street.

== History ==
The road, specifically its segment from Rosario to Padre Garcia, originated from an old thoroughfare that linked Lipa with Bolbok (now San Juan). Such segment formed part of Rosario Junction–Lipa Road. On the other hand, the segment between Tiaong and Padre Garcia was built during the Spanish occupation of the Philippines, requiring land recipients to contribute one-peso tax or one-week free labor, which rapidly boosted the population in the area as settlers built houses along the route.

The entire road system connecting Batangas and Quezon was historically known as the Batangas–Tayabas Interprovincial Road, which predates the renaming of the province of Tayabas to Quezon. It was also designated as Highway 19 during the American occupation of the Philippines. Roads from the present-day city of Batangas to Rosario and from Padre Garcia to Tiaong were later built and integrated with the present-day alignment.

== Intersections ==
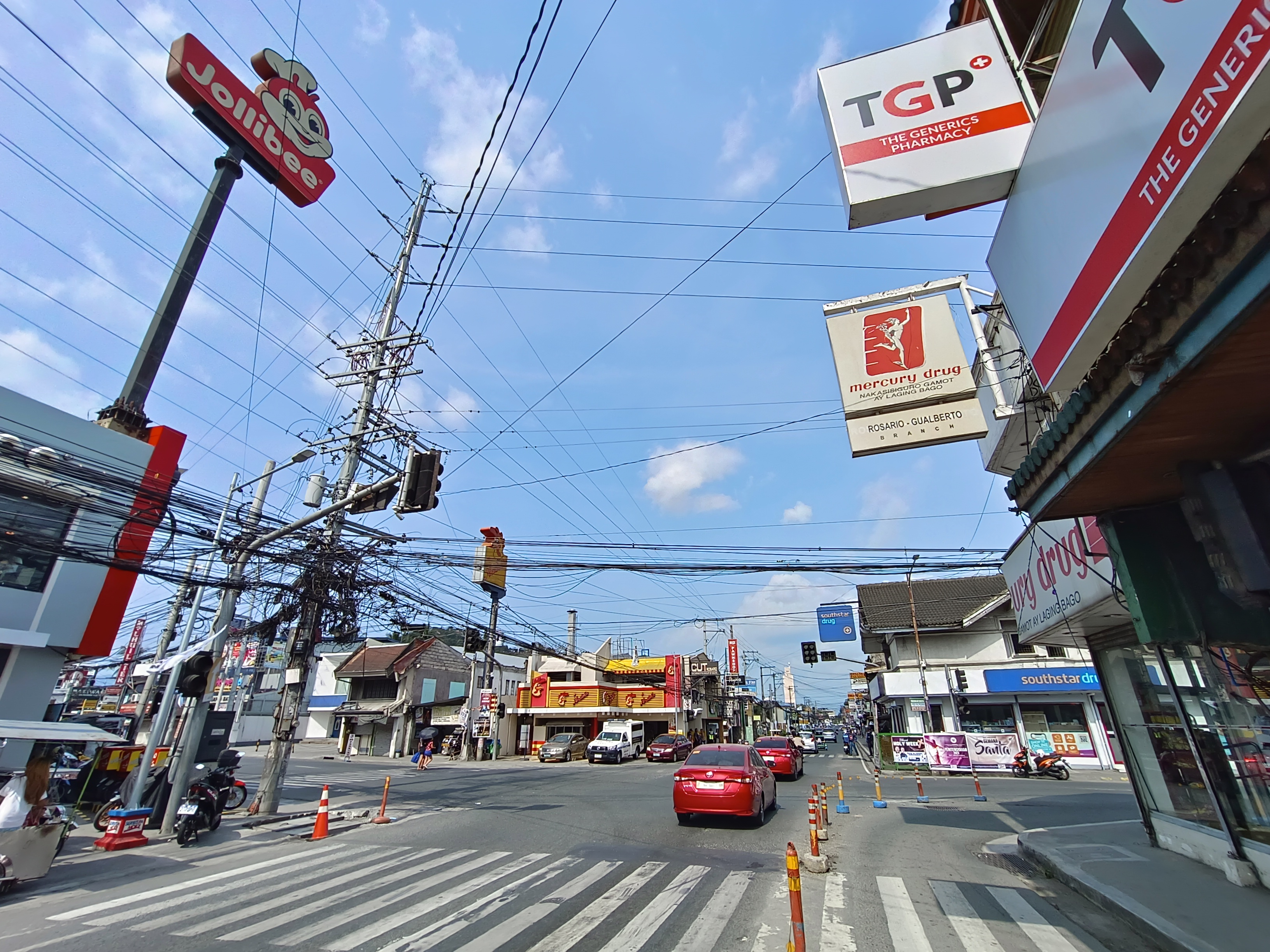
Rosario Junction in Rosario, Batangas

Intersections are numbered by kilometer posts, with Rizal Park in Manila designated as kilometer zero.

Province	City/Municipality	km	mi	Destinations	Notes
Batangas	Batangas City			N4 (Jose P. Laurel Highway) – Lipa, Santo Tomas, Tanauan, Manila	Route terminus.
Batangas	Batangas City			STAR Tollway–Pinamucan Bypass Road	Future connection with E2 (STAR Tollway). Southern segment towards Brgy. Pinamucan under construction.
Batangas	Ibaan			R.I. Reyes Street	
Batangas	Ibaan			J.P. Rizal Street / San Jose–Ibaan Road – San Jose	Poblacion West Triangle. Road turns east to Ibaan town proper via J.P. Rizal Street.
Batangas	Ibaan			J. Pastor Street / Lipa–Ibaan Provincial Road	Road turns north via Lipa–Ibaan Provincial Road.
Batangas	Ibaan			Lipa–Ibaan Provincial Road – Lipa	Poblacion East Triangle. Northbound to Lipa City. Road turns east towards Ibaan–Rosario Road.
Batangas	Rosario			Masaya–Timbugan Road	
Batangas	Rosario			N422 (Rosario–San Juan Road) / Rosario–Taysan Road – San Juan, Taysan, Lobo, Candelaria	Rosario Junction. Eastbound to San Juan and Candelaria; southbound to Taysan and Lobo. Route continues northward from this junction as Lipa–Rosario Road.
Batangas	Rosario–Padre Garcia boundary			Ibaan–Rosario–Padre Garcia Bypass Road	Southern end of bypass road. Under construction.
Batangas	Padre Garcia			Padre Garcia Diversion Road	Short diversion road towards Rosario Bypass Road.
Batangas	Padre Garcia			N431 (Lipa–Rosario Road) / San Miguel Barangay Road – Lipa, Alaminos	Padre Garcia Junction. Northbound to Lipa City and Alaminos.
Batangas	Padre Garcia			A. Mabini Street / Rosario Bypass Road – Rosario, San Juan	Southbound to Rosario and San Juan; bypasses Rosario town proper.
Batangas	Padre Garcia			Banaba–Bukal Road	
Batangas	Padre Garcia			Lipa–Padre Garcia Bypass Road – Lipa, Alaminos	Northbound to Lipa City and Alaminos.
Batangas	Padre Garcia			Ibaan–Rosario–Padre Garcia Bypass Road / Lipa–Padre Garcia Diversion Road	Northern end of Ibaan–Rosario–Padre Garcia Bypass Road. Southern end of diversion road. Both roads under construction.
Quezon	San Antonio			Alupay–San Antonio Road – Padre Garcia, Rosario, San Juan	
Quezon	San Antonio			Lipa–San Antonio Road – Lipa	Terminates at Brgy. San Celestino in Lipa City.
Quezon	Tiaong			AH26 (Pan-Philippine Highway) / Recto Street – San Pablo, Manila, Tayabas, Lucena	Route terminus.
1.000 mi = 1.609 km; 1.000 km = 0.621 mi: Unopened
