= N4 road (Gabon) =

Road in Gabon

Location
- Country: Gabon

Highway system
- Transport in Gabon

The N4 road is one of the national highways of Gabon. The road is 470 kilometer long. It is located to the north-east of the country.

Towns located along the highway include:

- Viate
- Ekonlong
- Makokou
- Mékambo

== History ==
In 2014, a 97 kilometer long stretch of the road leading to Franceville was tarmacked and upgraded. The works cost 68 billion Central African CFA franc, which were financed by the African Development Bank.
