= N4 (TV channel) =

Icelandic television channel

- Country: Iceland

Ownership
- Owner: N4 ehf.

History
- Launched: May 1, 2006
- Closed: February 3, 2023
- Former names: Aksjón

Links
- Website: Official Site

N4 was an Icelandic media company and a television channel. With its headquarters located in Akureyri, it was the only Icelandic television channel located outside the capital region. It was founded in 2006 with the merger of Samver, Extra dagskráin, Smit auglýsingagerð and Traustmynd.

Samver had previously run the television station Aksjón. Aside from operating the TV station, N4 has a website, profiles on several social media outlets (Facebook, YouTube, Instagram, Twitter, TikTok), a podcast and a bi-weekly newspaper as well as offering help with publishing and creating production projects.

The company filed for bankruptcy in January 2023 and closed down on February 3 the same year. A post on the channel's website and social media accounts said that attempts at surviving were fruitless.
