= Batangas International Port =

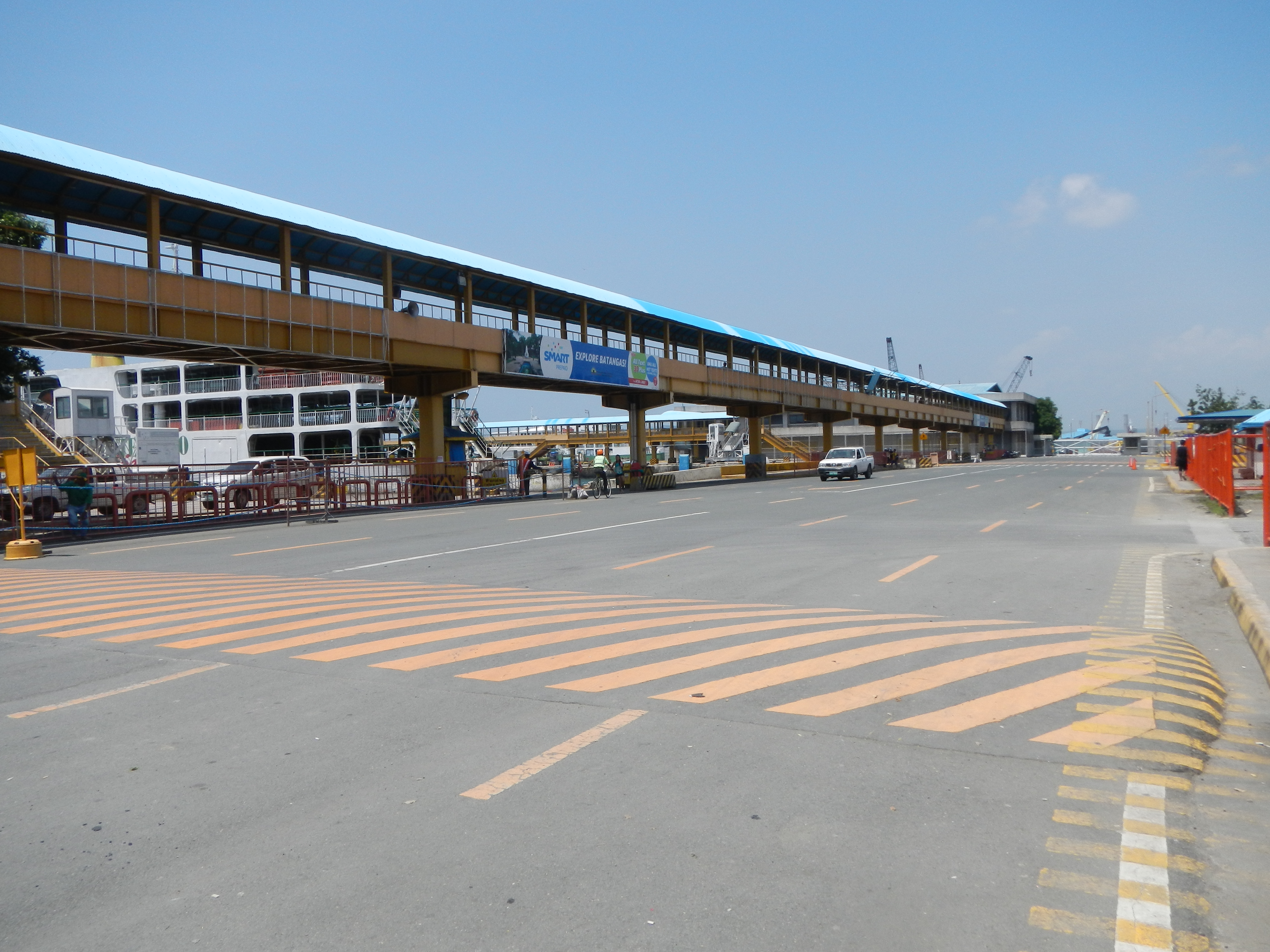
- Interactive map of Batangas International Port

Location
- Country: Philippines
- Location: Batangas City
- Coordinates: 13°45′16″N 121°02′36″E
- UN/LOCODE: PHBTG

Details
- Operated by: Philippine Ports Authority
- Type of Harbor: Passenger and cargo
- Land area: 150 hectares (1,500,000 m^{2})

Statistics
- Vessel arrivals: 32,777 (2015)
- Annual cargo tonnage: 2,374,980 (2015)
- Passenger traffic: 6,346,303 (2015)

The Batangas International Port (Filipino: Daungan Pandaigdig ng Batangas) or locally known as the Batangas Pier (Tagalog: Pantalan ng Batangas) is a seaport in Barangay Santa Clara, Batangas City primarily serving the Calabarzon region of the Philippines. The seaport covers an area of about 150 hectares.

It was declared as a national port in 1956. It serves as an alternate port to the Port of Manila. In the 1990s, it was the second biggest port in the Philippines in terms of revenue, just behind the Port of Manila.

== Terminals ==
=== Cargo terminal ===
The Batangas Container Terminal (BCT) of the Batangas International Port is operated by listed Asian Terminals Inc. is a major trading port outside Metro Manila serving major industries in Southern Luzon. BCT handled over 85,000 twenty-foot equivalent units (TEUs) of international containers from January to July 2016. In 2015, the terminal handled 130,000 TEUs in 2015, 28.9% of its actual capacity of 450,000 TEUs.

The Port of Batangas in 2014 was only handling 12,000 TEUs or 2.7% of its actual capacity. Philippine Ports Authority (PPA) discounts in the port and docking fees at the Batangas Port attracted more foreign and local shipping firms and incentivized them for helping decongest Manila's facilities. In 2016 it was reported that the Japan International Cooperation Agency (JICA) has proposed to transfer operations of the Port of Manila to the Batangas International Port, citing the fact that most of the domestic shipping largely comes from South of Manila, saying that ship operating costs would be relatively lower if vessels were docked in Batangas City rather than in Manila.

Other competing ports such as the Port of Subic Bay are also providing container storage services to ease congestion at the Manila ports. In August 2014, PPA reported an 85%–89% yard utilization for the MICT and Manila South Harbor.

=== Passenger terminal ===
On April 26, 2024, President Bongbong Marcos inaugurated the new 1.5-hectare (3.7-acre) Batangas Pier passenger terminal. As the “biggest, busiest and most modern passenger building", it can now accommodate 8,000 passengers, from its previous capacity of 2,500 daily, thereby increasing annual passenger capacity from 4 to 12.8 million. Philippine Ports Authority General Manager Jay Daniel Santiago said that the terminal connects mainland Luzon to Mimaropa, Iloilo, Negros, Cebu, and Mindanao via high-speed craft, ferries, and Roll-on/roll-off ships.

Batangas Port is served by several domestic shipping companies operating regular passenger and cargo services to destinations across the Philippines. These services include conventional ferries, fast craft, and RoRo vessels connecting Batangas to nearby islands and major regional ports.

==== Passenger routes ====
The port provides regular passenger services to several destinations across the Philippines, including but not limited to the following routes:

Destination	Province/Region	Type of Service	Approximate Travel Time	Notes
Puerto Galera	Oriental Mindoro	Passenger ferry / outrigger boats	Approximately 30 min–2 hours	Services operate mainly to Balatero Port, but some services have previously operated to Sabang, White Beach, and Muelle.
Calapan City	Oriental Mindoro	Fast craft and RoRo ferry	Approximately 1–3 hours	The busiest and most heavily served route from Batangas Port
Abra de Ilog	Occidental Mindoro	Fast craft and RoRo ferry	Approximately 2–3 hours	Regular services that connect Batangas with western Mindoro.
Caticlan	Aklan	Overnight RoRo ferry	Approximately 9–11 hours	Provides access to Boracay and Panay Island.
Odiongan	Romblon	Overnight RoRo ferry	Approximately 8-10 hours	Serves as a primary gateway to Tablas Island
Romblon / Sibuyan Island	Romblon	Overnight RoRo ferry	Approximately 10–16 hours	Routes connect Batangas to Romblon Port, with onward access to Sibuyan Island.
Roxas City	Capiz	Overnight RoRo ferry	Approximately 17–18 hours	Connected through inter-island ferry services operating via Romblon and Sibuyan Island.

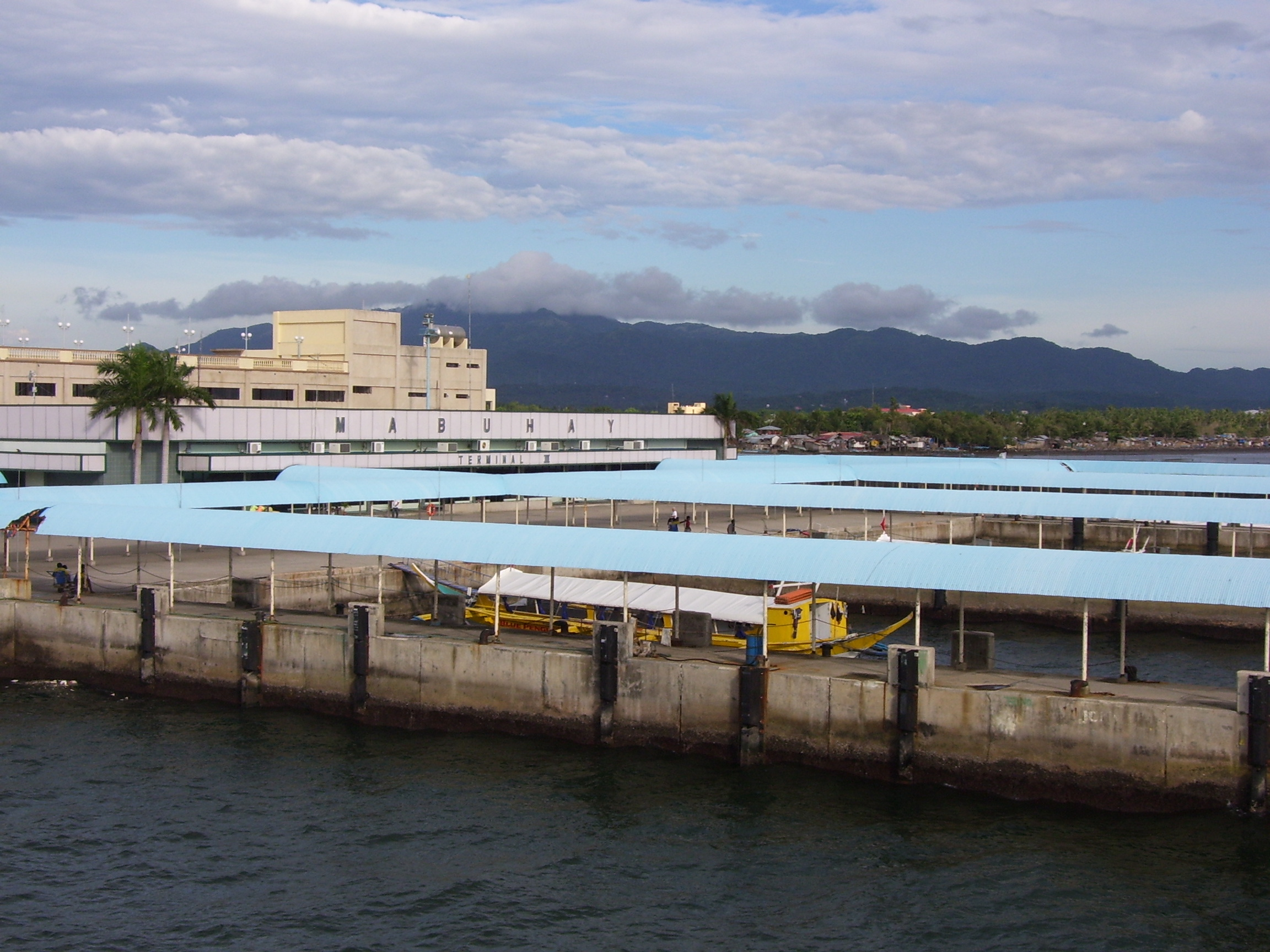
The seaport in 2008

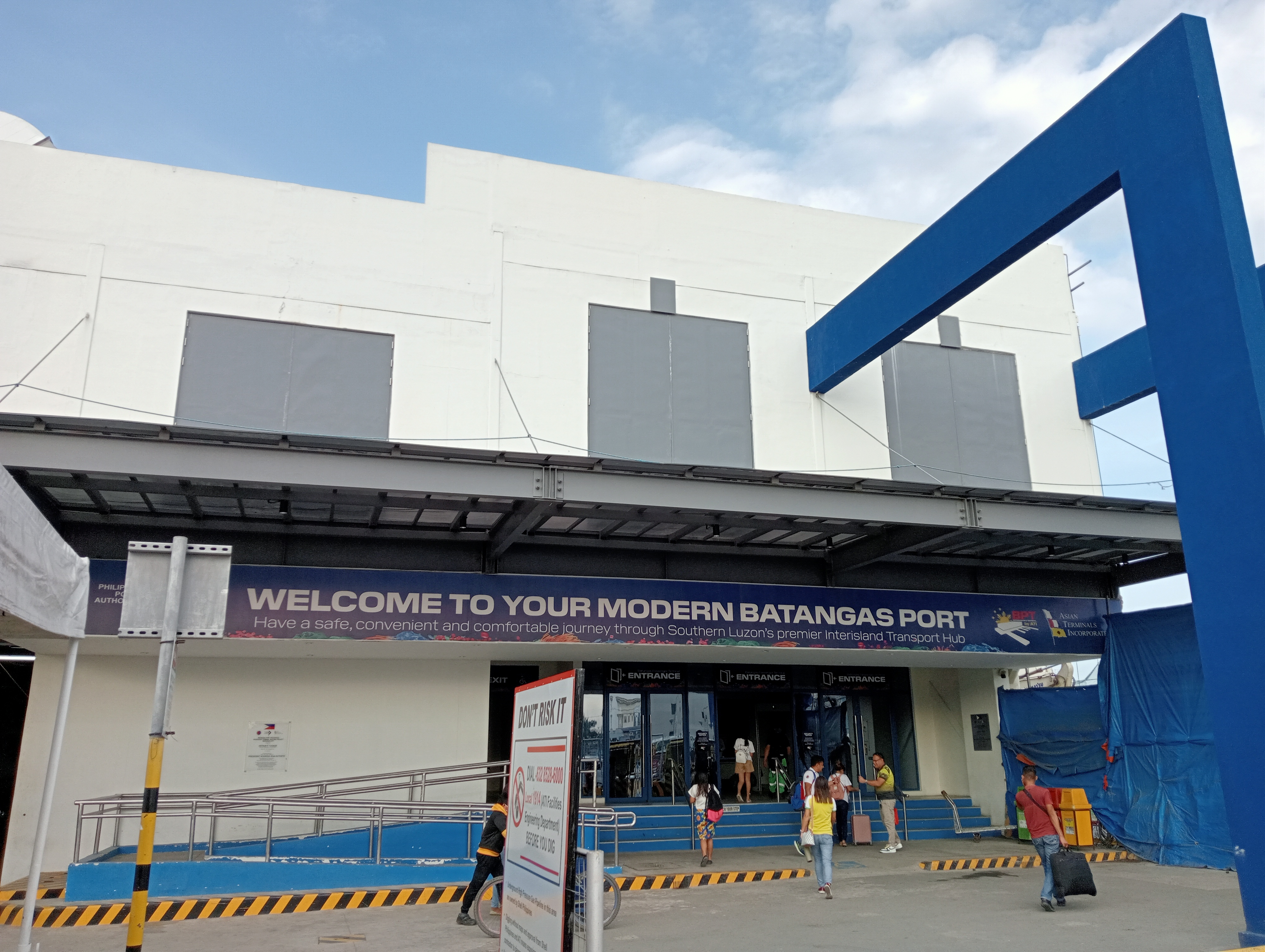
The integrated passenger terminal in 2023

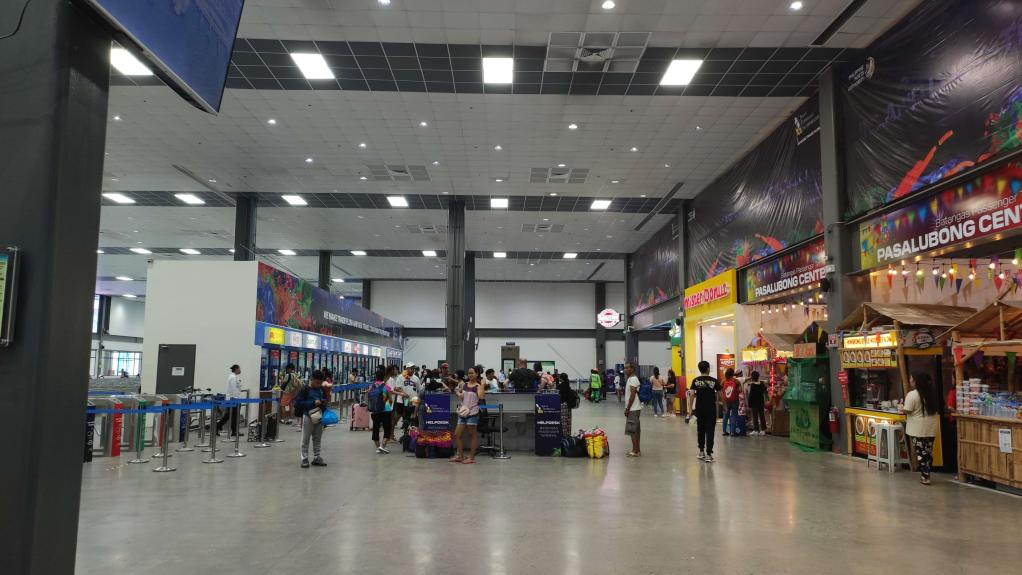
Inside the integrated passenger terminal

Batangas Port serves as one of the primary maritime gateways in Southern Luzon and handles millions of passengers annually. However, the passenger terminal has also faced criticism regarding congestion, unofficial fixers and solicitors targeting travelers, and occasional delays in vessel departures. Concerns have likewise been raised over maintenance and overcrowding issues affecting some RoRo ferry services operating from the port.

== Administration ==
The Batangas port is under the management of Philippine Ports Authority (PPA), the port administration in the Philippines, created in 1975 and attached to what is now the Department of Transportation (DOTr) for policy and program coordination. Port administration was merged with the traditional function of revenue collection of the Bureau of Customs (BOC). PPA is also vested with the function of undertaking all port construction projects under its port system.

The port falls within the administrative jurisdiction of the Customs Collection District of Batangas or Collection District IV, an area defined by the BOC which comprises the province of Aurora, Batangas, Quezon, Marinduque, Oriental, Occidental Mindoro, and Palawan. Batangas City, which hosts the port, is defined by the customs as the district's principal port of entry while the sub-ports of entry are designated as Puerto Princesa in Palawan and Plaridel, Quezon and Aurora.

== Expansion and development issues ==
In March 2016, Operator Asian Terminals Inc. announce plans to invest ₱3.8 billion primarily to improve port operations in the Batangas port, as well as the Port of Manila. The plan involves increasing the capacity of the port which is projected to accommodate more domestic passengers and international container cargoes.

The port of Batangas can improve its attractiveness in providing competitively-priced electricity or energy to investors and in offering higher quality maritime services. Regulations and ease-of-doing-business policies and standard operating procedures can be improved significantly.

The size of interior roads connecting the port leads to congestion that renders highways and expressways far less effective. The idea that the connection of the port to the Southern Tagalog Arterial Road (STAR Tollway) and South Luzon Expressway (SLEX) without passing through the Batangas City proper was since completed when STAR Tollway became connected with SLEX since December 2010. In addition, the revival or construction of a railway system connecting the Port of Batangas to Metro Manila would certainly accelerate its development.

These topics are regularly debated at the provincial level, particularly during Batangas gubernatorial elections.

On April 26, 2024, President Bongbong Marcos launched the port's expansion project during the Integrated Passenger Terminal building's inauguration.

== See also ==
- List of East Asian ports
