= Padre Garcia =

Municipality in Batangas, Philippines

- Municipality
- Municipality of Padre Garcia
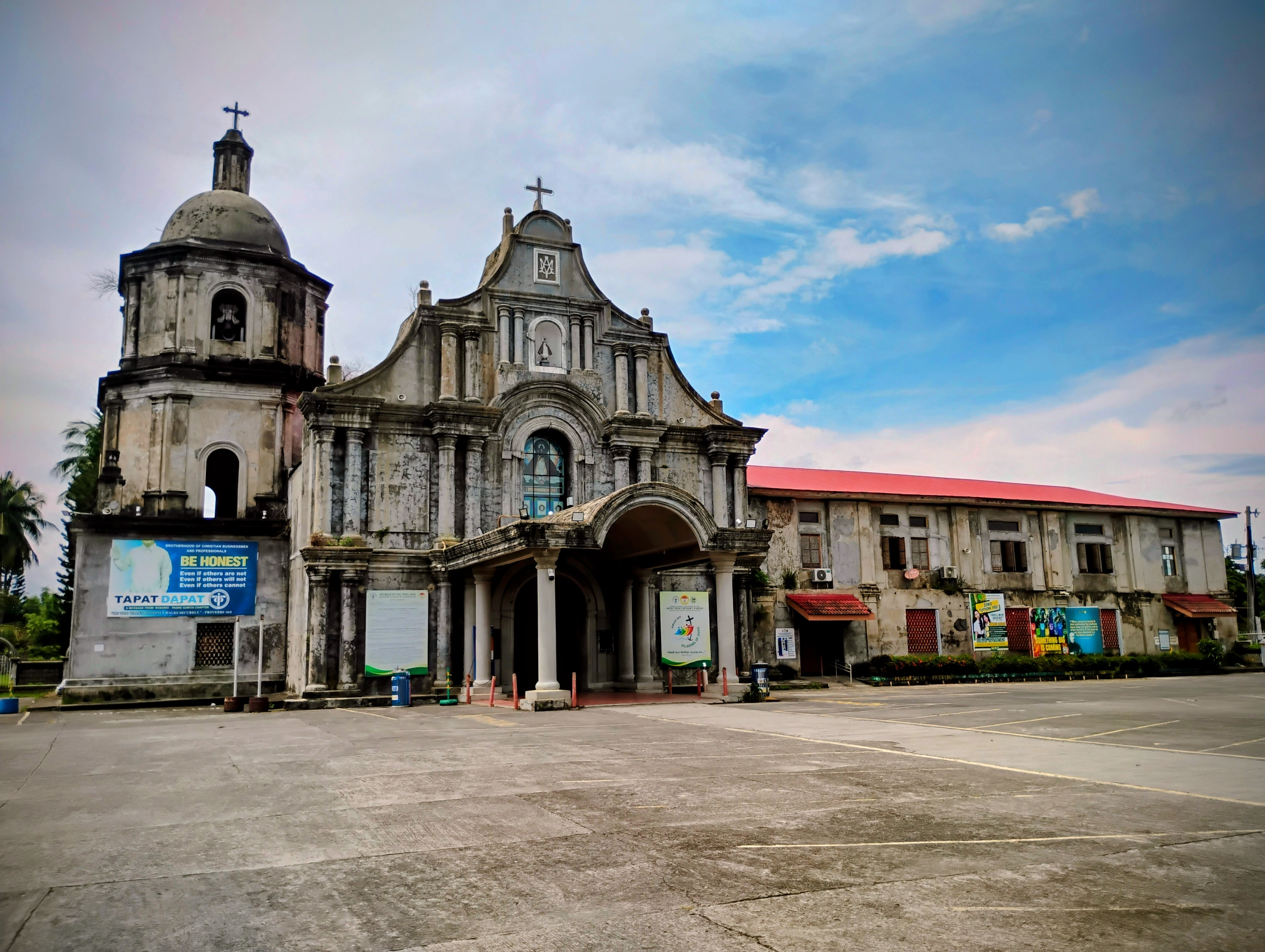
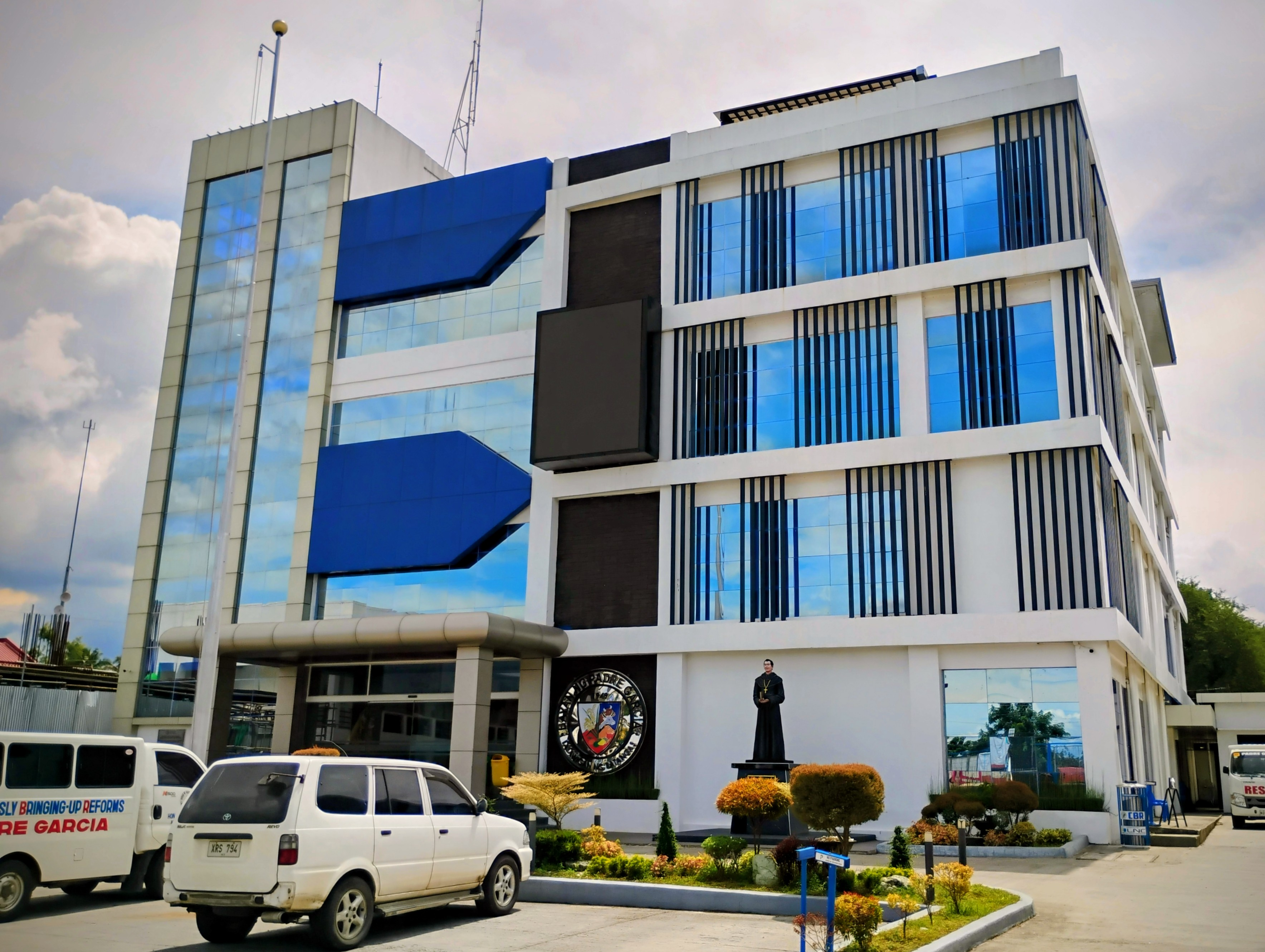
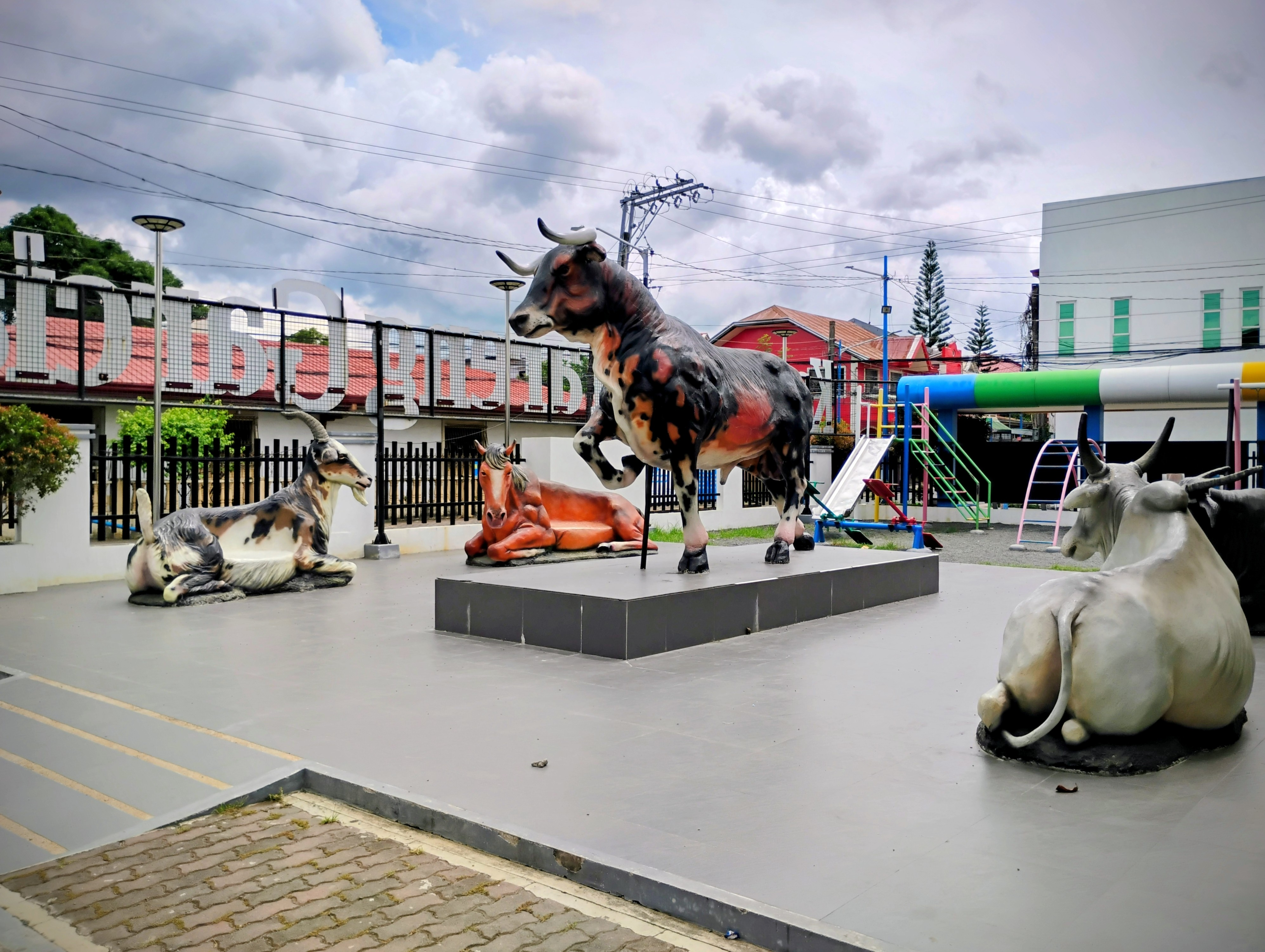
- Most Holy Rosary Parish Church Padre Garcia Municipal Hall Padre Garcia Community Park

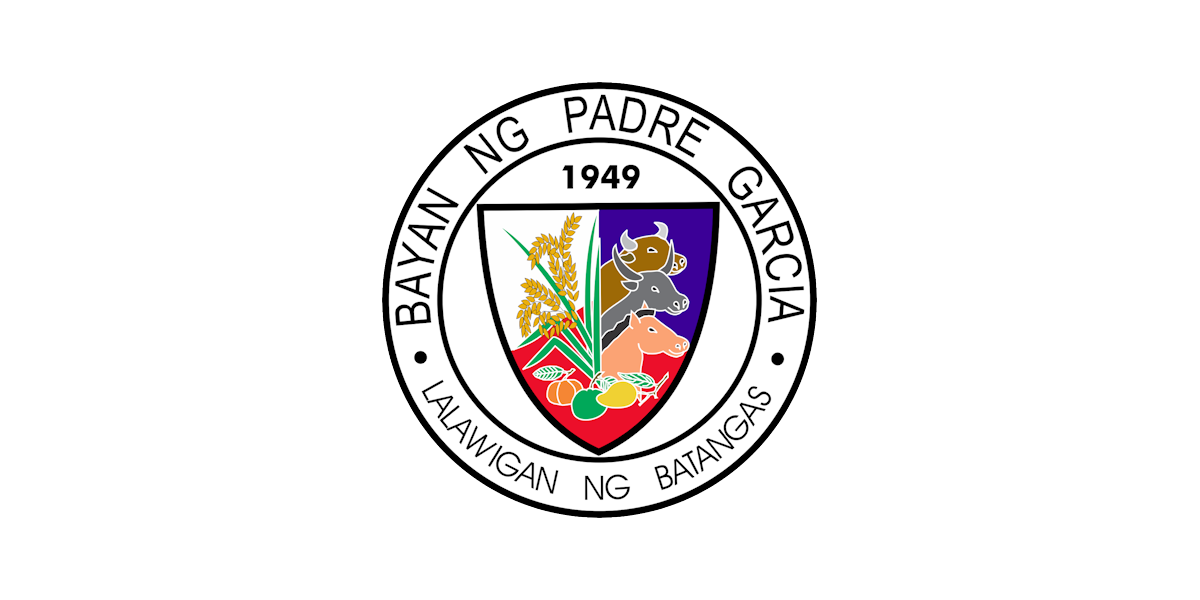
- Flag Seal
- Nickname: Cattle Trading Capital of the Philippines
- Map of Batangas with Padre Garcia highlighted
- Interactive map of Padre Garcia
- Location within the Philippines
- Coordinates: 13°53′N 121°13′E
- Country: Philippines
- Region: Calabarzon
- Province: Batangas
- District: 4th district
- Founded: December 1, 1949
- Named for: Fr. Vicente García
- Barangays: 18 (see Barangays)

Government
  - Type: Sangguniang Bayan
  - Mayor: Celsa B. Rivera
  - Vice Mayor: Micko Angelo B. Rivera
  - Representative: Amado Carlos A. Bolilia IV
  - Municipal Council: Members: Luningning C. Vidal; Leandro C. Linatoc; Francisco D. Bathan; Ferdinand G. Villar; Mona Liza C. Rivera-Gutierrez; Rico A. Araño; Erwin B. Estole; Roy R. Flores
  - Electorate: 34,545 voters (2025)

Area
  - Total: 41.51 km^{2} (16.03 sq mi)
- Elevation: 158 m (518 ft)
- Highest elevation: 985 m (3,232 ft)
- Lowest elevation: 35 m (115 ft)

Population (2024 census)
  - Total: 53,526
  - Density: 1,289/km^{2} (3,340/sq mi)
  - Households: 11,778

Economy
  - Income class: 1st municipal income class
  - Poverty incidence: 10.7% (2023)
  - Revenue: ₱ 342.8 million (2024)
  - Assets: ₱ 1,119 million (2024)
  - Expenditure: ₱ 164.1 million (2024)
  - Liabilities: ₱ 502 million (2024)

Service provider
  - Electricity: Batangas 2 Electric Cooperative (BATELEC 2)
- Time zone: UTC+8 (PST)
- ZIP code: 4224
- PSGC: 0401020000
- IDD : area code: 4224
- Native languages: Tagalog
- Website: www.padregarcia.gov.ph/home

Padre Garcia, officially the Municipality of Padre Garcia (Tagalog: Bayan ng Padre Garcia), is a first class municipality in the province of Batangas, Philippines. According to the 2024 census, it has a population of 53,526 people.

It is recognized as the "Cattle Trading Capital of the Philippines," being notable for its strong agricultural heritage, highlighted by the town’s bustling cattle market, locally known as the bakahan. This livestock auction market has developed into the largest in Southern Tagalog, attracting traders from various regions and serving as a major contributor to the local economy.

== Etymology ==
Padre Garcia's old name is Lumang Bayan, as it is the former seat of government of the neighboring town of Rosario. The town is named for one of its most famous sons, Padre Vicente García, a native of Barangay Maugat. He was one of the first defenders of José Rizal's Noli Me Tángere, and he was friends with Rizal were friends during the struggle for Philippine independence from Spain.

== History ==
The town was originally part of Rosario and known as Lumang Bayan or Sambat. It officially became a separate municipality on December 1, 1949 through Executive Order No. 279 signed by President Elpidio Quirino on October 11, 1949, with José A. Pesigan and Rústico K. Recto as the first elected mayor and vice mayor, respectively. It originally consisted of barrios Banaba, Banay-banay, Bawi, Castillo, Maugat, Lumang Bayan (población), Pansol, Payapa, Quilo-quilo, San Miguel, San Felipe, and Tangob.

In 1952, the town council founded the cattle market or bakahan in direct competition to the established one of neighboring Rosario. This resulted in rivalry, intimidation, and violence at times, but the market succeeded and became the biggest in Southern Tagalog. Cattle trade happens every Friday of the week.

=== Contemporary ===
On July 28, 2023, the new five-storey municipal hall of Padre Garcia was inaugurated.

== Geography ==
Padre Garcia is located at 13°53′N 121°13′E. It is 27 kilometers (17 mi) from Batangas City, 132 kilometers (82 mi) from Manila, 53 kilometers (33 mi) from Lucena, and 11 kilometers (6.8 mi) from Lipa. It is bounded on the north and northwest by Lipa; east by San Antonio, Quezon; and south and southwest by Rosario.

According to the Philippine Statistics Authority, the municipality has a land area of 41.51 square kilometers (16.03 sq mi) constituting 1.33% of the 3,119.75-square-kilometer (1,204.54 sq mi) total area of Batangas.

=== Barangays ===
Padre Garcia is politically subdivided into 18 barangays, as shown in the matrix below. Each barangay consists of puroks and some have sitios.

PSGC	Barangay	Population			±% p.a.	
		2024		2010		
041020001	Banaba	6.2%	3,322	3,209	▴	0.24%
041020002	Banaybanay	4.3%	2,312	2,259	▴	0.16%
041020014	Bawi	6.8%	3,639	3,264	▴	0.76%
041020015	Bukal	4.4%	2,330	2,078	▴	0.80%
041020016	Castillo	3.3%	1,791	1,558	▴	0.97%
041020017	Cawongan	6.6%	3,544	3,162	▴	0.79%
041020018	Manggas	2.2%	1,176	1,056	▴	0.75%
041020019	Maugat East	1.5%	806	955	▾	−1.17%
041020020	Maugat West	3.8%	2,059	1,915	▴	0.50%
041020021	Pansol	8.7%	4,660	4,343	▴	0.49%
041020022	Payapa	5.7%	3,071	2,590	▴	1.19%
041020023	Poblacion	6.6%	3,536	3,560	▾	−0.05%
041020024	Quilo‑quilo North	5.5%	2,955	2,699	▴	0.63%
041020025	Quilo‑quilo South	6.1%	3,283	2,867	▴	0.94%
041020026	San Felipe	7.5%	4,022	3,798	▴	0.40%
041020027	San Miguel	5.9%	3,133	3,139	▾	−0.01%
041020028	Tamak	1.4%	772	682	▴	0.86%
041020029	Tangob	3.5%	1,891	1,743	▴	0.57%
	Total		53,526	44,877	▴	1.23%

=== Climate ===
Climate data for Padre Garcia, Batangas
Month	Jan	Feb	Mar	Apr	May	Jun	Jul	Aug	Sep	Oct	Nov	Dec	Year
Mean daily maximum °C (°F)	26 (79)	27 (81)	29 (84)	31 (88)	30 (86)	29 (84)	28 (82)	28 (82)	28 (82)	28 (82)	27 (81)	26 (79)	28 (83)
Mean daily minimum °C (°F)	20 (68)	19 (66)	20 (68)	21 (70)	23 (73)	23 (73)	23 (73)	23 (73)	23 (73)	22 (72)	21 (70)	21 (70)	22 (71)
Average precipitation mm (inches)	52 (2.0)	35 (1.4)	27 (1.1)	27 (1.1)	82 (3.2)	124 (4.9)	163 (6.4)	144 (5.7)	145 (5.7)	141 (5.6)	100 (3.9)	102 (4.0)	1,142 (45)
Average rainy days	12.0	8.1	8.8	9.7	17.9	22.6	26.2	24.5	24.6	22.0	16.7	14.9	208
Source: Meteoblue

== Demographics ==
Population census of Padre Garcia
Year	Pop.	±% p.a.
1960	10,708	—
1970	15,498	+3.76%
1975	17,541	+2.51%
1980	19,591	+2.23%
1990	25,958	+2.85%
1995	28,959	+2.07%
2000	34,504	+3.83%
2007	42,942	+3.06%
2010	44,877	+1.62%
2015	48,302	+1.41%
2020	51,853	+1.50%
2024	53,526	+0.77%
Source: Philippine Statistics Authority

In the 2024 census, Padre Garcia had a population of 53,526 people. The population density was 1,300 inhabitants per square kilometer (3,400/sq mi).

== Economy ==
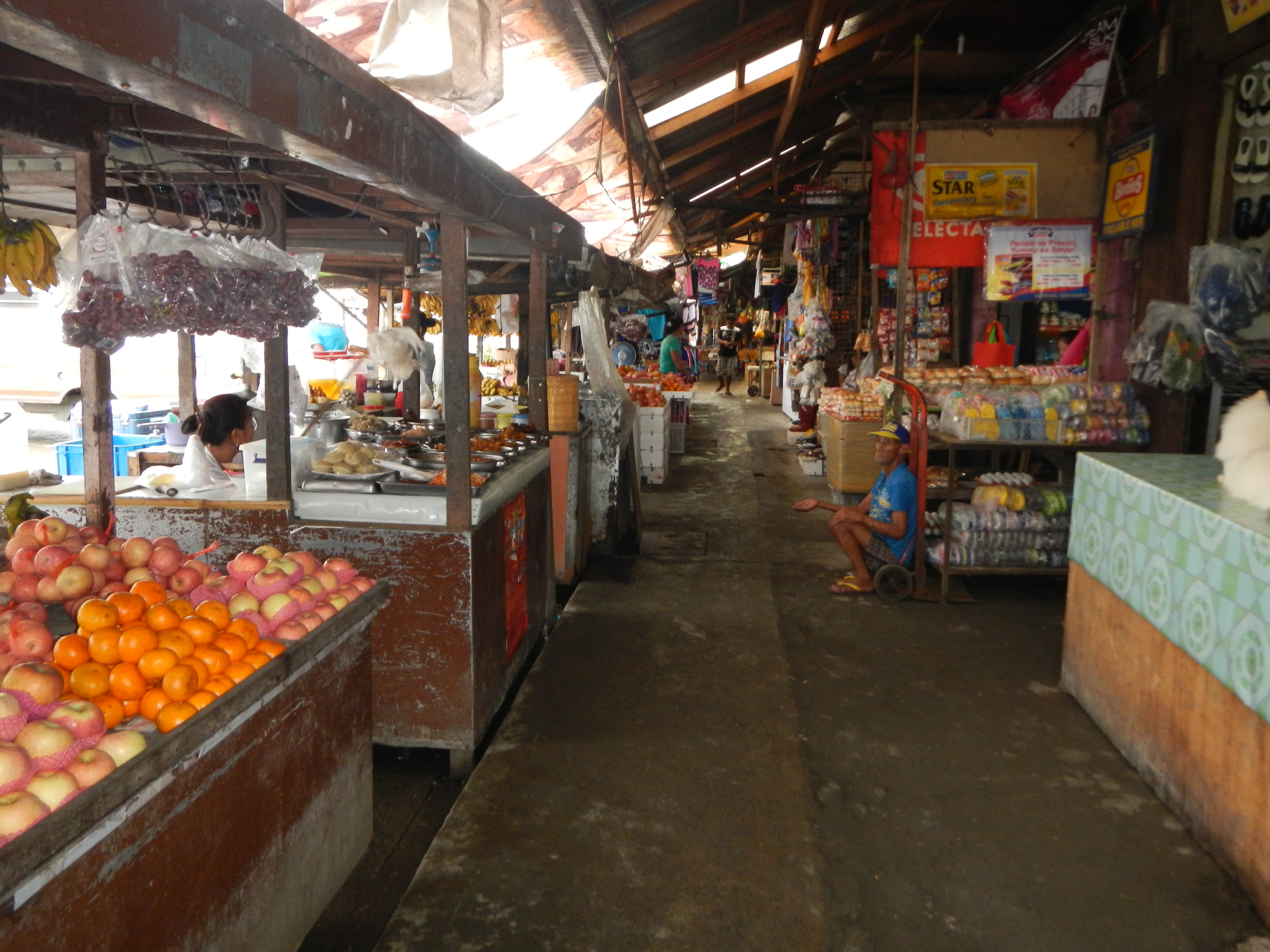
Inside the Padre Garcia Market

Poverty incidence of Padre Garcia (%)

Source: Philippine Statistics Authority

== Education ==
The Padre Garcia Schools District Office governs all educational institutions within the municipality. It oversees the management and operations of all private and public, from primary to secondary schools.

=== Primary and elementary schools ===
- Ages and Stages School of Padre Garcia Batangas
- Banaba Elementary School
- Bawi Elementary School
- Bukal Elementary School
- Castillo Elementary School
- Cawongan Elementary School
- Domingo M. Zuno Elementary School
- Holy Family Academy
- Holy Trinity School
- Magnum Opus Formation School
- Manggas-Tamak Elementary School
- Maugat East Elementary School
- Paaralang Elementarya ng Banaybanay
- Padre Garcia Central School
- Pansol Elementary School
- Payapa Elementary School
- Quilo-Quilo Elementary School
- Quilo-Quilo North Elementary School
- San Felipe Elementary School
- San Miguel Elementary School
- Tangob Elementary School
- Touching Minds Learning Center

=== Secondary schools ===
- Bukal Integrated National High School
- Padre Garcia National High School
- Pansol Integrated National High School

== Gallery ==
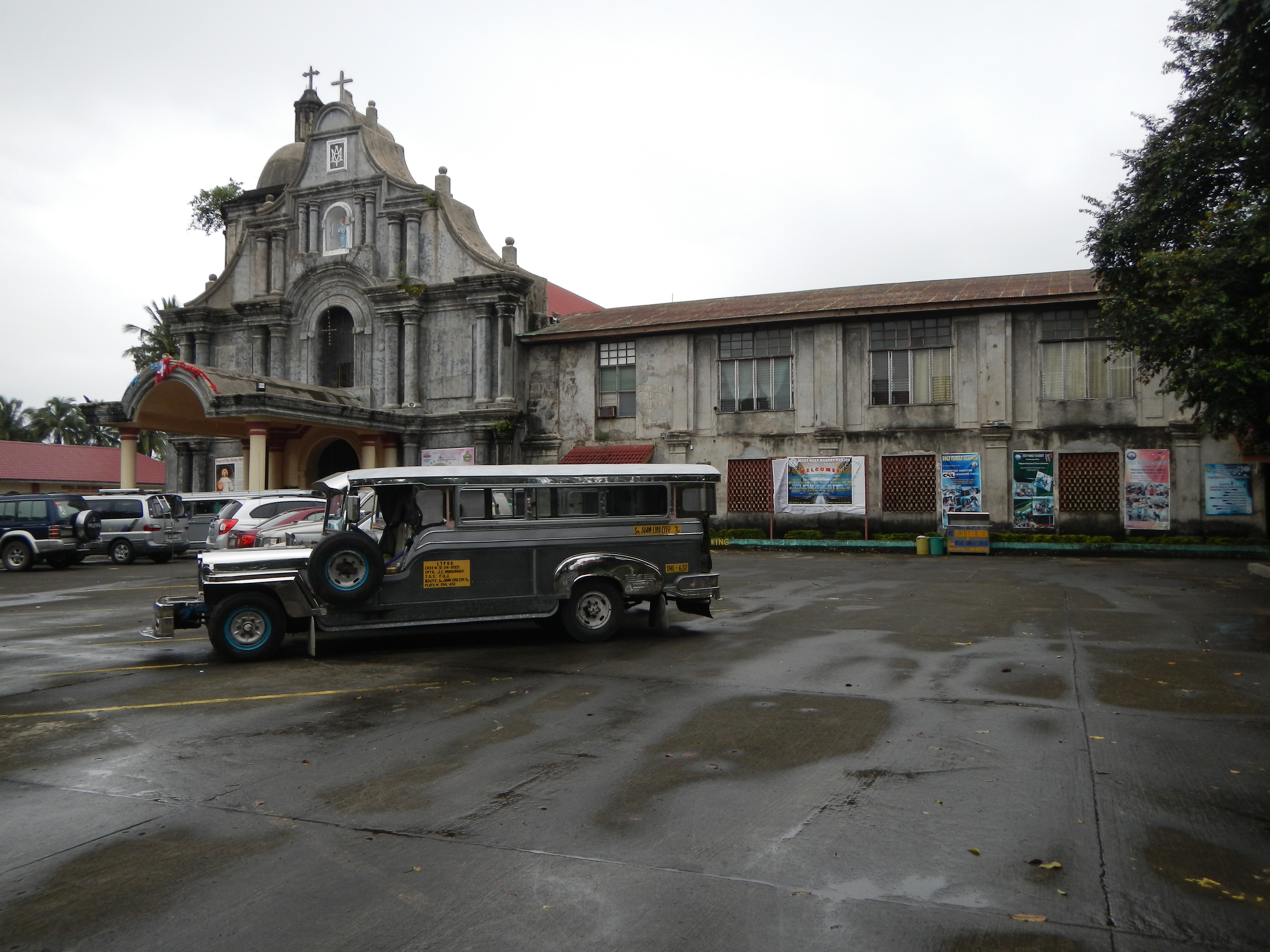
Parish of the Most Holy Rosary

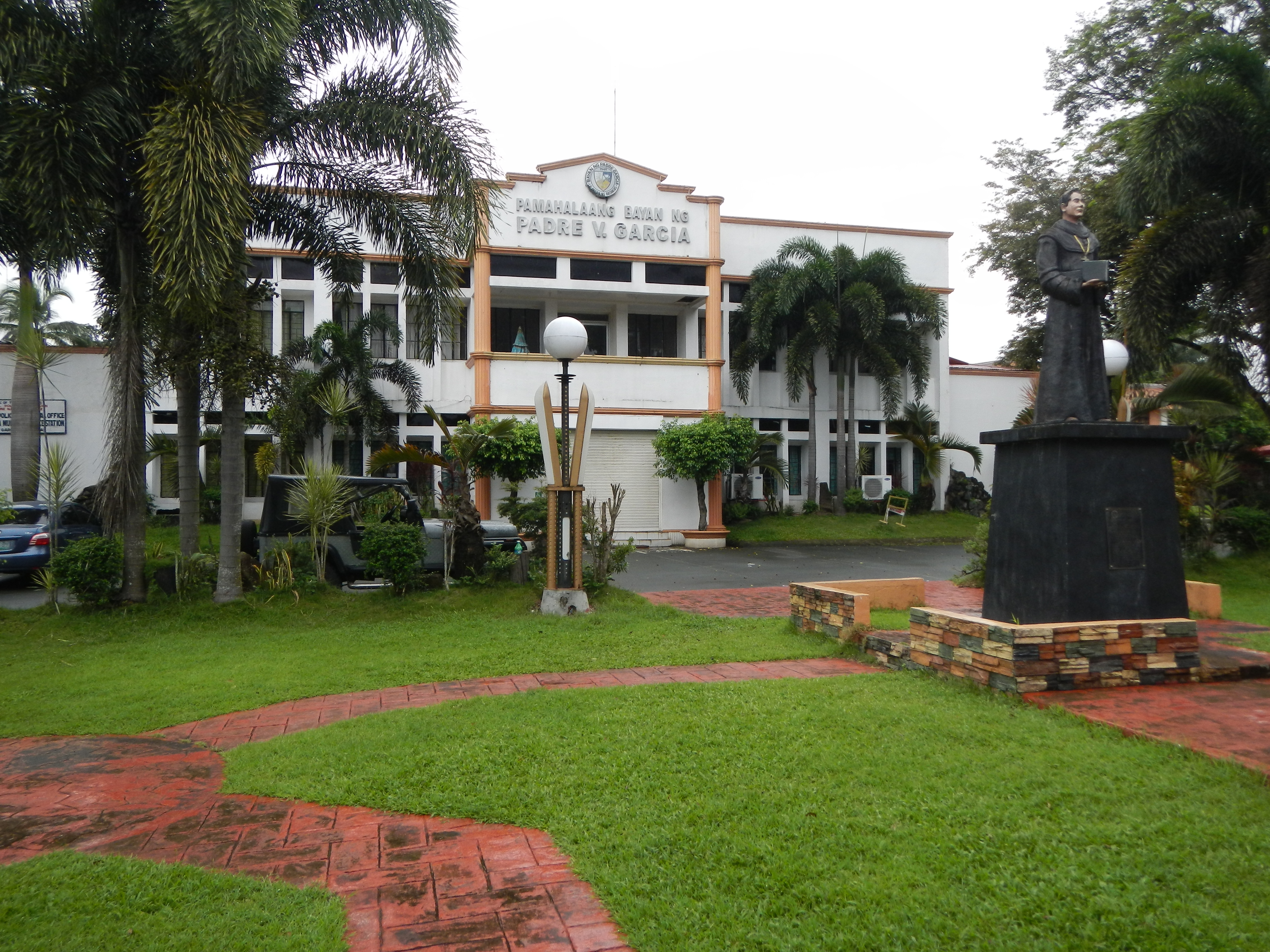
Old municipal hall

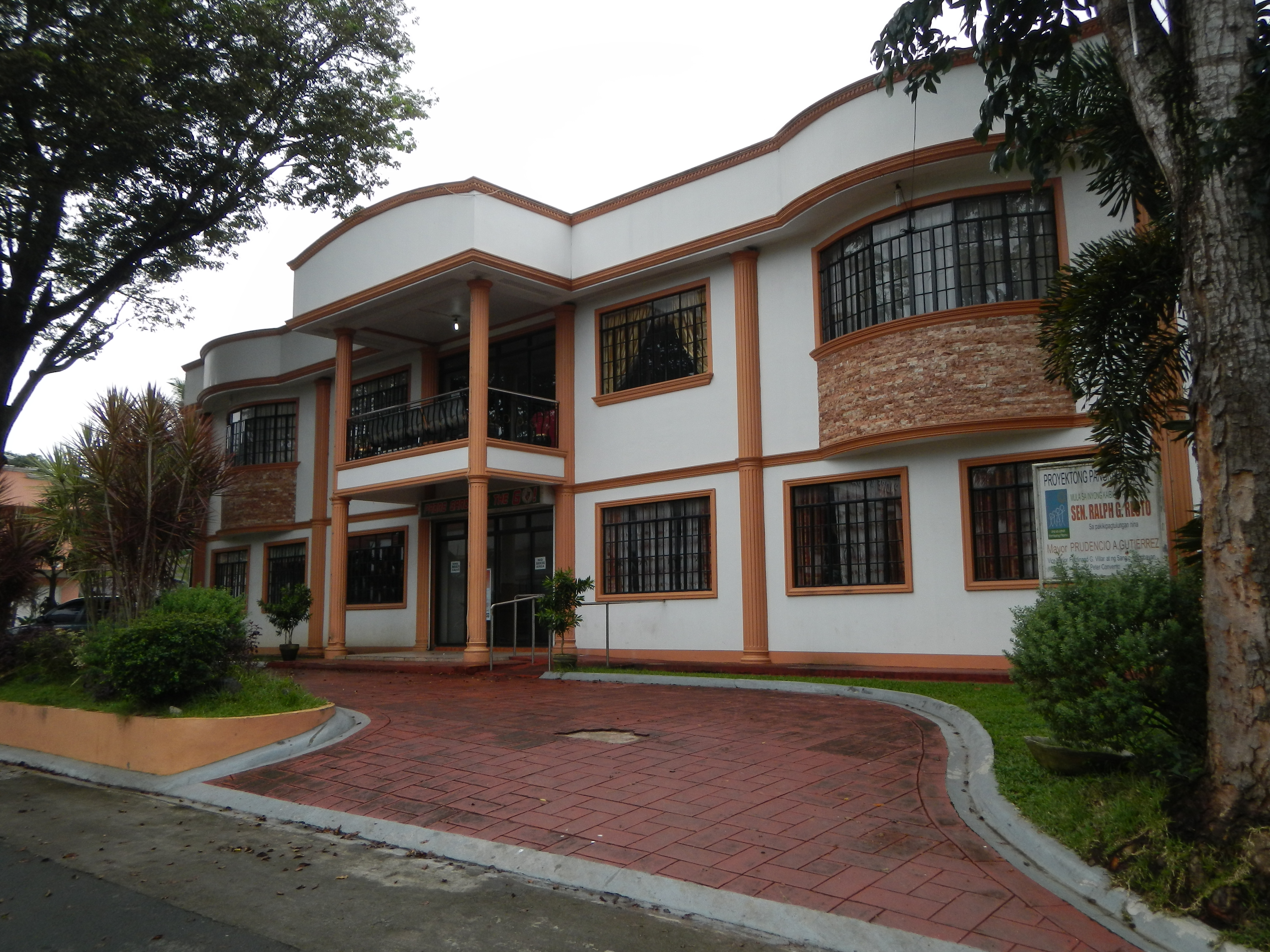
Padre Garcia Health Center

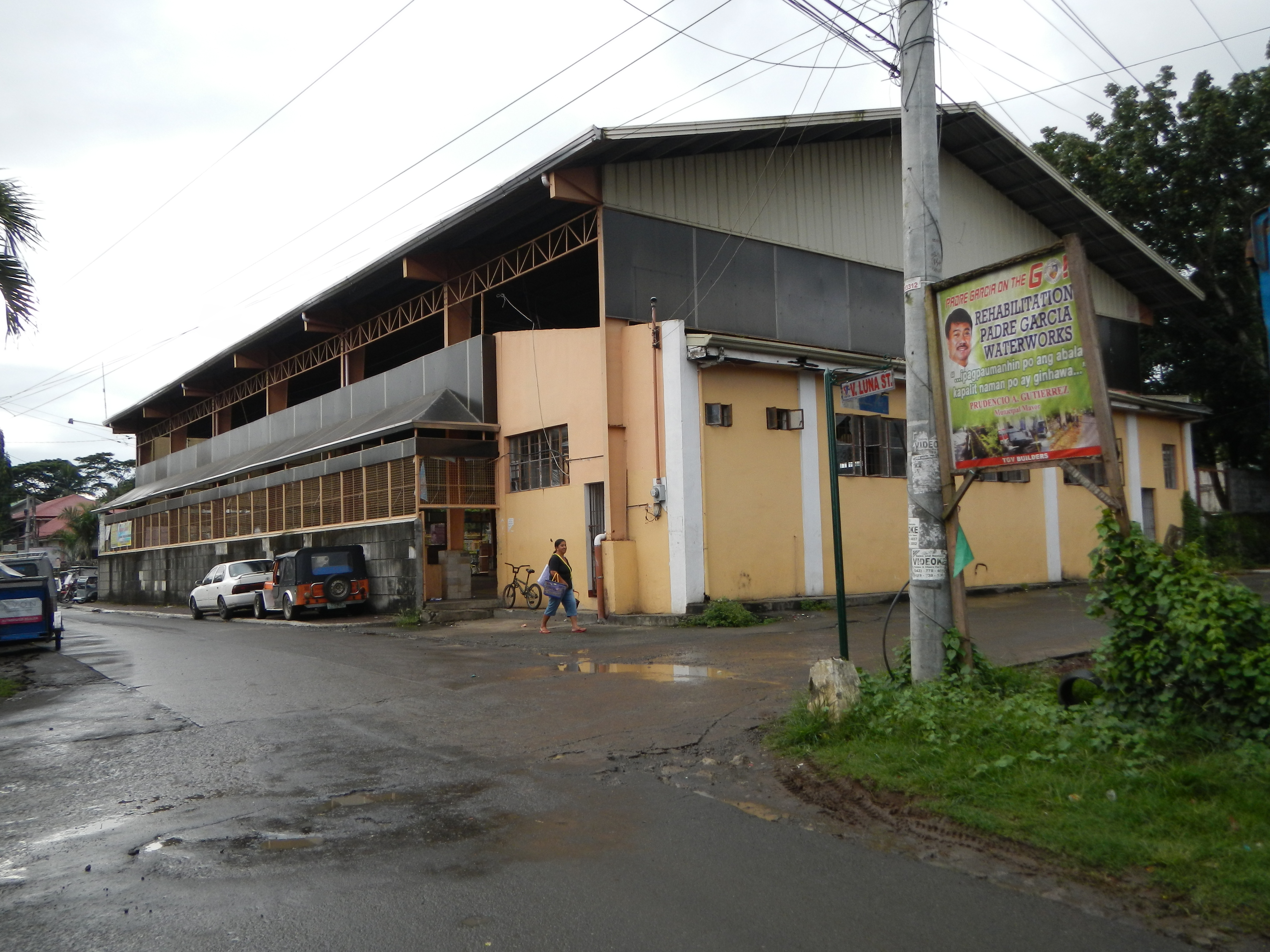
Multi-purpose Hall
