= UAAP Golf Tournament =

Tournament information
- Established: 2026
- Course: Tagaytay Midlands Golf Club
- Par: 72
- Organized by: University Athletic Association of the Philippines and Pilipinas Golf Tournaments, Inc
- Month played: May

Location map
- Location within Luzon

The UAAP Golf Tournament is a golf competition among member-schools of the University Athletic Association of the Philippines (UAAP). Golf will be a demonstration sport within the UAAP.

== History ==
Prior to golf's inclusion in the calendar of the multi-sport collegiate league, University Athletic Association of the Philippines (UAAP), its member schools such as the University of the Philippines, Ateneo de Manila University, De La Salle University, and the University of Santo Tomas had already taken part in intercollegiate golf tournaments outside the UAAP system.

On the sidelines of the UAAP Invitational Golf Tournament at The Country Club in Santa Rosa, Laguna on April 20, 2026, held in the middle of UAAP Season 88, UAAP and the Pilipinas Golf Tournaments, Inc. (PGTI) signed a three-year contract incorporating golf as a demonstration sport within the UAAP.

The inaugural UAAP Golf Tournament was held from May 11 to 14 at the Tagaytay Midlands in Tagaytay, Cavite featuring both individual and team events.

== Winners ==
=== Men's individual ===
| Year | Season | Gold | Score | Silver | Score | Bronze | Score | Venue | Ref. |
|---|---|---|---|---|---|---|---|---|---|
| 2026 | Season 88 | Perry Bucay ( La Salle) | 293 | Joshua Buenaventura ( UP) | 300 | Zach Castro ( La Salle) | 304 | Tagaytay Midlands | |

=== Women's individual ===
| Year | Season | Gold | Score | Silver | Score | Bronze | Score | Venue | Ref. |
|---|---|---|---|---|---|---|---|---|---|
| 2026 | Season 88 | Julia Lua ( La Salle) | 330 | Alexa Dacanay ( La Salle) | 300 | Monique Mendoza ( Ateneo) | 343 | Tagaytay Midlands | |

=== Men's team ===
| Year | Season | Gold | Score | Silver | Score | Bronze | Score | Venue | Ref. |
|---|---|---|---|---|---|---|---|---|---|
| 2026 | Season 88 | La Salle | 898 | UP | 928 | Ateneo | 938 | Tagaytay Midlands | |

=== Women's team ===
| Year | Season | Gold | Score | Silver | Score | Bronze | Score | Venue | Ref. |
|---|---|---|---|---|---|---|---|---|---|
| 2026 | Season 88 | La Salle | 1,056 | Ateneo | 1,077 | UP | 1,138 | Tagaytay Midlands | |
