= Tagaytay Hospital and Medical Center =

Private hospital in Cavite, Philippines

Tagaytay Medical Center
- Mount Grace Hospitals, Inc.

Geography
- Location: Tagaytay, Cavite, Philippines
- Coordinates: 14°06′55″N 120°57′40″E

Organization
- Type: for profit hospital

Services
- Emergency department: Yes
- Beds: 50 to 100

History
- Former names: Tagaytay Hospital and Medical Center; Unihealth Tagaytay Hospital and Medical Center
- Founded: May 15, 2009

Links
- Website: https://tagaytaymed.com.ph/

Tagaytay Medical Center, formerly Tagaytay Hospital and Medical Center and Unihealth Tagaytay Hospital and Medical Center, is a private hospital located within Fora Filinvest Mall at Aguinaldo Highway, Silang Crossing East, Tagaytay, Cavite, Philippines. This hospital is located along a ridge. Its construction began in 2005, the year it started out with an out-patient clinic and a diagnostic center as Tagaytay Hospital Systems, Inc., and ended in 2009. It has 50 to 100 inpatient beds and has laboratory and diagnostic services. The RX Pinoy website says Tagaytay Hospital is preparing to become involved with international medical tourism. This means it is promoting itself in foreign countries, where the cost of performing many medical procedures is very costly. However, it has not obtained any status with international healthcare bodies, such as Joint Commission International. MakatiMed, a healthcare group in Manila in 2010 partnered with Tagaytay Hospital to bring the hospital into its care network. Since 2013, the hospital is managed by Mount Grace Hospitals, Inc.
