= Tagaytay Highlands =

Mountain resort in Cavite, Philippines

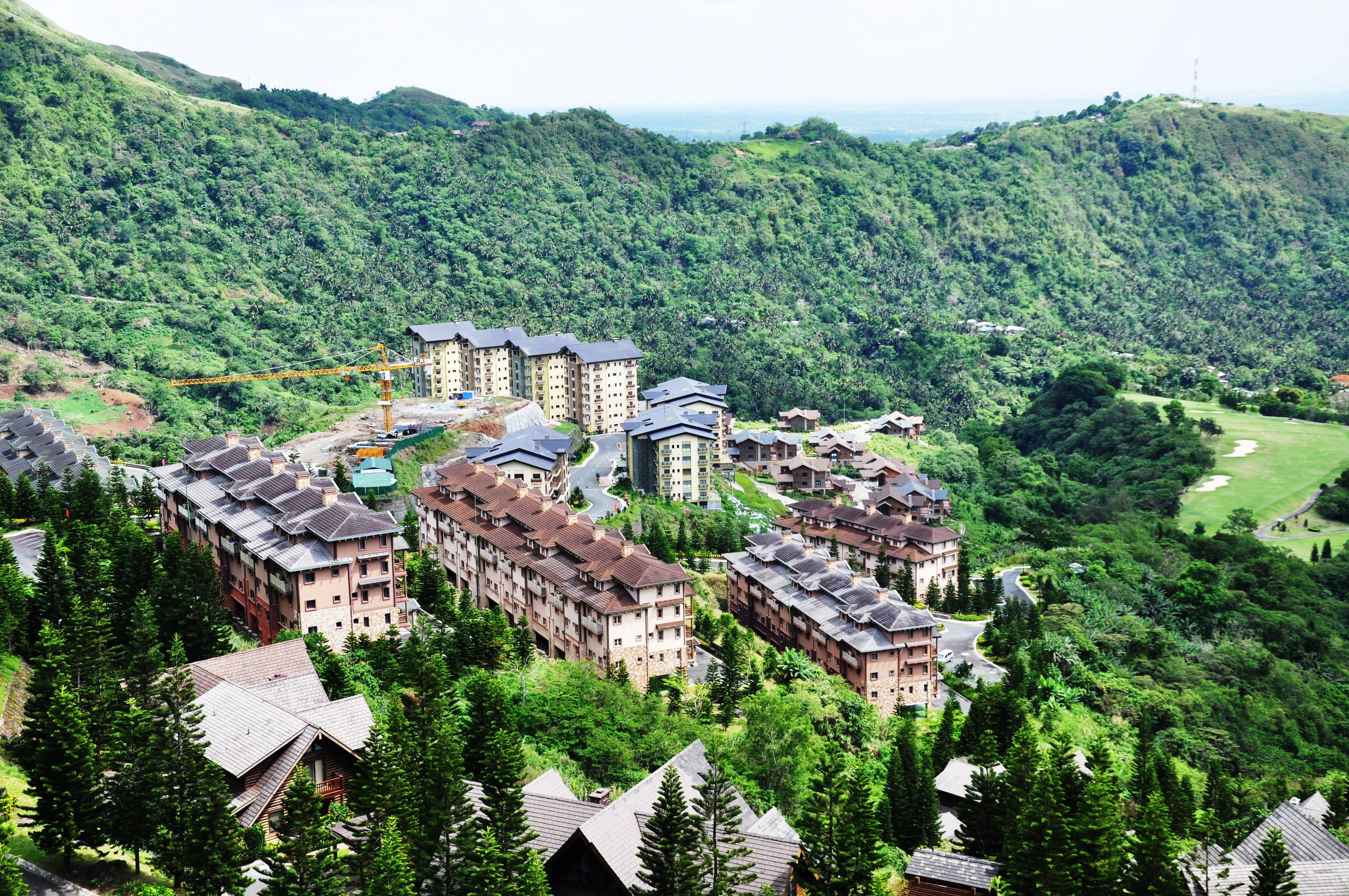

Project
- Opening date: March 1994; 31 years ago
- Operator: Belle Corporation
- Website: www.tagaytayhighlands.com

Location
- Coordinates: 14°08′06″N 121°01′44″E
- Location: Philippines; Tagaytay, Cavite; Talisay and Tanauan, Batangas

Tagaytay Highlands is a mountain resort and mixed-use development situated in Tagaytay, Cavite, Philippines, with parts under the jurisdiction of Talisay and Tanauan in Batangas.

== History ==
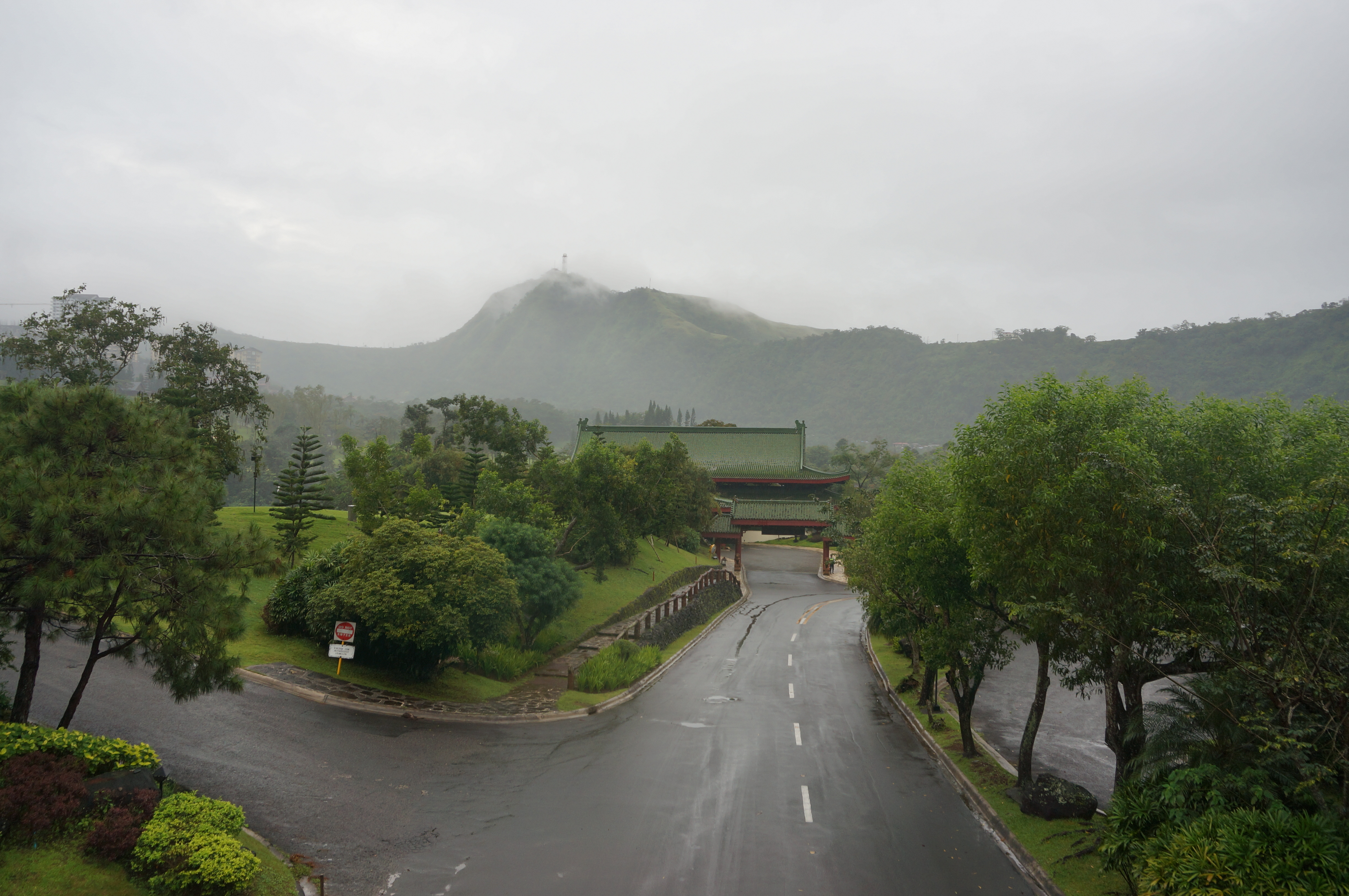
Tagaytay Highlands near The Country Club

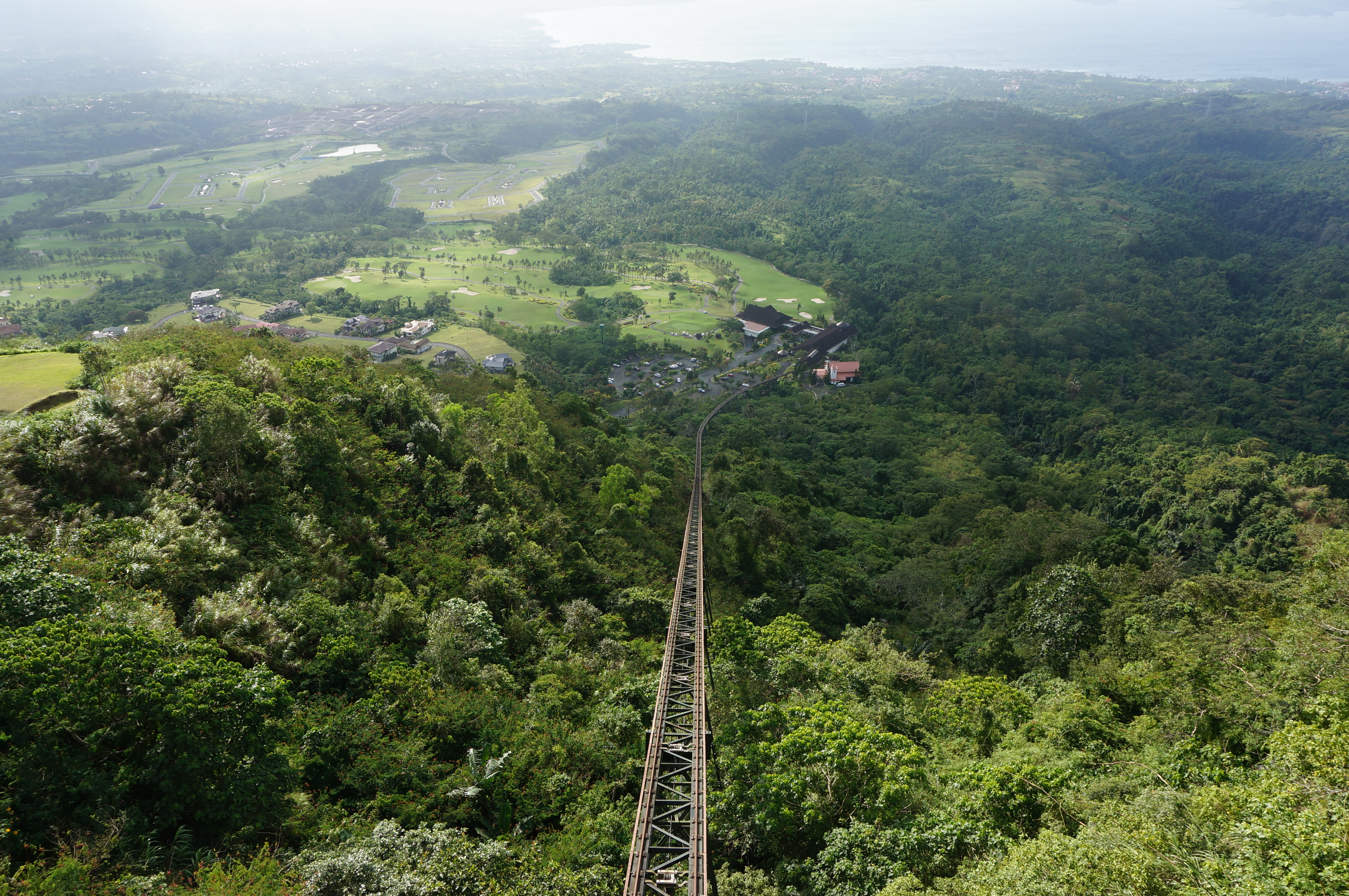
Track of the Tagaytay Highlands Funicular Train connecting the highlands and midlands of the resort.

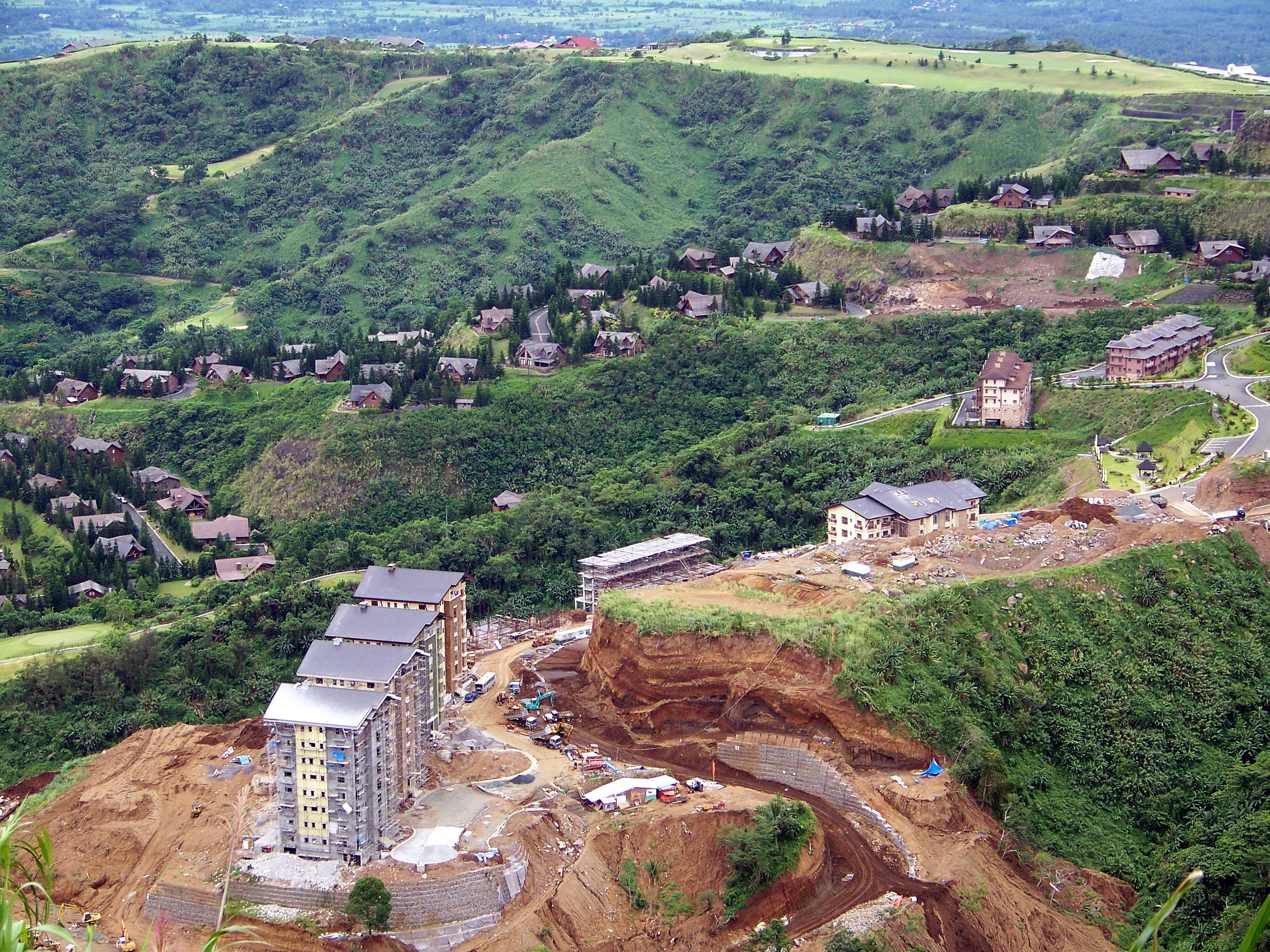
Construction of condominiums in the Tagaytay Highlands, 2008.

Willy Ocier of Belle Corporation was behind the concept of Tagaytay Highlands and patterned it after the life he wished for himself and his family, which he deemed acceptable to the growing population of young professionals of his time. He conceptualized the development as a place for people in the city, particularly in Metro Manila to escape the busy city life. Henry Sy of the SM Group influenced Ocier to enter the property development industry.

Ocier, who was looking for a business partner for Tagaytay Highlands approached Sy, who declined. Sy was skeptical due to Tagaytay's rugged terrain. However Sy's prediction of Tagaytay becoming the next recreation center for Metro Manila residents in the 1980s led Ocier to invest in Tagaytay. Ocier decided to push through with his father, Benito Tan Guat's support. Roberto Ongpin was a partner of Ocier in the project.

Tagaytay Highlands would later be established in April 1994.

Tagaytay Highlands, including its golf course, are among the establishments affected by ash fall caused by 2020 Taal Volcano eruption.

On April 27, 2024, Hans Sy, Willy Ocier and Jerry Tiu led the 30th anniversary milestone celebration.

== Residential developments ==
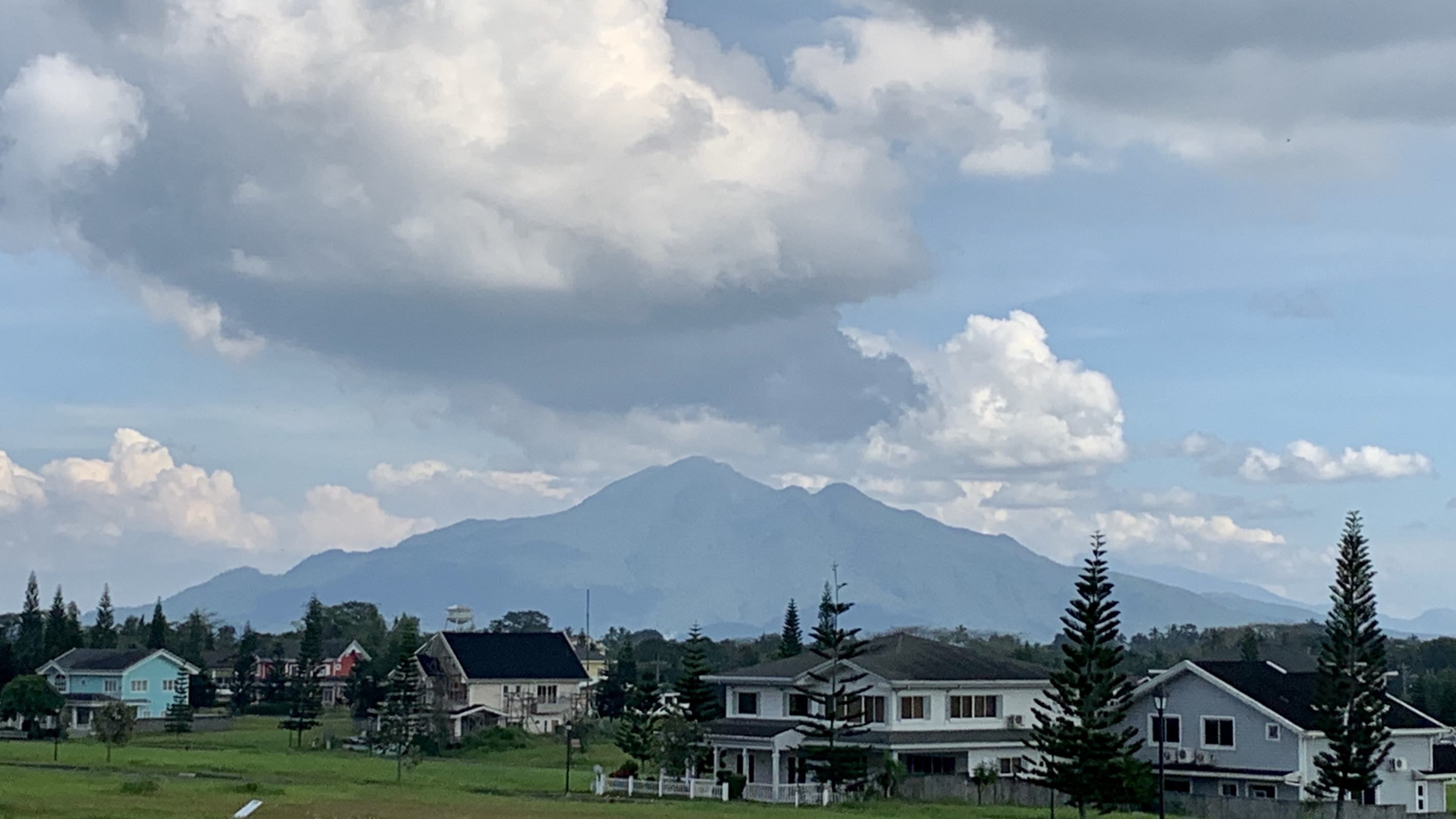
Tagaytay Midlands

Residential areas are being developed within the mountain resort and are divided into three parts namely Highlands, Midlands, and Greenlands.

Among the developments inside the Highlands area of the Tagaytay Highlands is the Woodridge Place, a condominium complex composed of 9 buildings. The architectural design of the buildings were inspired from the designs of mountain resort and ski lodge buildings in Colorado, United States. A residential area patterned after the mountain resort town of Aspen, Colorado named Aspenhills is situated also within the Highlands.

In the Midlands, are residential developments patterned from architecture from different countries. Among these is Katsura which was derived from the Katsura Palace in Kyoto, Japan.

In April 2024, Highlands opened "Trealva", a 320-hectare (790-acre) sanctuary-mountain resort at Midlands West.

== Sport ==
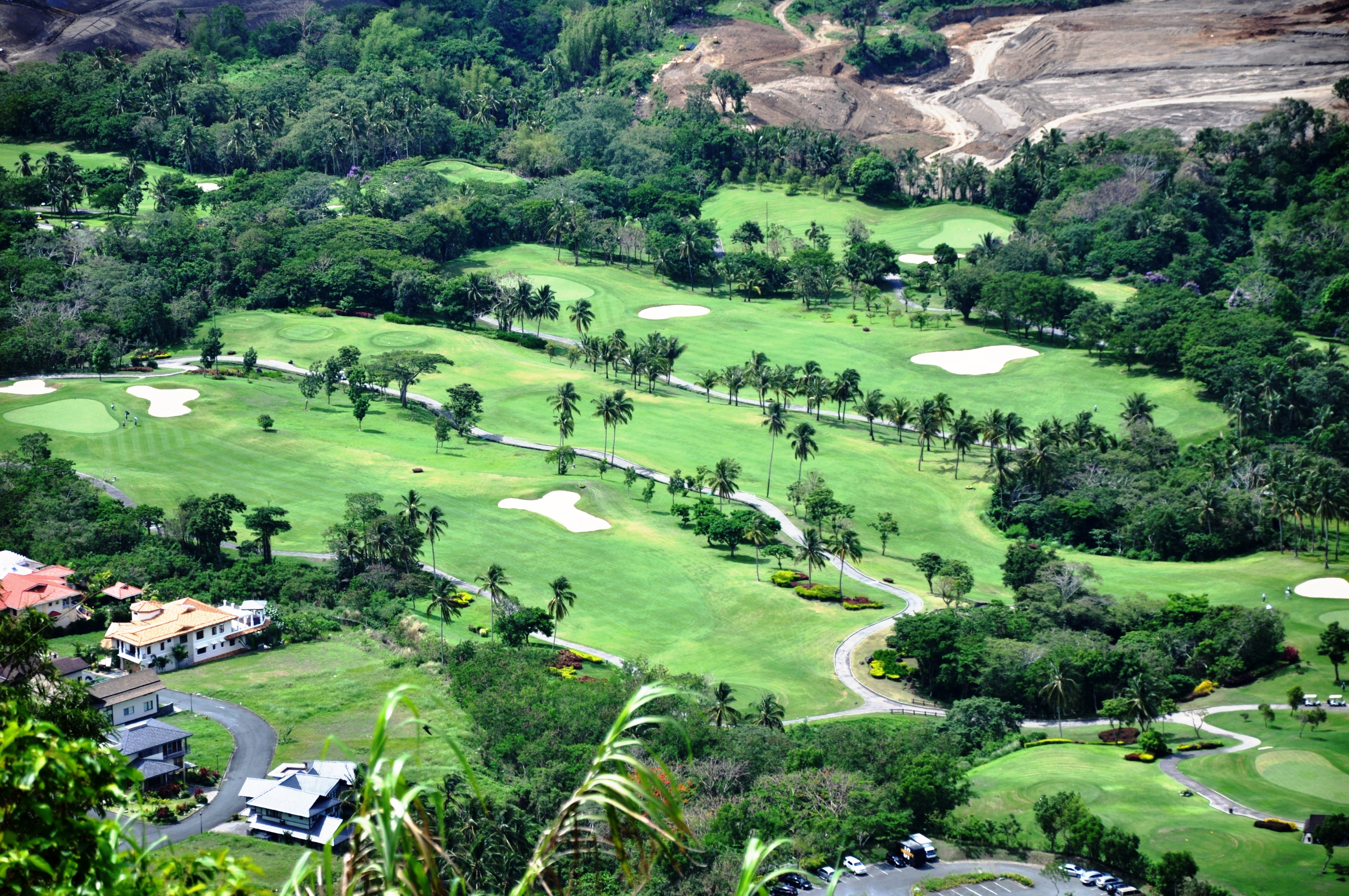
Tagaytay Highlands golf course

Tagaytay Highlands hosts sporting facilities at its Sports Center which has a swimming pool, a basketball court, billiard hall, a bowling alley, tennis, badminton, and squash courts, as well as a children's playground.

There are two golf courses in Tagaytay Highlands which includes the Lucky 9 golf course, the first 45-hole golfing resort in Tagaytay.
