= Tagaytay =

Component city in Cavite, Philippines

- Component city
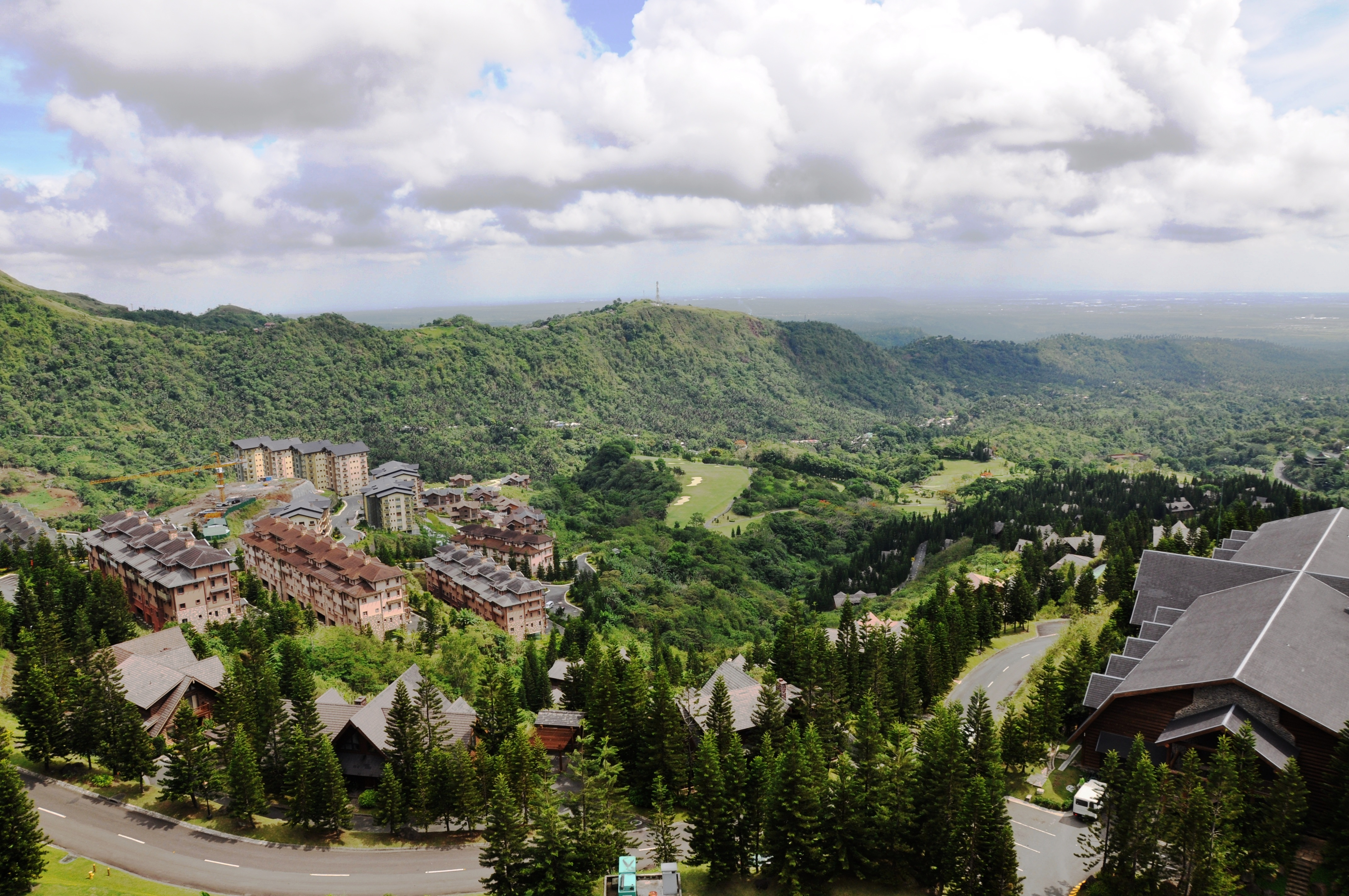
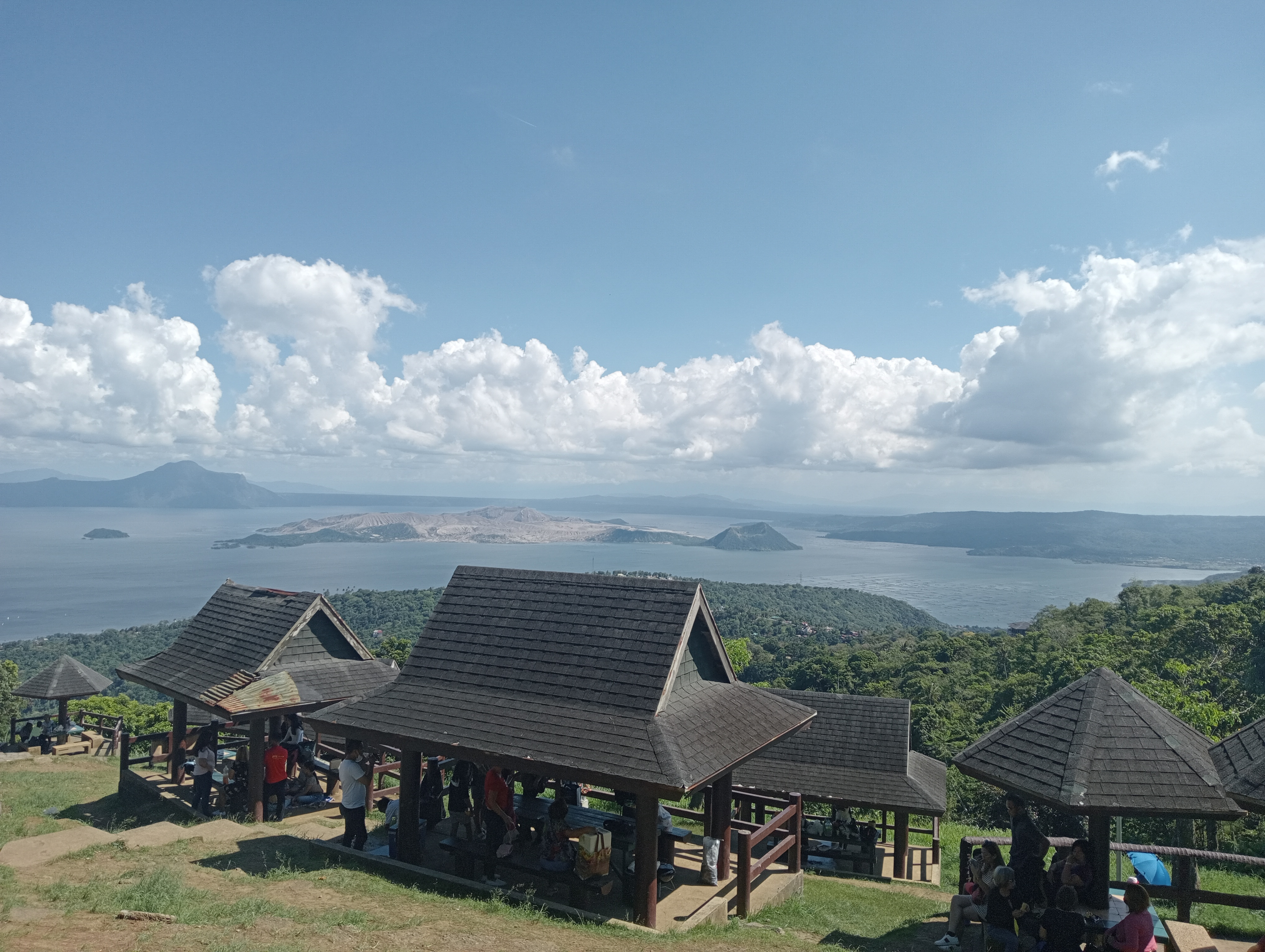
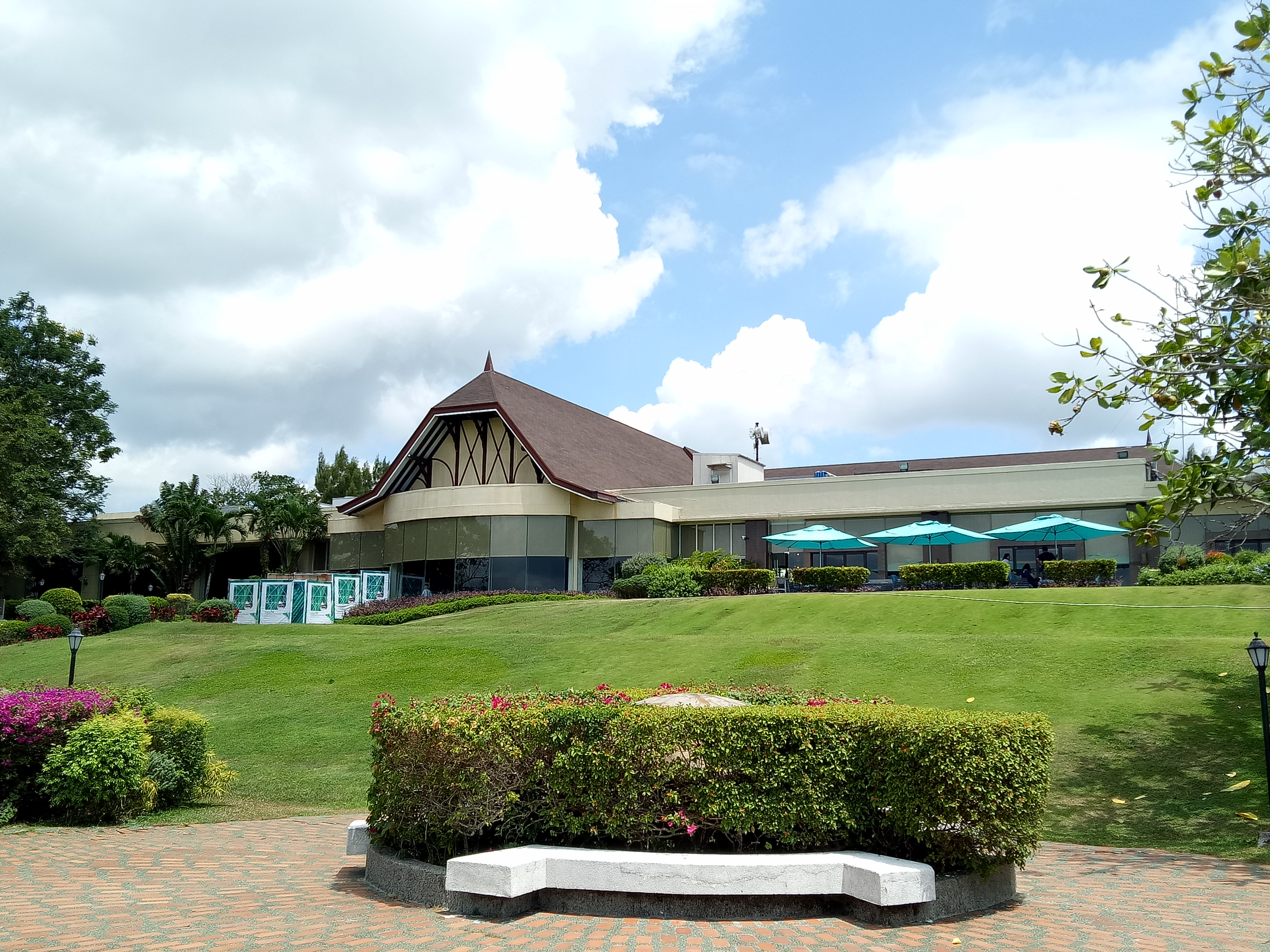
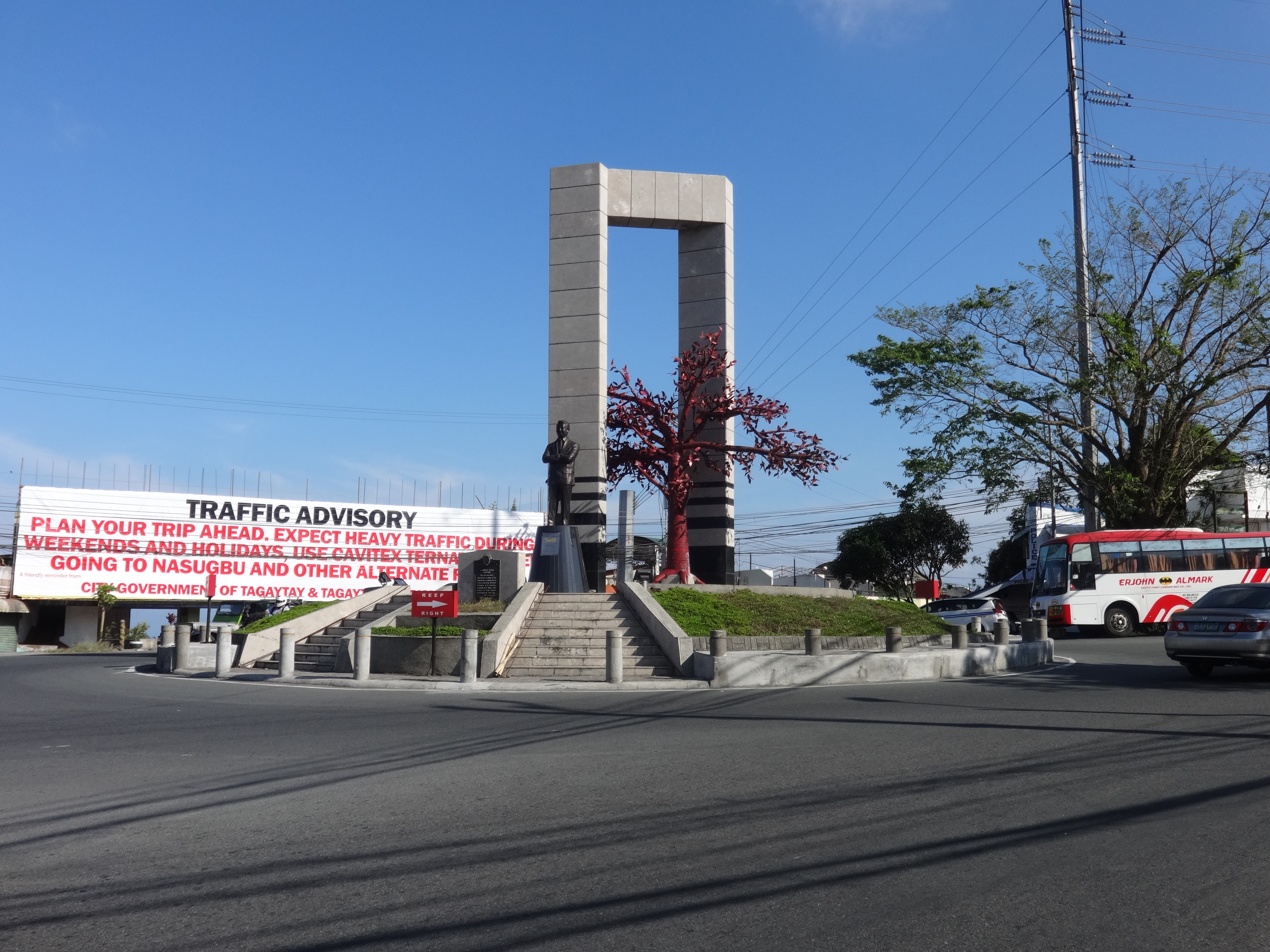
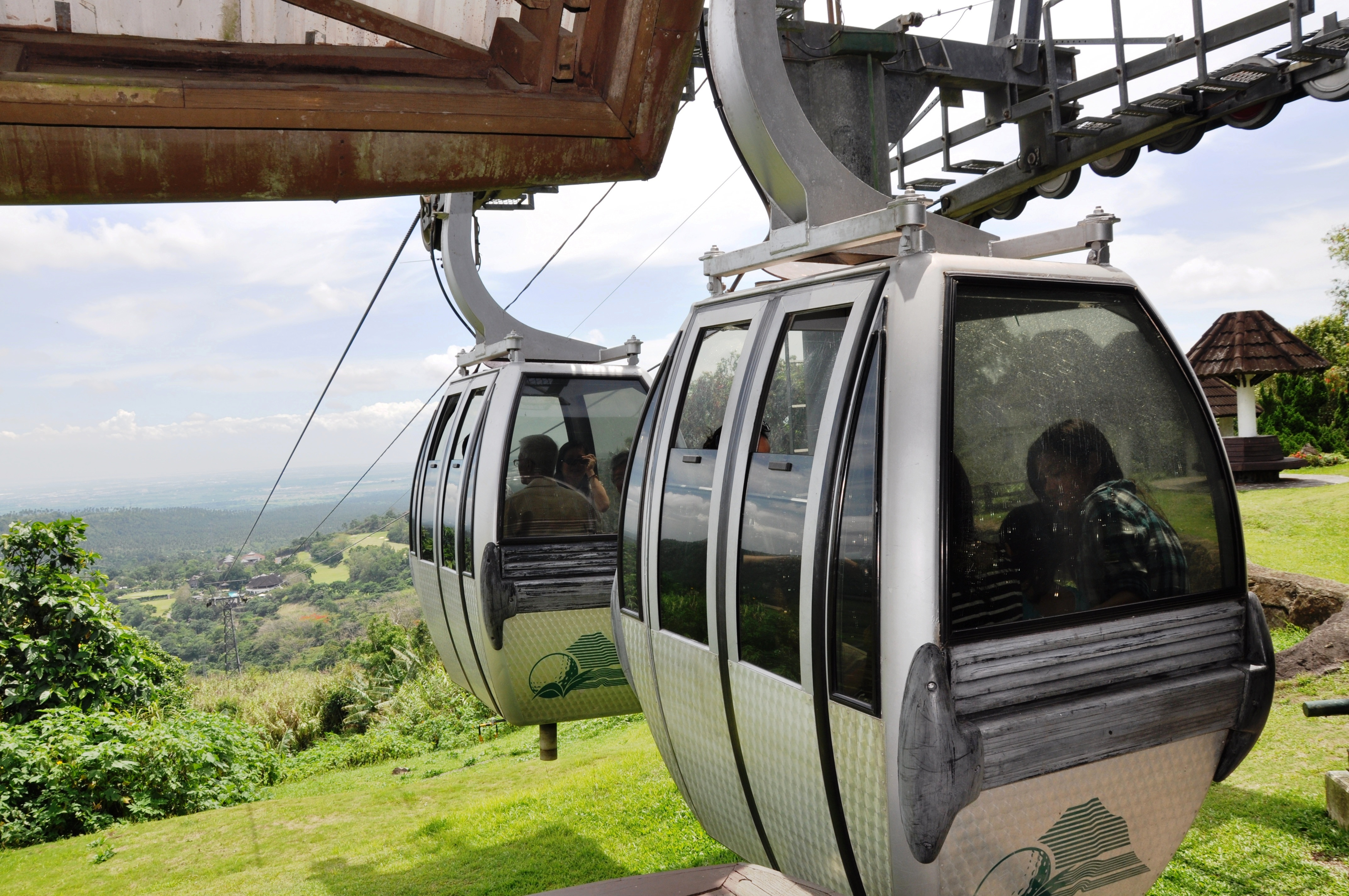
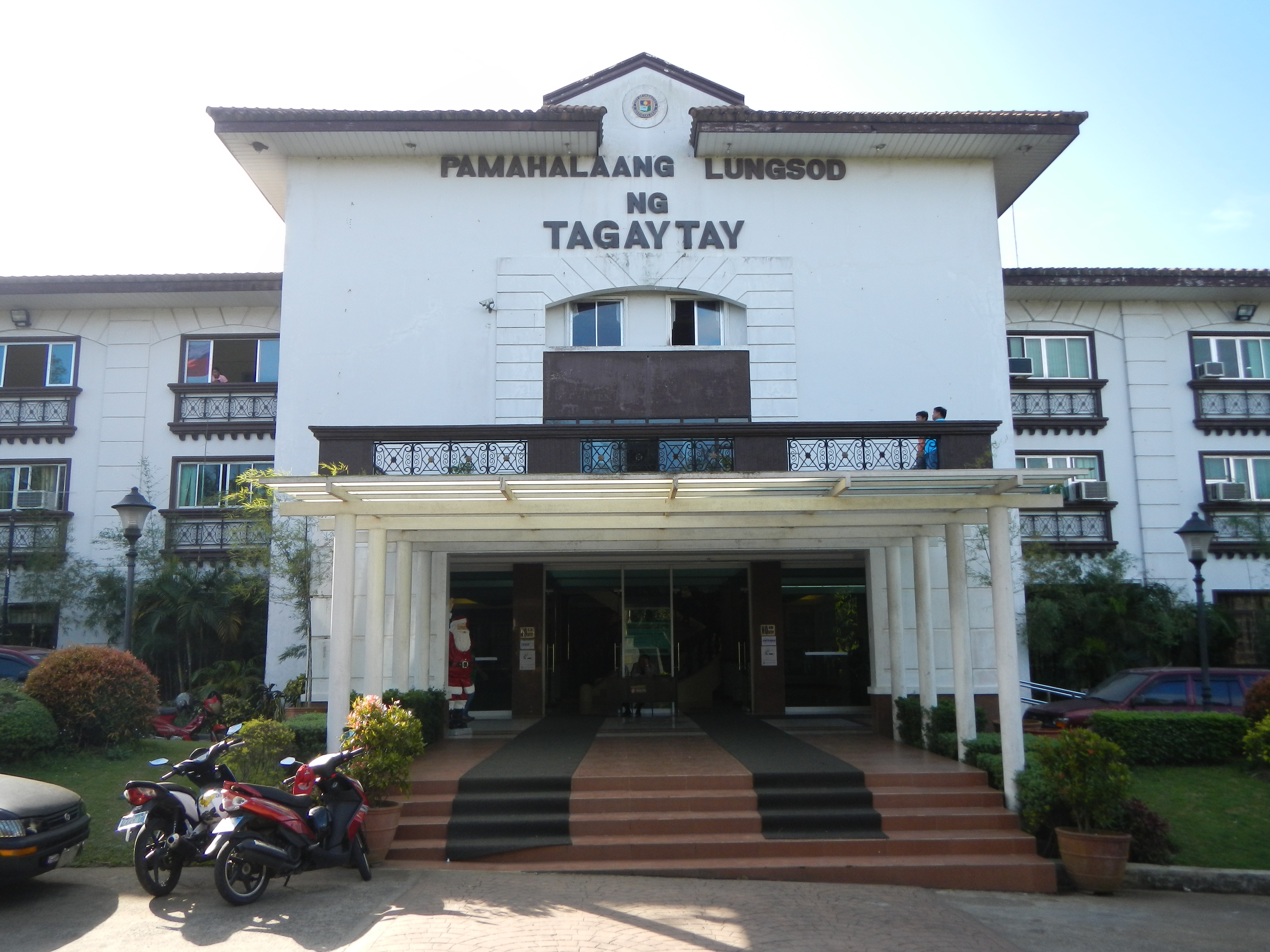
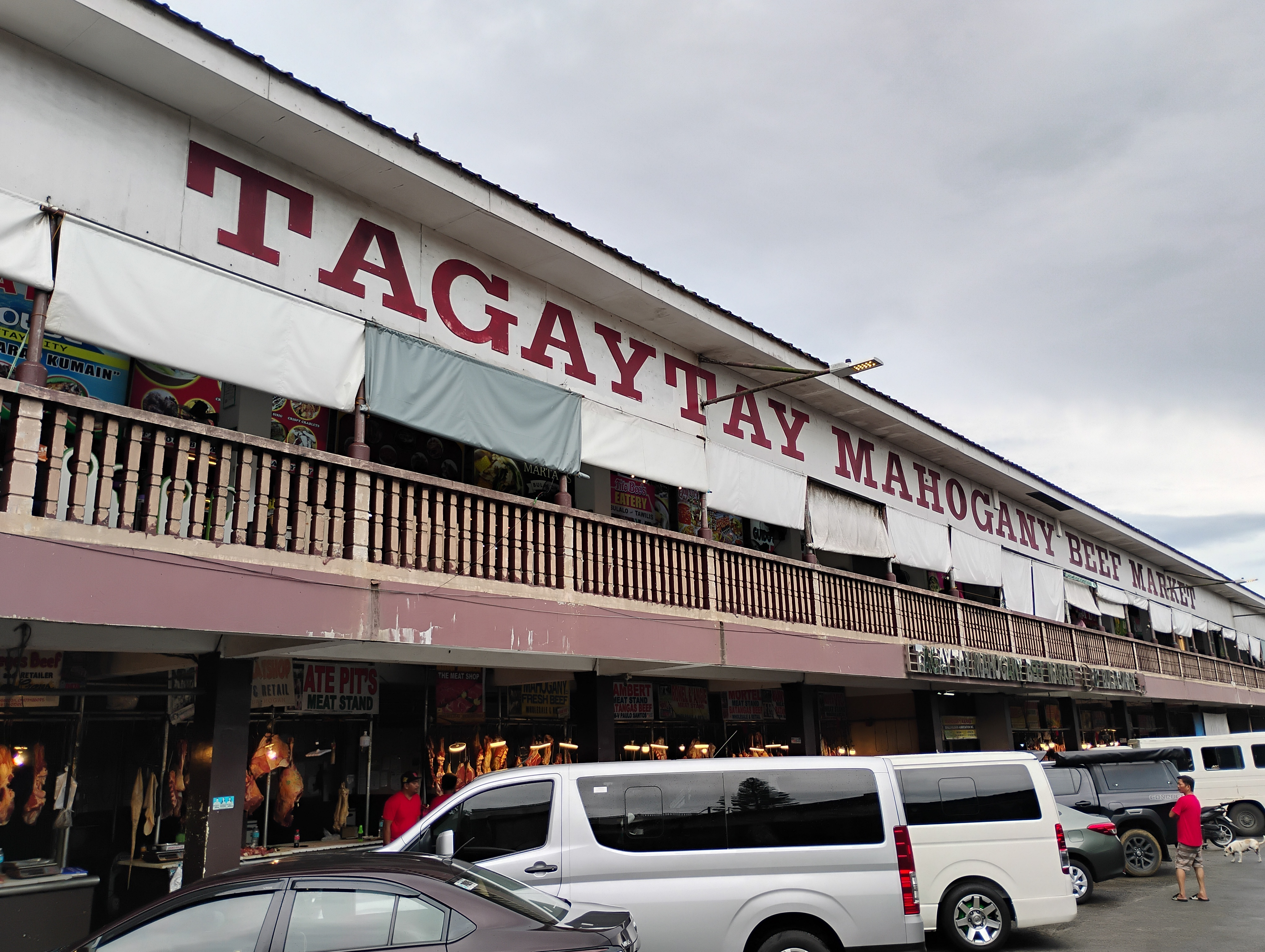
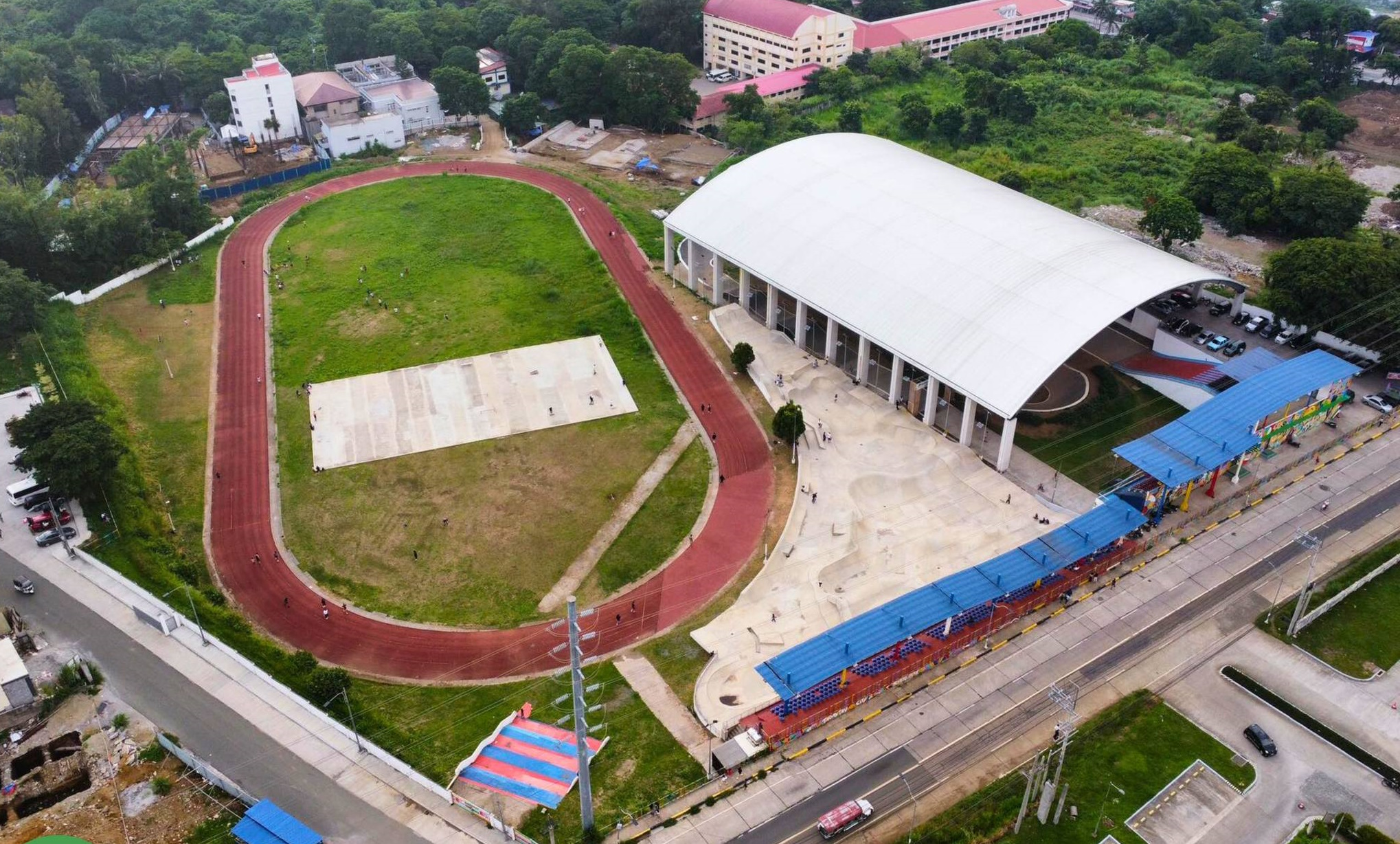
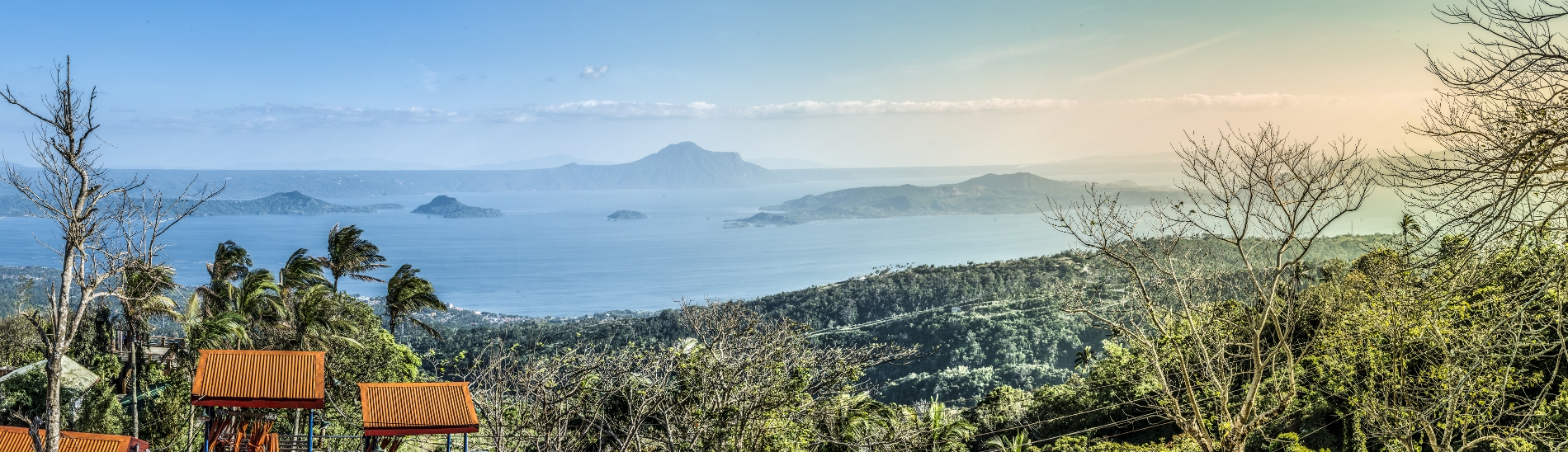
- Tagaytay Highlands Tagaytay Picnic Grove Taal Vista Hotel Tagaytay Rotonda Cable Car in Tagaytay Highlands Old Tagaytay City Hall Tagaytay Mahogany Beef Market Tagaytay City Sports Complex Taal Lake

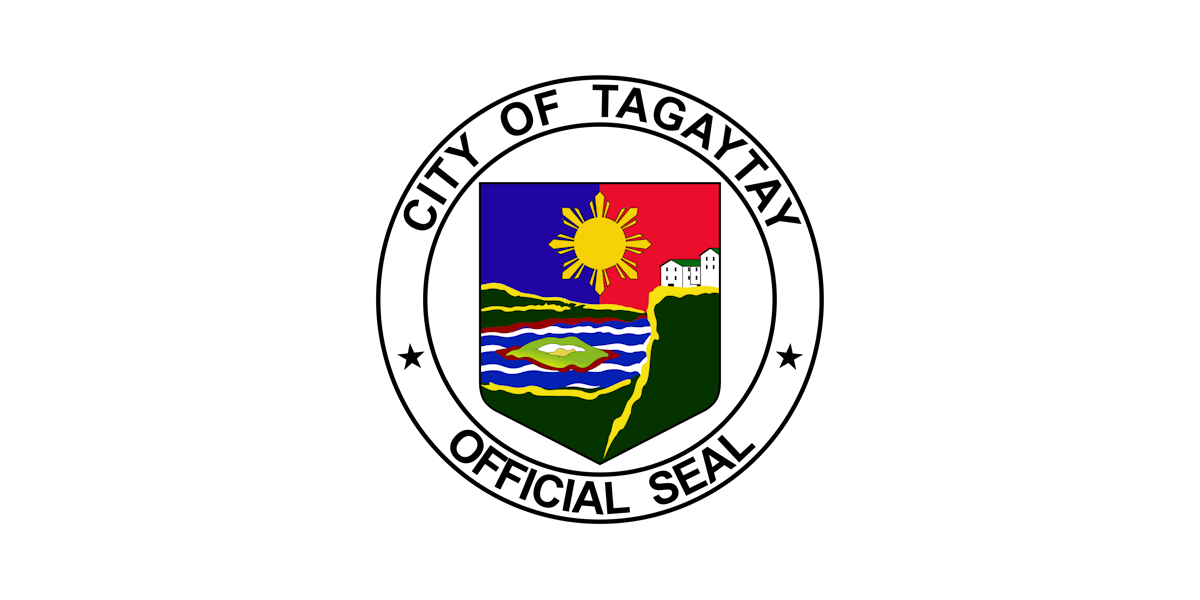
- Flag Seal
- Nickname: Alternative Summer Capital of the Philippines
- Map of Cavite with Tagaytay highlighted
- Interactive map of Tagaytay
- Location within the Philippines
- Coordinates: 14°06′N 120°56′E
- Country: Philippines
- Region: Calabarzon
- Province: Cavite
- District: 8th district
- Foundation and cityhood: June 21, 1938
- Barangays: 34 (see Barangays)

Government
  - Type: Sangguniang Panlungsod
  - Mayor: Aizack Brent D. Tolentino
  - Vice Mayor: Agnes D. Tolentino
  - Representative: Aniela Bianca D. Tolentino
  - City Council: Members: Michael Francis C. Tolentino; Joel B. Tibayan; Yolanda A. Marasigan; Jojit S. Desingaño; Marcelo A. Austria; Reynoso M. Espiritu; Lorna S. Toledo; Bianca Camille U. Pello; Gener M. Vergara; Annabelle M. Solis
  - Electorate: 54,743 voters (2025)

Area
  - Total: 65.00 km^{2} (25.10 sq mi)
- Elevation: 634 m (2,080 ft)
- Highest elevation: 740 m (2,430 ft)
- Lowest elevation: 292 m (958 ft)

Population (2024 census)
  - Total: 87,811
  - Density: 1,351/km^{2} (3,499/sq mi)
  - Households: 22,399
- Demonym: Tagaytayeño

Economy
  - Income class: 1st city income class
  - Poverty incidence: 9.61% (2023)
  - Revenue: ₱ 1,883 million (2024)
  - Assets: ₱ 10,025 million (2024)
  - Expenditure: ₱ 695.1 million (2024)
  - Liabilities: ₱ 3,354 million (2024)

Service provider
  - Electricity: Manila Electric Company (Meralco)
- Time zone: UTC+8 (PST)
- ZIP code: 4120
- PSGC: 042119000
- IDD : area code: +63 (0)46
- Native languages: Tagalog
- Numbered highways: N402 (Mendez–Tagaytay Road); N410 (Aguinaldo Highway, Tagaytay–Nasugbu Road); N420 (Tagaytay–Santa Rosa Road); N421 (Tagaytay–Calamba Road, Ligaya Drive)
- Major religions: Roman Catholicism; Protestantism; Eastern Orthodoxy
- Feast date: February 11
- Ecclesiastical diocese: Diocese of Imus (Roman Catholic); Diocese of Cavite (Iglesia Filipina Independiente); Diocese of Central Philippines (Episcopal Church in the Philippines); Diocese of the Philippines and Vietnam (Eastern Orthodoxy)
- Patron saint: Our Lady of Lourdes
- Website: www.tagaytay.gov.ph

Tagaytay ([tɐgaɪˈtaɪ]), officially the City of Tagaytay (Filipino: Lungsod ng Tagaytay), is a component city in the province of Cavite, Philippines. According to the 2024 census, it has a population of 87,811 people.

It is one of the country's most popular destinations for domestic tourism because of its scenery and cooler climate provided by its elevation. Tagaytay overlooks Taal Lake in Batangas and provides views of Taal Volcano Island in the middle of the lake through various vantage points situated in the city.

== Etymology ==
The name Tagaytay is derived from the Tagalog words tagaytay or taytay, which mean "mountain ridge" or "low mountain range", in reference to the Tagaytay Ridge on which the city sits.

== History ==
=== Spanish era ===
During the Spanish era the mountain forests of Tagaytay were a source of lumber for the Manila Galleons, traveling between Manila-Philippines and Acapulco-Mexico, these ships were built in the Cavite Shipyards in nearby Cavite City, of which, Tagaytay was a part of, being under Cavite province. Many Mexican soldiers who had arrived in the port of Cavite, that were dismissed from service by the Spanish crown spread across Cavite and also dispersed into Tagaytay wherein they became rebels or bandits, but also the spreading the Caviteño Chavacano Spanish-Creole language. The successful War of Independence against Spain by Mexico, immediately caused suspicion by the Spanish against the Mexicans who dispersed across Cavite and Tagaytay and other islands, since because of this, Cavite was the future center of the Philippine Revolution against Spain. Even though there were a large contingent of Mexicans telling Filipinos to rebel. Cavite and Tagaytay also had a large population of Spanish-Filipinos who immigrated from Spain, who were, 859 Spanish-Filipino families vs 5,724 native Filipino families, the Spanish forming a large minority that's 13% of the population, according to a 1700s census by Rev. Fr. Joaquín Martínez de Zúñiga OSA. In the 1818 Spanish-Census when Tagaytay city was under the district of Silang, they had 2,235 native families and 6 Spanish-Filipino families.

=== Philippine Revolution ===
During the Philippine Revolution of 1896, the ridges and forests of Tagaytay became a sanctuary for revolutionaries including those from nearby provinces. The passage to and from towns via Tagaytay added the word "mananagaytay" to the native's vocabulary. It means "to traverse ridges."

=== Cityhood ===
Tagaytay became a chartered city with the passing and signing of Commonwealth Act No. 338 by President Manuel L. Quezon on June 21, 1938, as authored by Representative Justiniano Montano of Cavite. To form the newly founded city, areas of the towns of Silang, Mendez, Indang, and Amadeo were removed from their town governments, making it the first planned community in the province and the first city to be built from scratch, given the ongoing highway works in the area then.

=== Territorial changes ===
On April 1, 1941, portions of Talisay, Batangas and Alfonso, Cavite were ceded to Tagaytay through Executive Order No. 336 signed by President Quezon to expand its territory. However, on June 7, 1956, the lakeside barangays of Birinayan (Berinayan) and Caloocan on the shores of Taal Lake were returned to Talisay. Berinayan later became part of Laurel when the municipality was established in 1969.

=== World War II ===
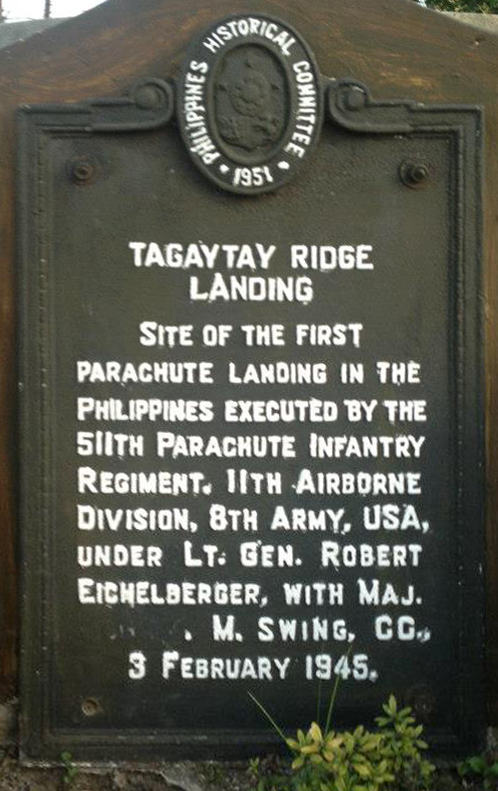
1951 Historical marker commemorating Tagaytay landing.

On February 3, 1945, the 11th Airborne Division of Lt. Gen. Robert L. Eichelberger's 8th Army performed a combat jump of the 511th Parachute Infantry Regiment and associated elements on Tagaytay ridge, with a drop zone around the Manila Hotel Annex, which had been cleared of Japanese forces by the Fil-American Cavite Guerilla Forces of General Mariano Castaneda, After the fall of Bataan and Corregidor, the Fil-American Cavite Guerilla Force resisted the Japanese occupation forces and were instrumental in clearing the landing zone of the 11th Airborne Division . To commemorate this event, a marker was installed in 1951 at the junction of Silang, Canlubang-Nasugbu roads by the city officials in coordination with the National Historical Institute of the Philippines.

== Geography ==
Tagaytay is relatively close to the capital city of Manila, only 59 kilometers (37 mi) away via Aguinaldo Highway, providing an easy escape for the locals from the heat of the huge metropolis. It is 39 kilometers (24 mi) from Imus.

=== Land area ===
Tagaytay has a total land area of 66.1 km^{2} (26 sq mi) which represents about 4.63% of the total area of the province of Cavite. It lies within 120°56' longitude and 14°6' latitude and overlooks Manila Bay to the north, Taal Volcano and Taal Lake to the south, and Laguna de Bay to the east.

=== Topography ===
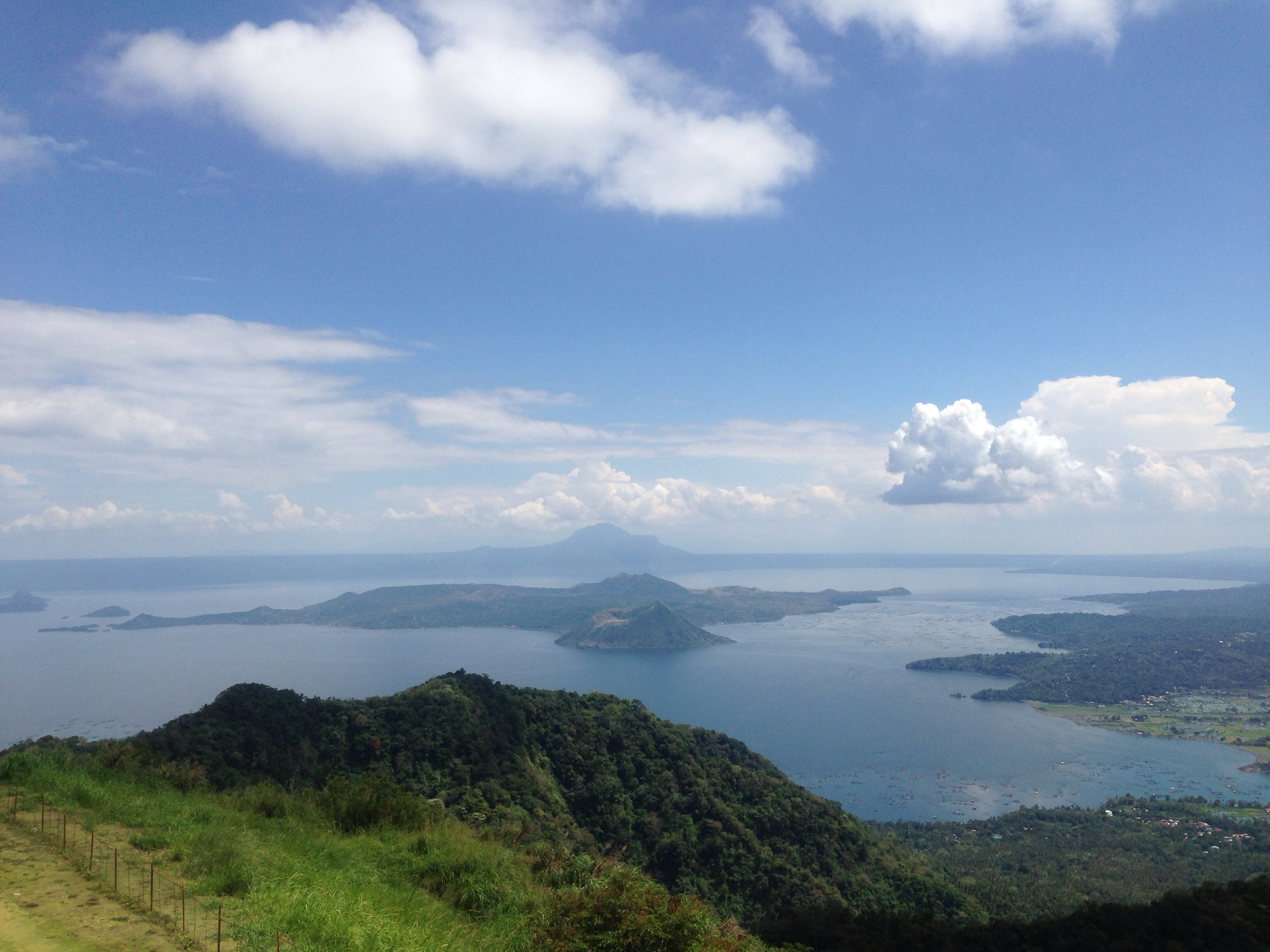
View of Taal Lake and Volcano from Tagaytay

The southern and eastern portions of Tagaytay are covered by hills and mountains which is generally forests, pine trees, and open grasslands. The city lies along Tagaytay Ridge, a ridge stretching about 32 kilometers (20 mi) from Mount Batulao in the west to Mount Sungay in the east with elevations averaging about 610 meters (2,000 ft) above sea level. Mount Sungay in Tagaytay is the highest point of the province of Cavite at 709 meters (2,326 ft).

The ridge, which overlooks Taal Lake in Batangas province, is the edge of Taal Caldera. The 25-by-30-kilometer (16 mi × 19 mi) wide cavity is partially filled by Taal Lake. Tagaytay's built-up areas including the urban center are situated in the relatively level top of the caldera rim, but beyond the edge are deep ravines that drop steeply to Taal Lake. The portions adjoining the municipalities of Mendez, Indang, Amadeo, Silang, and Alfonso are level to nearly level areas interspersed with very gently sloping surfaces. Across the southern edge of the lake on the opposite side of the city is Mount Macolod, the highest point of the Taal Caldera rim.

=== Climate ===
Temperature and precipitation

Tagaytay has a mild tropical monsoon climate (Köppen climate classification: Am) characterized by cooler weather compared to Manila, lower humidity and abundant rainfall. The city has an average temperature of 22 °C (72 °F) and rarely exceeds 31 °C (88 °F).

With its high elevation, the city gets foggy, windy, and cooler temperatures during the months of December, January, and February. Like most areas in the province of Cavite, the city has two pronounced seasons: dry from November to April and wet during the rest of the year.

Humidity and wind

Tagaytay has an average relative humidity of about 78%. Northeasterly winds prevail in the city from October to April. Winds come from southwest from May to September. The cool Tagaytay breeze has made the city popular for casual and competitive kite flying.

Climate data for Tagaytay
Month	Jan	Feb	Mar	Apr	May	Jun	Jul	Aug	Sep	Oct	Nov	Dec	Year
Mean maximum °C (°F)	27.0 (80.6)	28.0 (82.4)	30.0 (86.0)	31.0 (87.8)	30.0 (86.0)	29.0 (84.2)	28.0 (82.4)	27.0 (80.6)	27.0 (80.6)	27.0 (80.6)	27.0 (80.6)	27.0 (80.6)	28.2 (82.8)
Mean daily maximum °C (°F)	24.0 (75.2)	26.0 (78.8)	27.0 (80.6)	29.0 (84.2)	28.0 (82.4)	26.0 (78.8)	25.0 (77.0)	24.0 (75.2)	25.0 (77.0)	25.0 (77.0)	25.0 (77.0)	24.0 (75.2)	25.7 (78.3)
Daily mean °C (°F)	20.0 (68.0)	21.0 (69.8)	21.5 (70.7)	23.5 (74.3)	24.0 (75.2)	23.0 (73.4)	22.5 (72.5)	22.0 (71.6)	22.5 (72.5)	22.0 (71.6)	21.5 (70.7)	20.5 (68.9)	22.0 (71.6)
Mean daily minimum °C (°F)	16.0 (60.8)	16.0 (60.8)	16.0 (60.8)	18.0 (64.4)	20.0 (68.0)	20.0 (68.0)	20.0 (68.0)	20.0 (68.0)	20.0 (68.0)	19.0 (66.2)	18.0 (64.4)	17.0 (62.6)	18.3 (65.0)
Mean minimum °C (°F)	13.0 (55.4)	13.0 (55.4)	14.0 (57.2)	16.0 (60.8)	18.0 (64.4)	18.0 (64.4)	18.0 (64.4)	19.0 (66.2)	18.0 (64.4)	16.0 (60.8)	15.0 (59.0)	14.0 (57.2)	16.0 (60.8)
Average precipitation mm (inches)	11 (0.4)	13 (0.5)	14 (0.6)	32 (1.3)	101 (4.0)	142 (5.6)	208 (8.2)	187 (7.4)	175 (6.9)	131 (5.2)	68 (2.7)	39 (1.5)	1,121 (44.3)
Source: meteoblue.com (modeled/calculated data, not measured locally)

=== Barangays ===
Tagaytay is administratively subdivided into 34 barangays, as indicated below. Each barangay consists of puroks and some have sitios.

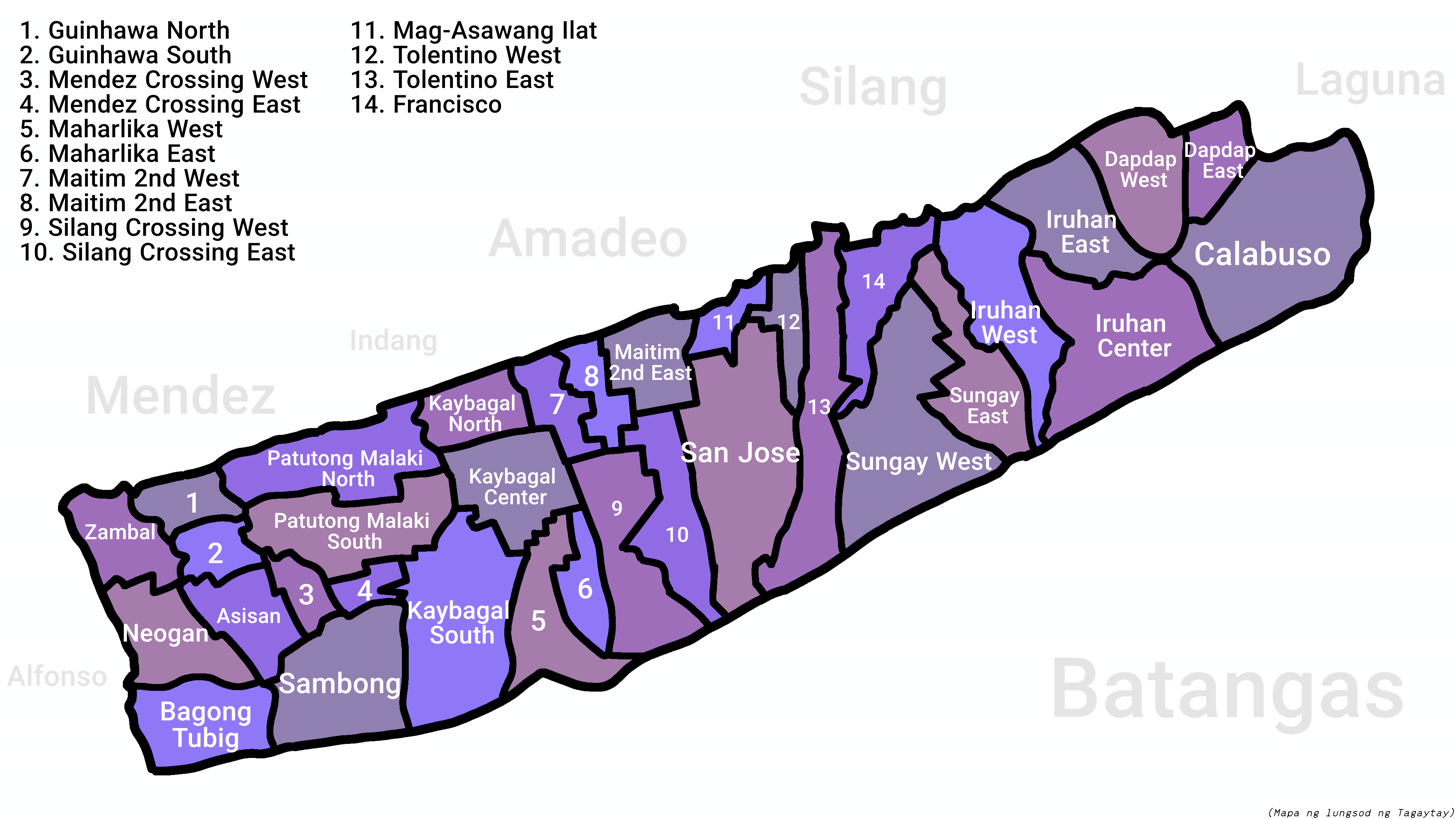
Barangay map of Tagaytay

- Asisan
- Bagong Tubig
- Calabuso
- Dapdap East
- Dapdap West
- Francisco
- Guinhawa North
- Guinhawa South
- Iruhin East
- Iruhin South
- Iruhin West
- Kaybagal Central
- Kaybagal North
- Kaybagal South (Poblacion)
- Mag-Asawang Ilat
- Maharlika East
- Maharlika West
- Maitim 2nd Central
- Maitim 2nd East
- Maitim 2nd West
- Mendez Crossing East
- Mendez Crossing West
- Neogan
- Patutong Malaki North
- Patutong Malaki South
- Sambong
- San Jose
- Silang Junction North
- Silang Junction South
- Sungay East
- Sungay West
- Tolentino East
- Tolentino West
- Zambal

== Demographics ==
Population census of Tagaytay

Year	Pop.	±% p.a.
1939	1,657	—
1948	5,233	+13.63%
1960	7,203	+2.70%
1970	10,907	+4.23%
1975	13,388	+4.20%
1980	16,322	+4.04%
1990	23,739	+3.82%

Year	Pop.	±% p.a.
1995	29,419	+4.10%
2000	45,287	+9.69%
2007	61,623	+4.34%
2010	62,030	+0.24%
2015	71,181	+2.66%
2020	85,330	+3.89%
2024	87,811	+0.69%

Source: Philippine Statistics Authority

In the 2024 census, the population of Tagaytay was 87,811 people, with a density of 1,400 inhabitants per square kilometre or 3,600 inhabitants per square mile.

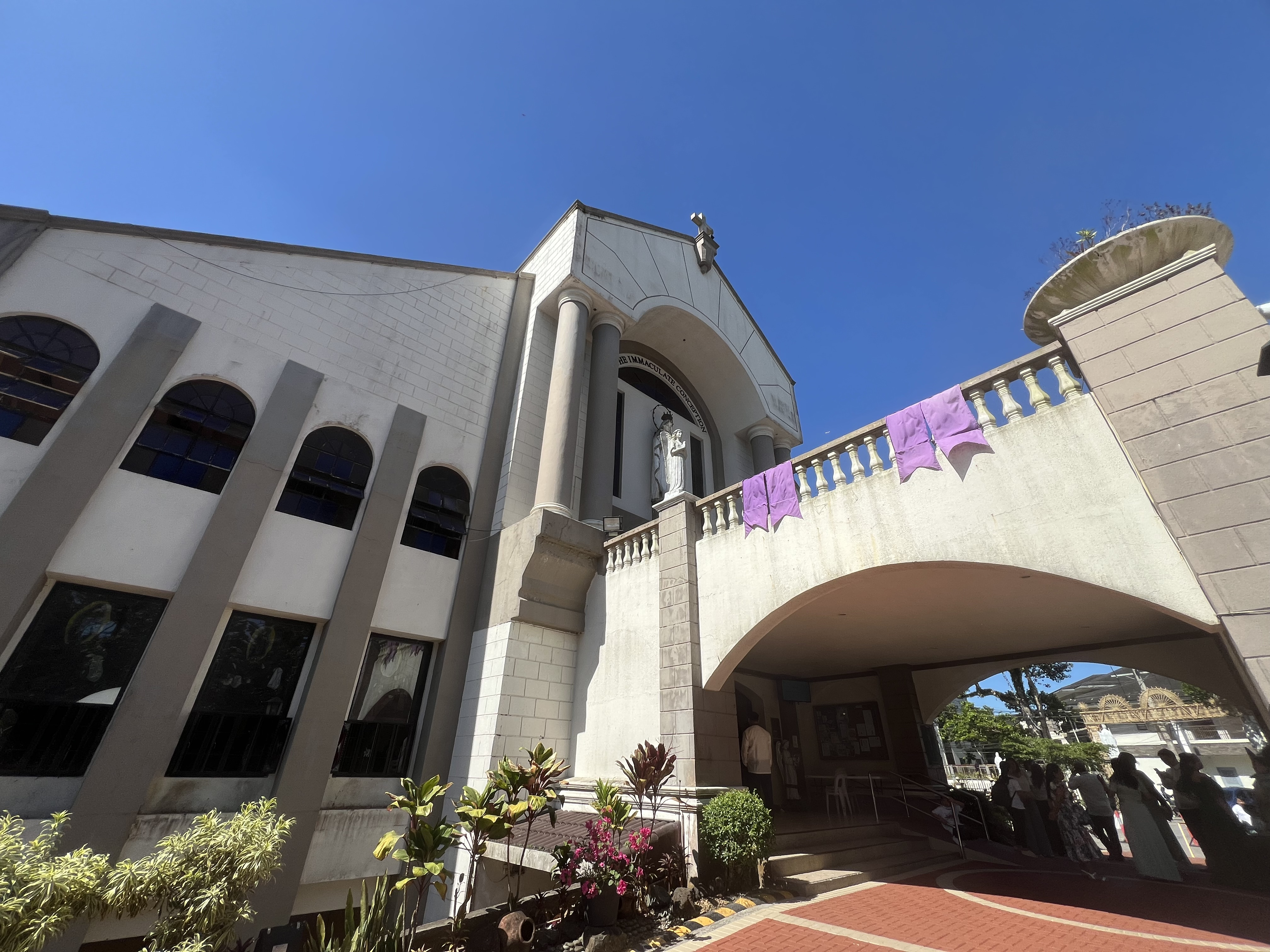
Our Lady of Lourdes Parish Church

In the 2010 census, Tagaytay had a population of 62,030 people. Christianity is the majority religion of Tagaytayeños with Roman Catholicism as the most dominant sect, compromising 95.36 percent of the total population. The next prominent Christian denominations among residents of Tagaytay are Protestants which comprise 3.37% of the population including Iglesia ni Cristo (2.5%). The Eastern Orthodox Church was a part of the Philippine Orthodox Church in the Philippines under the jurisdiction of the Patriarchate of Moscow and its own Orthodox Diocese province in Southeast Asia, the Diocese of the Philippines and Vietnam, and the Orthodox community account for 1% of Tagaytay's population, many of whom live throughout the town. The rest of the population (0.20%) subscribes to other religions, like the Episcopal Church in the Philippines, present in the city with the establishment of St. Barnabas Episcopal Church in Brgy. Mendez Crossing West.

Tagalog is the dominant language in the city, with 93.58% of the population speaking the language. The next prominent Philippine languages are Bicolano (1.52%), Ilocano (1.52%), and Cebuano (1.00%).

== Economy ==
Poverty incidence of Tagaytay (%)

Source: Philippine Statistics Authority

=== Agriculture ===
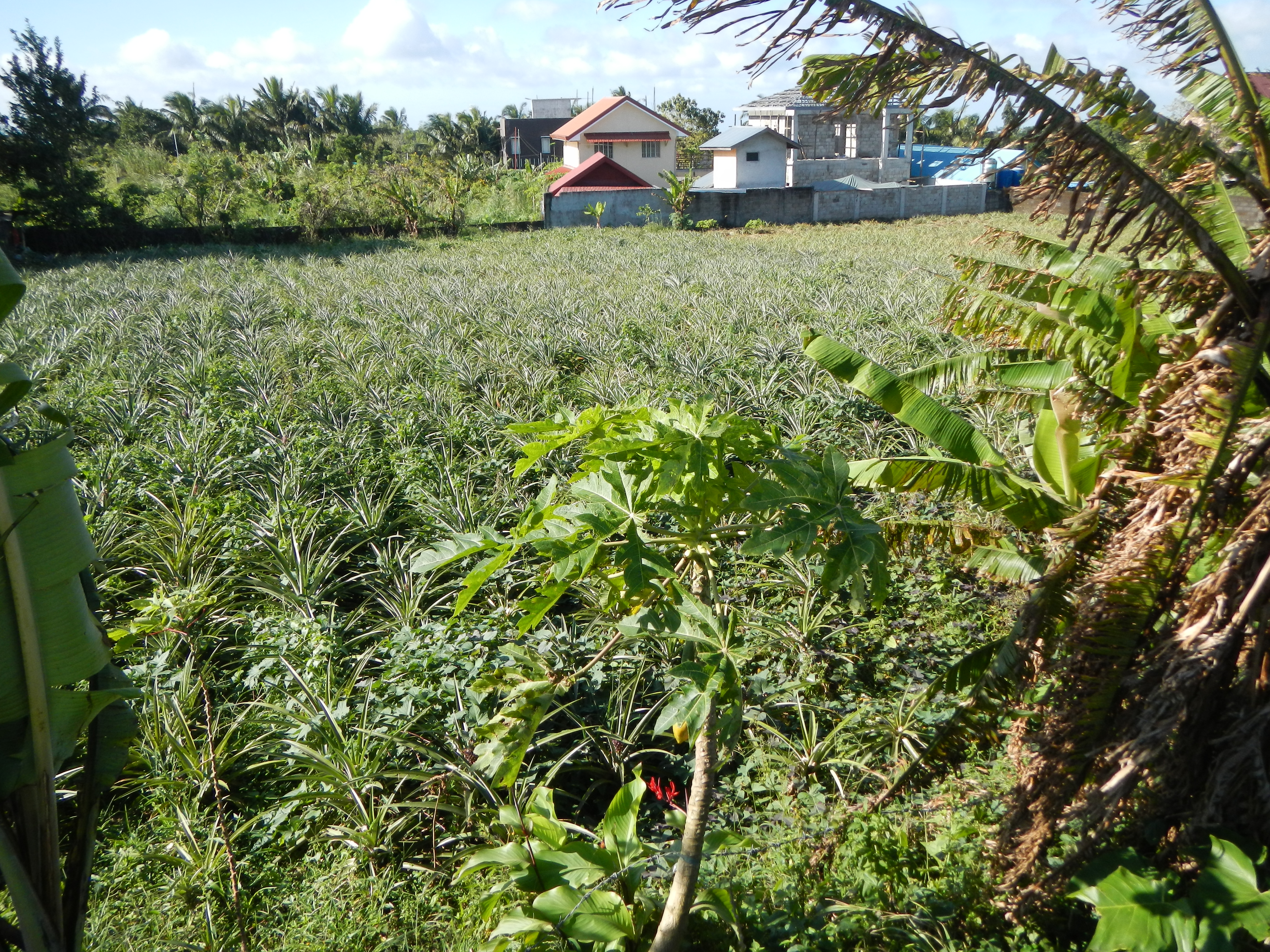
Pineapple field in Tagaytay with a papaya tree and banana plants in the foreground.

Despite rapid urbanization of Tagaytay, agriculture remains an important part of the city's economy and development. As of 2009, it is recorded that there are about 1,292 hectares (3,190 acres) of agriculture land which is about 20 percent of the city's total land area. The city was once cogon grassland as a result of Taal eruptions. The soil contains rich volcanic components suitable to farming. The main agricultural goods produced are pineapple, coffee, banana, root crops, cacao, camote, cassava, other fruits and vegetables, and cut flowers which are supplied to both local and international markets. Garden plant shops thrive along Tagaytay–Calamba Road. The city was once a daisy and gladiola farming haven prior to tourism development and a residential boom.

=== Tourism ===
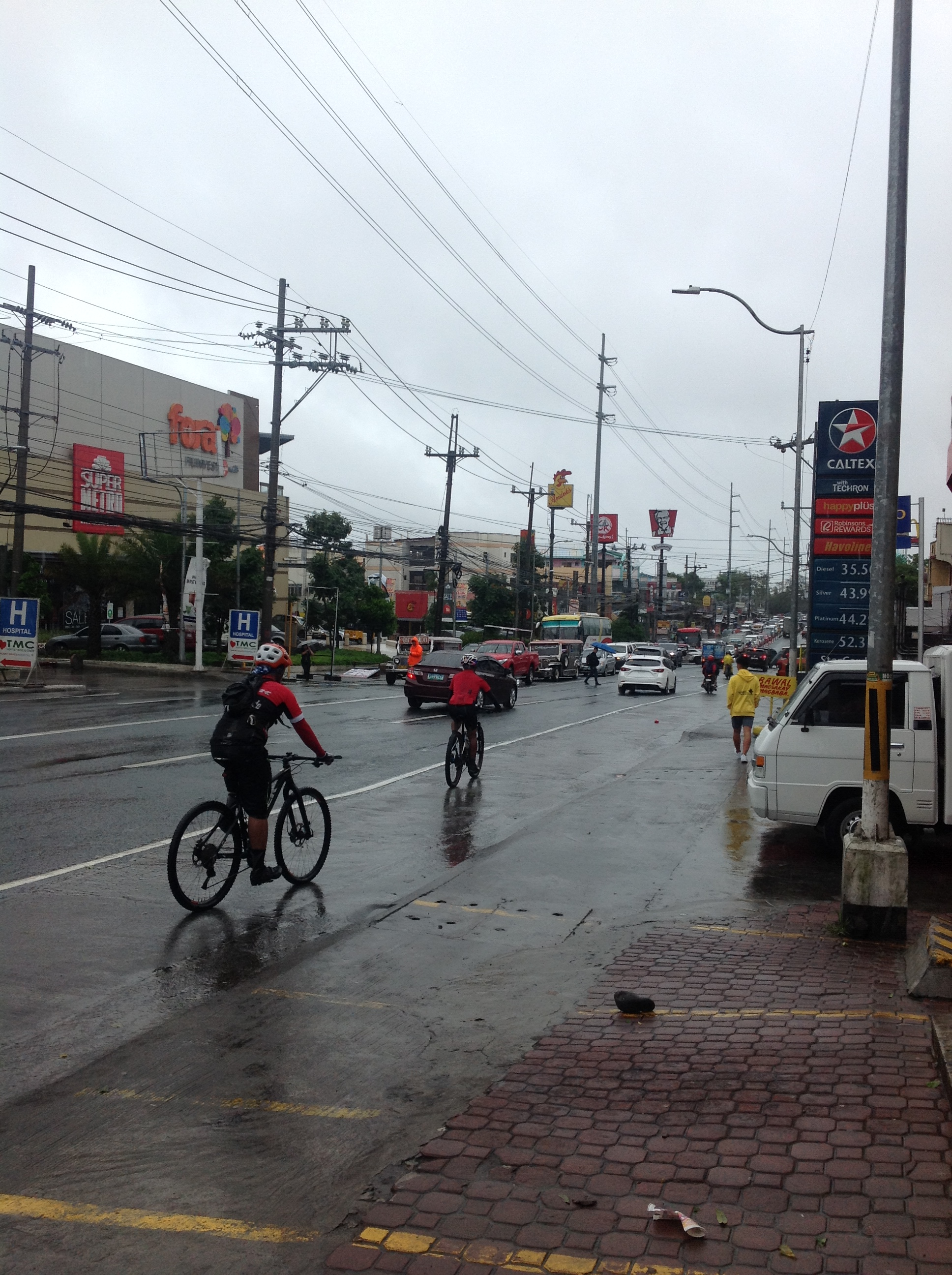
Aguinaldo Highway or Tagaytay City - Silang Junction

Tagaytay is considered to be the second summer capital of the Philippines with the first being Baguio due to its cool climate and, thus, is a favored destination for those seeking more temperate areas of the Philippines. Tagaytay is also a destination for tourists seeking views of Taal Volcano and the surrounding lake. In 2015, the Department of Tourism cited Tagaytay as the top tourist destination in the Calabarzon region. Among the most visited sites in Tagaytay are Sky Ranch, Ayala Malls Serin, Robinsons Summit Ridge (Robinsons Tagaytay), Picnic Grove Complex, People's Park in the Sky, Halfway Zoo, and numerous restaurants known for serving the famous bulalo and crispy tawilis. Fresh beef and vegetables are sold at Mahogany Market. Tagaytay City Market contains many fruit and vegetable stands as well as fresh tilapia from Taal Lake. Tagaytay's proximity to Metro Manila accounts for the high level of tourism in the city. Tagaytay receives a seasonal influx of tourists during Christmas season and Holy Week, and the city is a pilgrimage destination with many churches, shrines, and retreat houses. The Taal Vista Hotel is a symbol of Tagaytay's past.

== Government ==
The Tagaytay City Hall since June 2025

The current city hall of Tagaytay was opened on June 21, 2025. It also features a stainless steel 3.66-meter (12.0 ft) statue of Jose Rizal as a fencer.

== Transportation ==
=== Roads ===
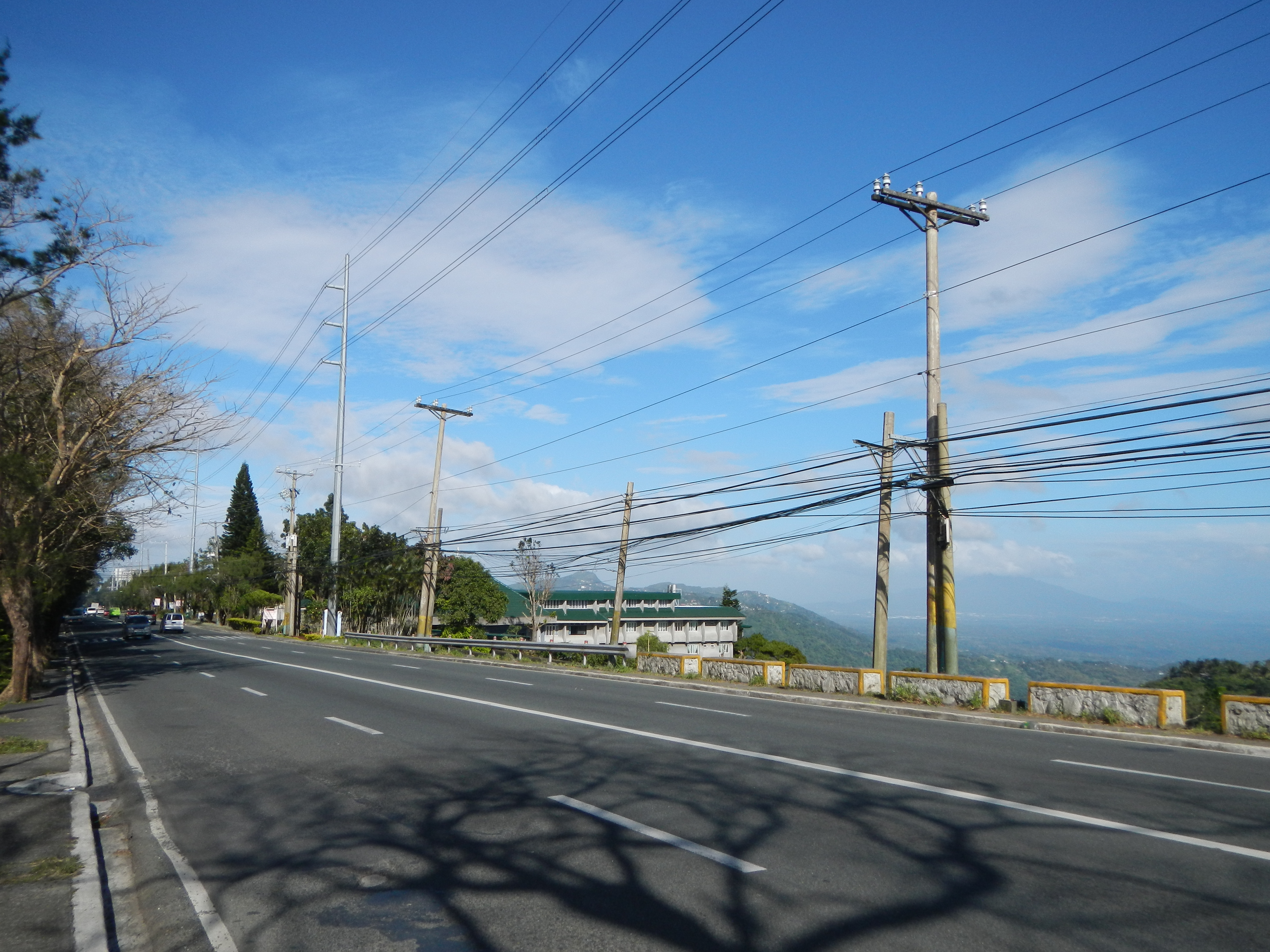
Tagaytay–Nasugbu Highway

Tagaytay is linked by national highways to the Metro Manila area and to the provinces of Batangas and Laguna. Secondary roads link the city with the adjoining municipalities of Amadeo, Mendez, Indang, Silang, and Alfonso in Cavite towards the northwest, to the cities of Calamba, Cabuyao, and Santa Rosa in Laguna to the northeast, and the town of Talisay in Batangas to the south.

The South Luzon Expressway serves the city via Tagaytay–Santa Rosa Road that passes Santa Rosa and Silang from Santa Rosa and Eton City Exits, and Tagaytay-Calamba Road that traverses Calamba Premiere International Park from Batino Exit, albeit discontinuously for the public previously due to the Tagaytay Highlands right of way. Governor's Drive and Pala-Pala Road in Dasmariñas from Carmona Exit, and Cavite–Laguna Expressway (CALAX) through its Silang–Aguinaldo Exit in Silang are the other alternative routes to the city, as those roads intersect with the Aguinaldo Highway, which ends in Tagaytay. The Manila-Cavite Expressway (CAVITEx, formerly Coastal Road) also serves Tagaytay via Aguinaldo Highway.

From Batangas, the main route to Tagaytay is either Tagaytay–Nasugbu Highway, a major thoroughfare from Tagaytay Rotonda to Nasugbu, Ligaya Drive, a winding road that starts near the poblacion of Talisay and ends near Tagaytay Picnic Grove, or Tagaytay–Talisay Road, a 12-kilometer (7.5 mi) road from Lemery–Agoncillo–Laurel–Talisay Road to Tagaytay Rotunda. From Laguna, the main route is Tagaytay–Santa Rosa Road from Santa Rosa, Laguna; another route is Tagaytay–Calamba Road (via Tagaytay Highlands and a future link to Calamba) from Calamba, Laguna. Mahogany Avenue also serves as the alternative route of the Tagaytay–Nasugbu Highway within Tagaytay city proper.

To decongest traffic on the aforementioned major roads in Tagaytay, the partially opened Tagaytay Bypass Road and the proposed Cavite–Tagaytay–Batangas Expressway (CTBEX) were laid out to traverse parallel to the Tagaytay–Nasugbu Highway. CTBEX will connect with the CALAX in Silang to Nasugbu, Batangas.

== Notable personalities ==
- Francis Tolentino – Senator (2019–2025), mayor of Tagaytay (1995–2004)

== Sister cities ==
Local

- Legazpi
- Baguio
- Bacolod
- Murcia, Negros Occidental
- Iriga
- Iloilo City
- Cebu City
- Palayan
- San Nicolas, Batangas

International

- Manningham, Victoria, Australia
- (United States) Las Vegas, Nevada
- (United States) Rohnert Park, California
- Tainan, Taiwan

== See also ==
- Tagaytay Hospital and Medical Center
