= Lemery, Batangas =

Municipality in Batangas, Philippines

Lemery
- Municipality
- Municipality of Lemery
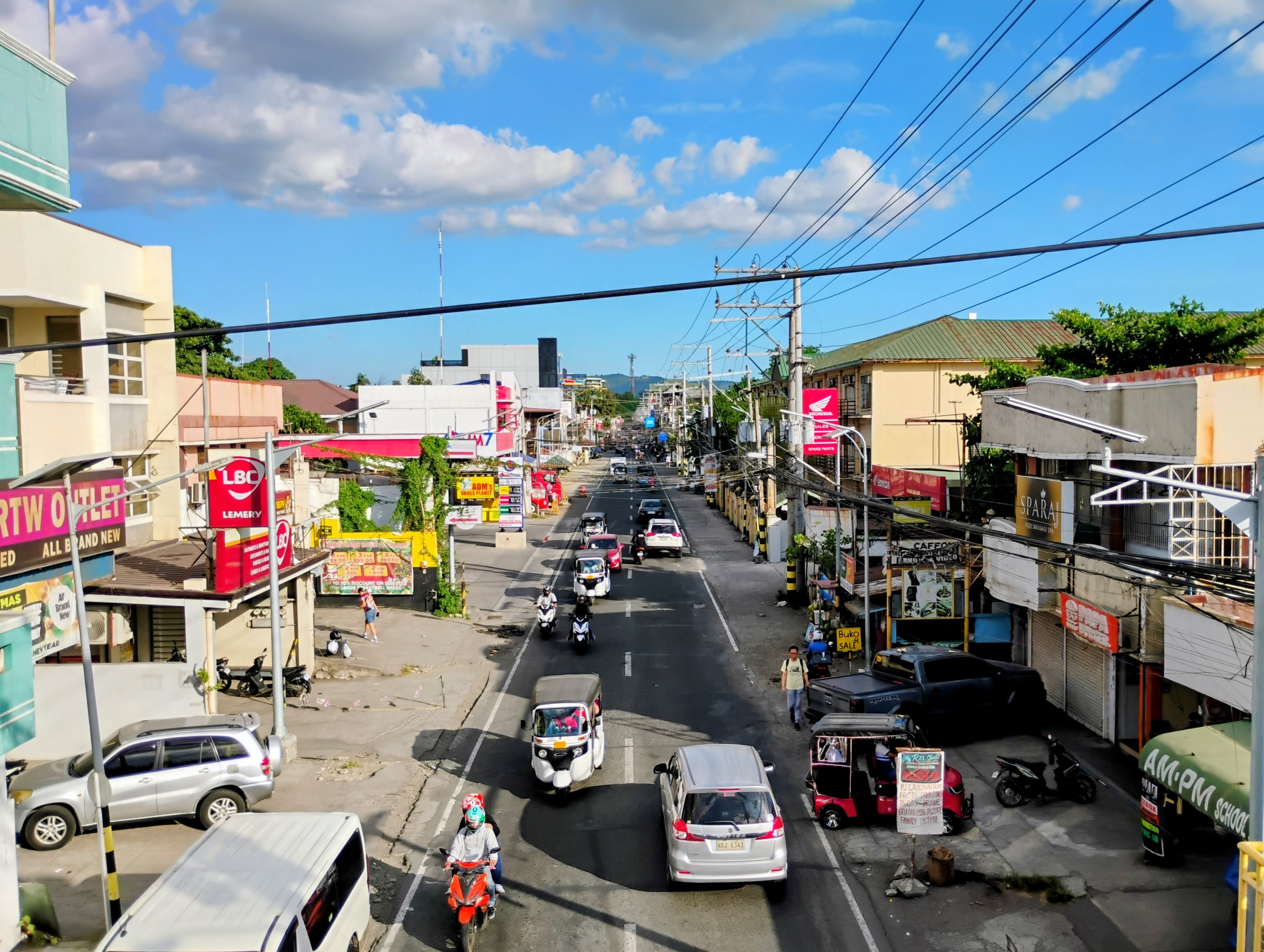
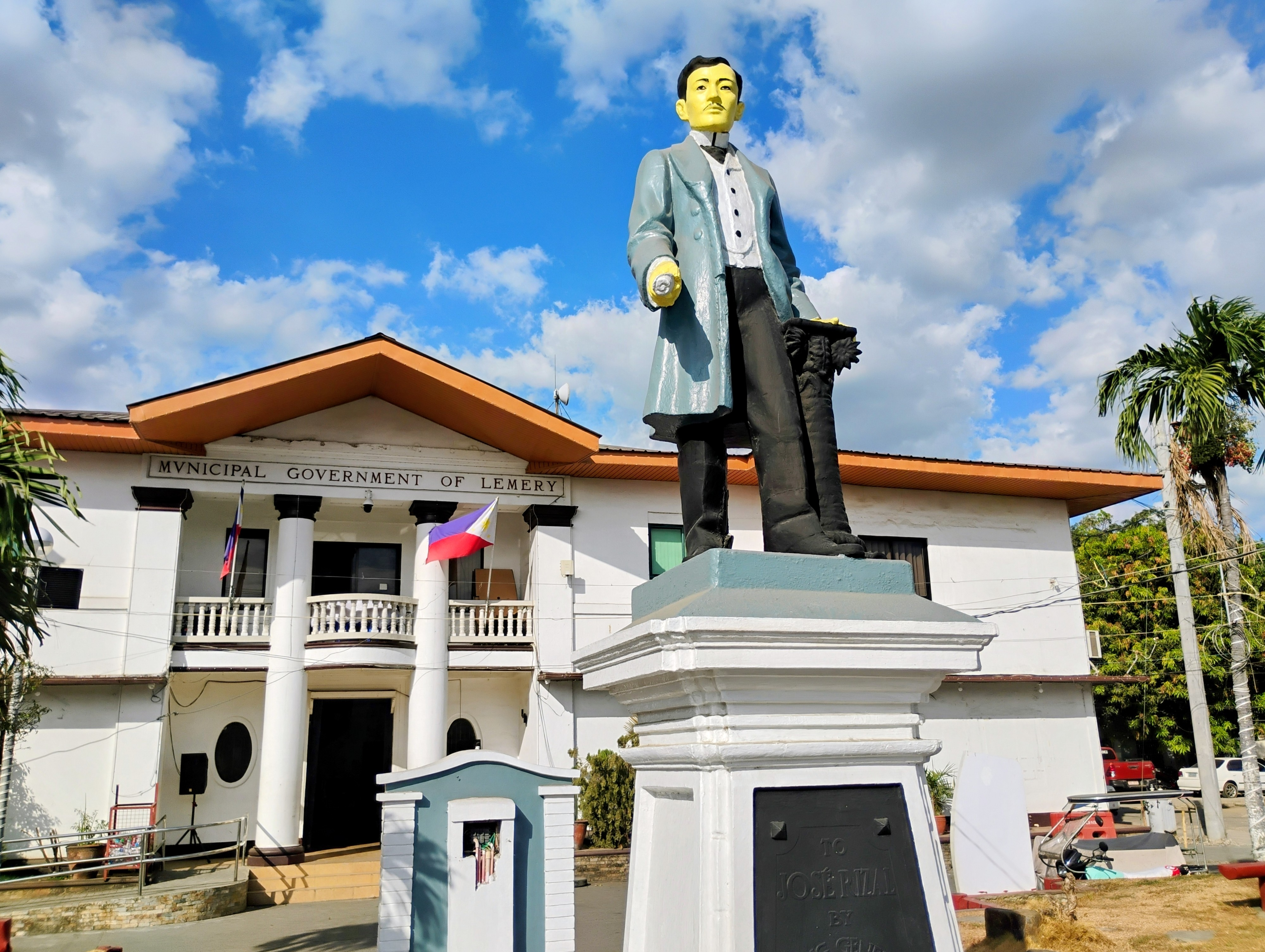
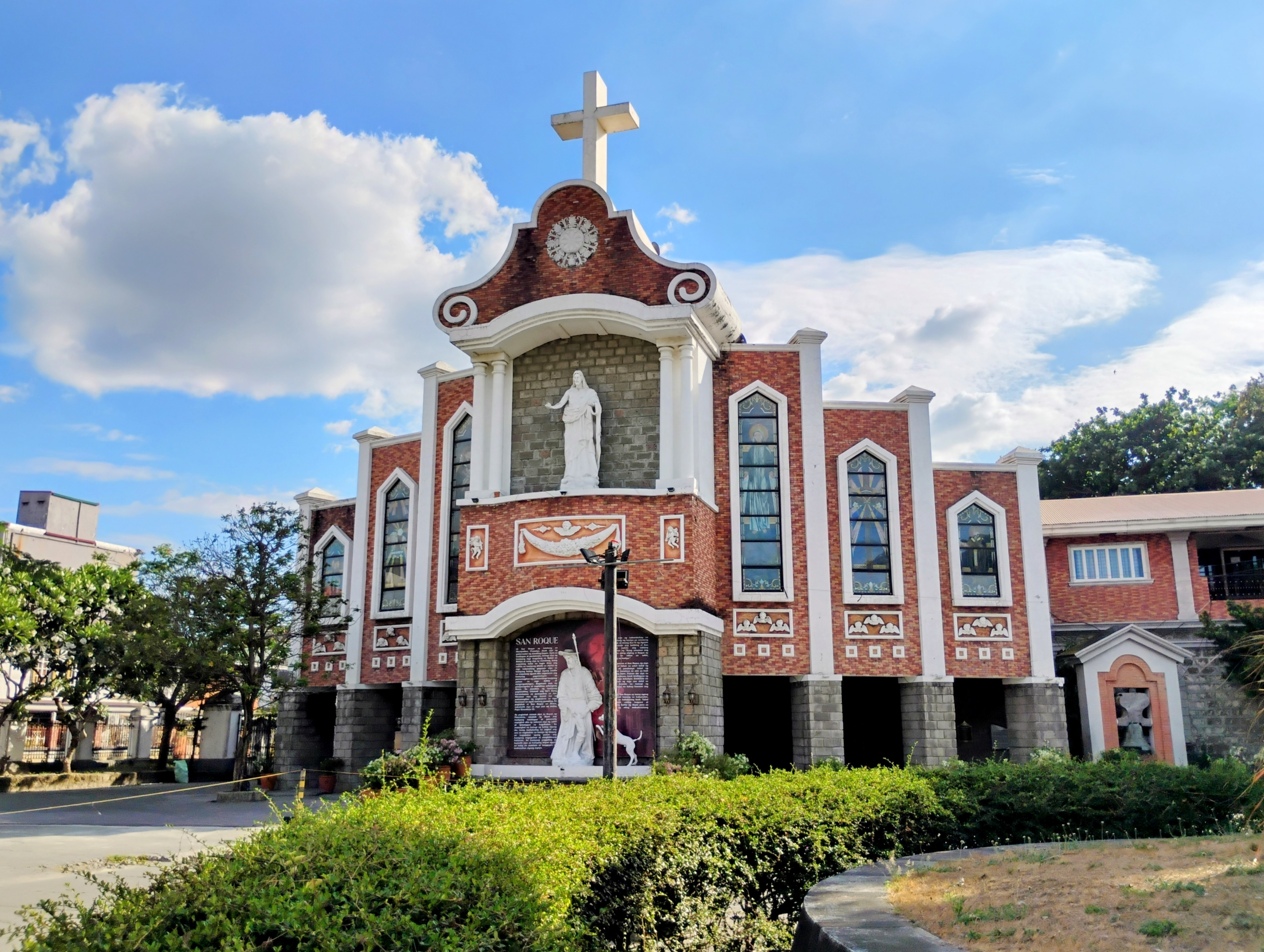
- Lemery Town Proper Lemery Municipal Hall San Roque Parish Church

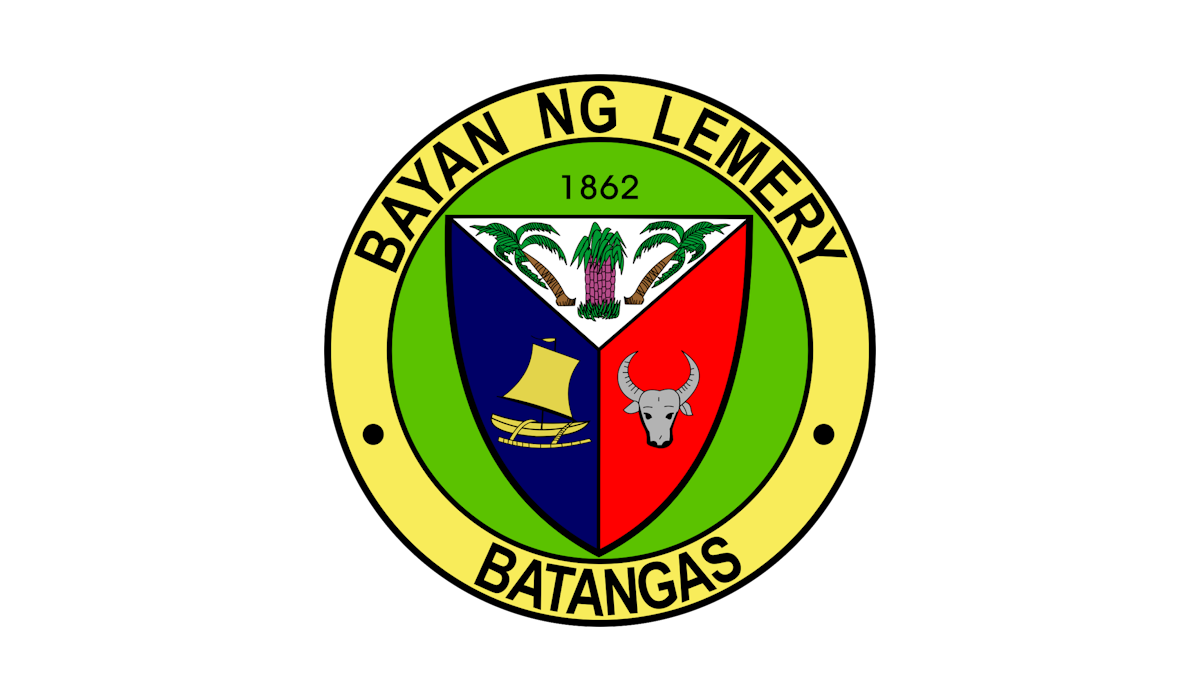
- Flag Seal

- Map of Batangas with Lemery highlighted
- Interactive map of Lemery
- Location within the Philippines
- Coordinates: 13°52′52″N 120°54′46″E
- Country: Philippines
- Region: Calabarzon
- Province: Batangas
- District: 1st district
- Founded: May 26, 1862
- Annexation to Taal: March 28, 1903
- Chartered: October 25, 1906
- Named for: Roberto Lemery
- Barangays: 46 (see Barangays)

Government
  - Type: Sangguniang Bayan
  - Mayor: Ian Kenneth M. Alilio
  - Vice Mayor: Hannah Beatriz C. Cabral
  - Representative: Leandro Antonio L. Leviste
  - Municipal Council: Members: Jayvee C. Bendaña; Jude V. Suayan; Bienvenido C. Villanueva; Ivanna Pauline G. Malabanan; Benedict M. Miranda; Christopher Jones M. Bello; Rosendo R. Eguia; Christopher P. Alilio
  - Electorate: 59,437 voters (2025)

Area
  - Total: 109.80 km^{2} (42.39 sq mi)
- Elevation: 123 m (404 ft)
- Highest elevation: 779 m (2,556 ft)
- Lowest elevation: 0 m (0 ft)

Population (2024 census)
  - Total: 94,736
  - Density: 862.81/km^{2} (2,234.7/sq mi)
  - Households: 21,122

Economy
  - Income class: 1st municipal income class
  - Poverty incidence: 9.22% (2023)
  - Revenue: ₱ 493.8 million (2024)
  - Assets: ₱ 1,609 million (2024)
  - Expenditure: ₱ 277.3 million (2024)
  - Liabilities: ₱ 351.5 million (2024)

Service provider
  - Electricity: Batangas 1 Electric Cooperative (BATELEC 1)
- Time zone: UTC+8 (PST)
- ZIP code: 4209
- PSGC: 0401012000
- IDD : area code: +63 (0)43
- Native languages: Tagalog
- Website: www.lemerybatangas.gov.ph

Lemery, officially the Municipality of Lemery (Tagalog: Bayan ng Lemery), is a municipality in the province of Batangas, Philippines. According to the 2024 census, it has a population of 94,736 people.

== Etymology ==
The municipality was named after Captain Roberto Lémery, commanding officer of the local garrison until his death in 1856.

== History ==
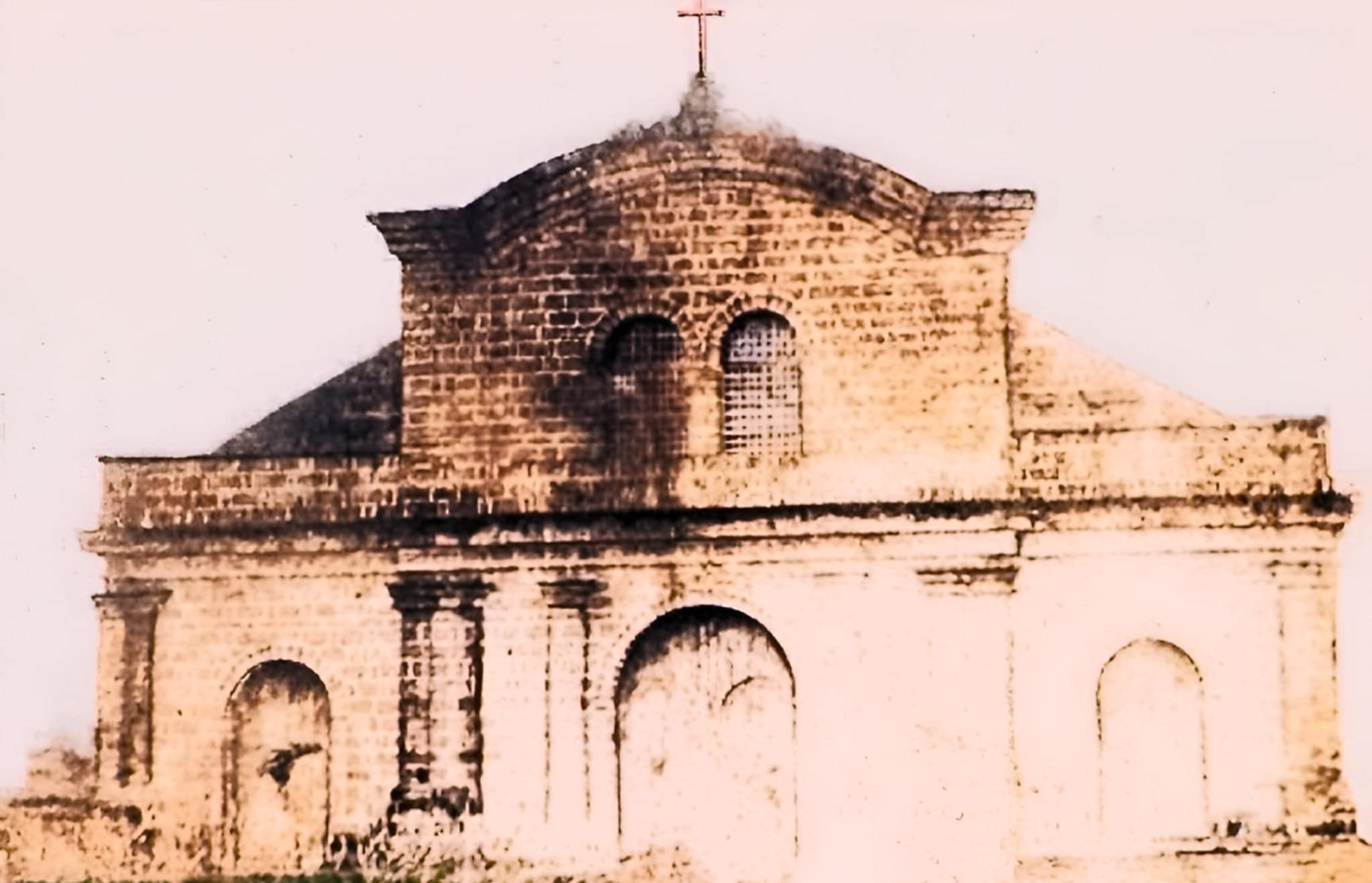
Old San Roque Parish

During the early part of the 18th century, settlers from Taal, northern Mindoro and southern Cavite were attracted to the vast plain near the shores of Balayan Bay because of its abundance in fish and other marine life. Salting and drying fish became their major occupation due to the great demand of salted and dried fish by the people of Cavite, Mindoro, Laguna and Batangas. People came in great numbers to join the settlers, and the village became populous. The place was first called Punta, meaning "point", and in 1818 was converted into a barrio of the Municipality of Taal. It was later renamed San Gerónimo.

In 1858, the barrio of San Gerónimo became

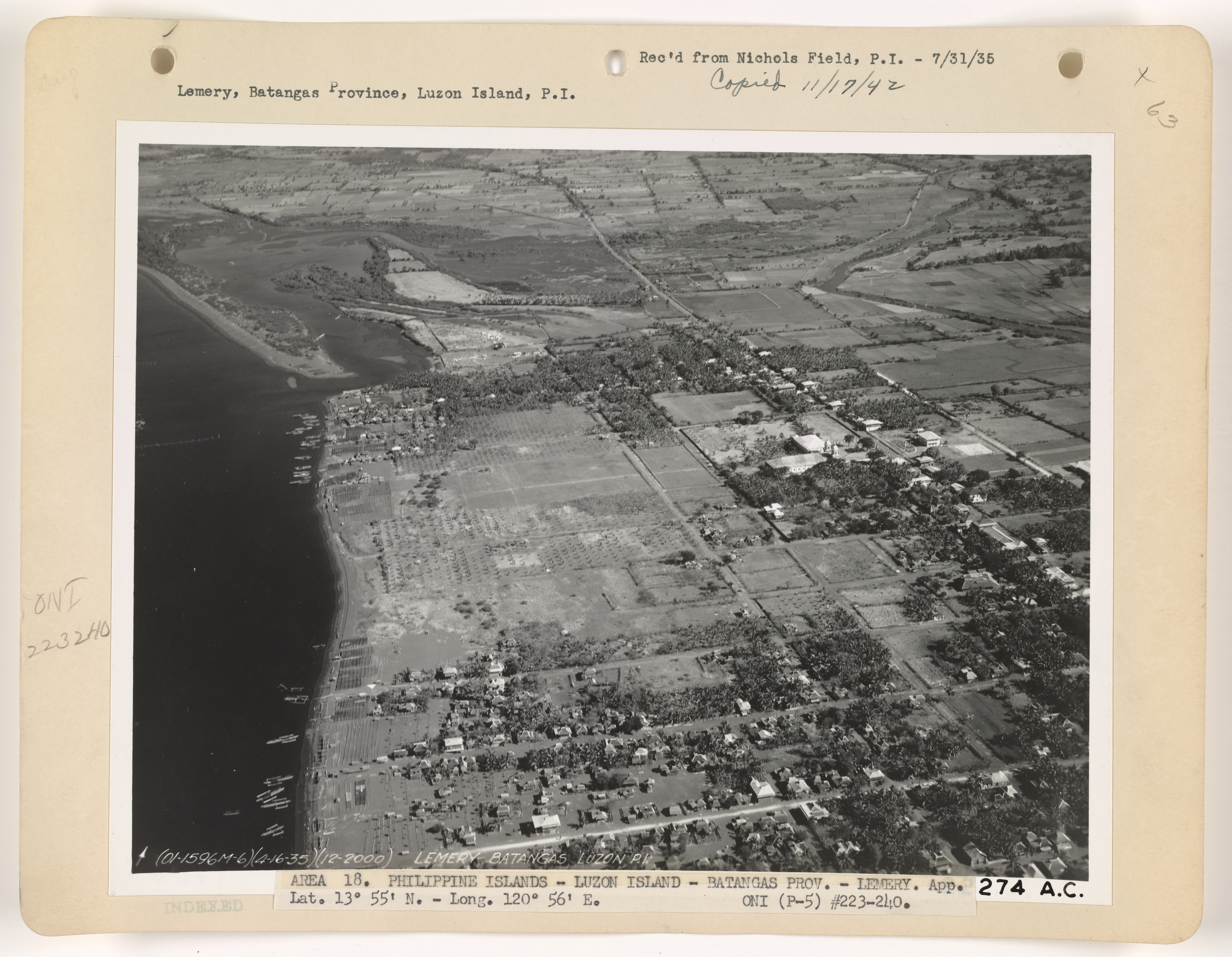
Aerial view of Lemery, circa 1930s

officially known as Lémery, after Captain Roberto Lémery, a commanding officer of the local military garrison. Lémery was known for his deep ties to the community, for although he was tasked with instructing military personnel assigned to the garrison, he went out of his way to immerse himself in the local way of life. He formed relationships with local Church officials, learnt Tagalog, and cultivated harmony among the populace. When he died in 1856, locals wished for the town to be renamed in his memory.

In 1862, Lemery and its surrounding barrios were separated from the Municipality of Taal. It became a district municipality through the efforts of Cándida Cesario Valenzuela, Manuel Cabrera, Policarpio Mariño and Domingo Agoncillo. José Cabrera became the First Gobernadorcillo of the newly created town.

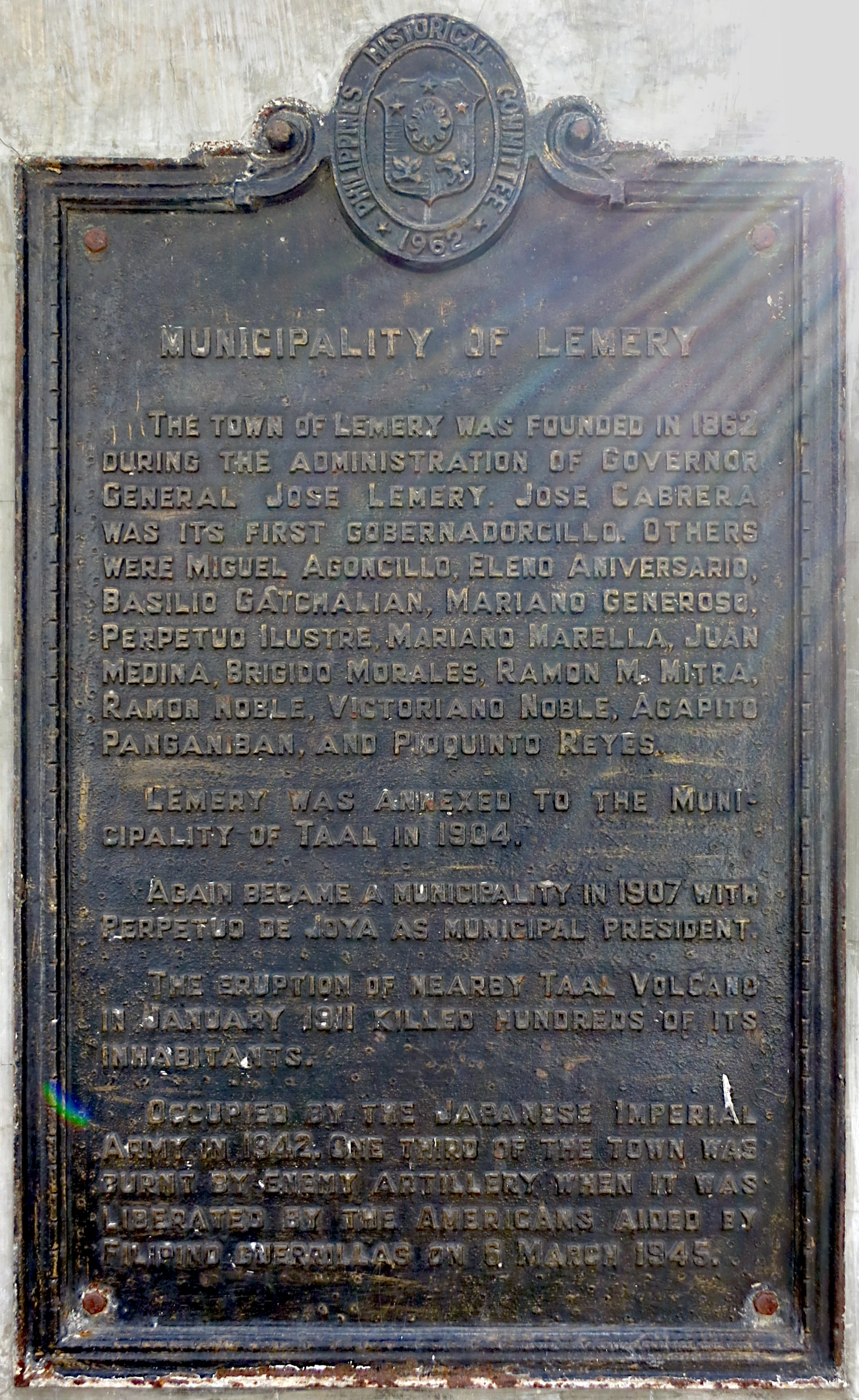
National historical marker installed in 1962 outside the municipal hall

The local military garrison was officially incorporated into the Guardia Civil upon the latter's creation in 1868. This newly formed organization was a gendarmerie tasked with law enforcement in the Philippines. It operated under the Spanish Army and Spanish colonial government and remained the de facto police force in the entire Philippines until its independence from Spain in 1898.

For economic considerations, Lemery was again annexed to Taal in 1903, alongside San Luis. Finally, by virtue of Act No. 1549 of the Philippine Commission, it was reinstated as an independent municipality on October 25, 1906. Through Presidential Proclamation 685, October 25, 2024 was declared a special non-working day to commemorate its founding anniversary as an independent municipality.

== Geography ==
According to the Philippine Statistics Authority, the municipality has a land area of 109.80 square kilometers (42.39 sq mi) constituting 3.52% of the 3,119.75-square-kilometer (1,204.54 sq mi) total area of Batangas.

Lemery is 25 kilometers (16 mi) from the provincial capital Batangas City, 130 kilometers (81 mi) from the nation's capital Manila, and 38 kilometers (24 mi) from Tagaytay, a well-known tourist destination.

=== Barangays ===
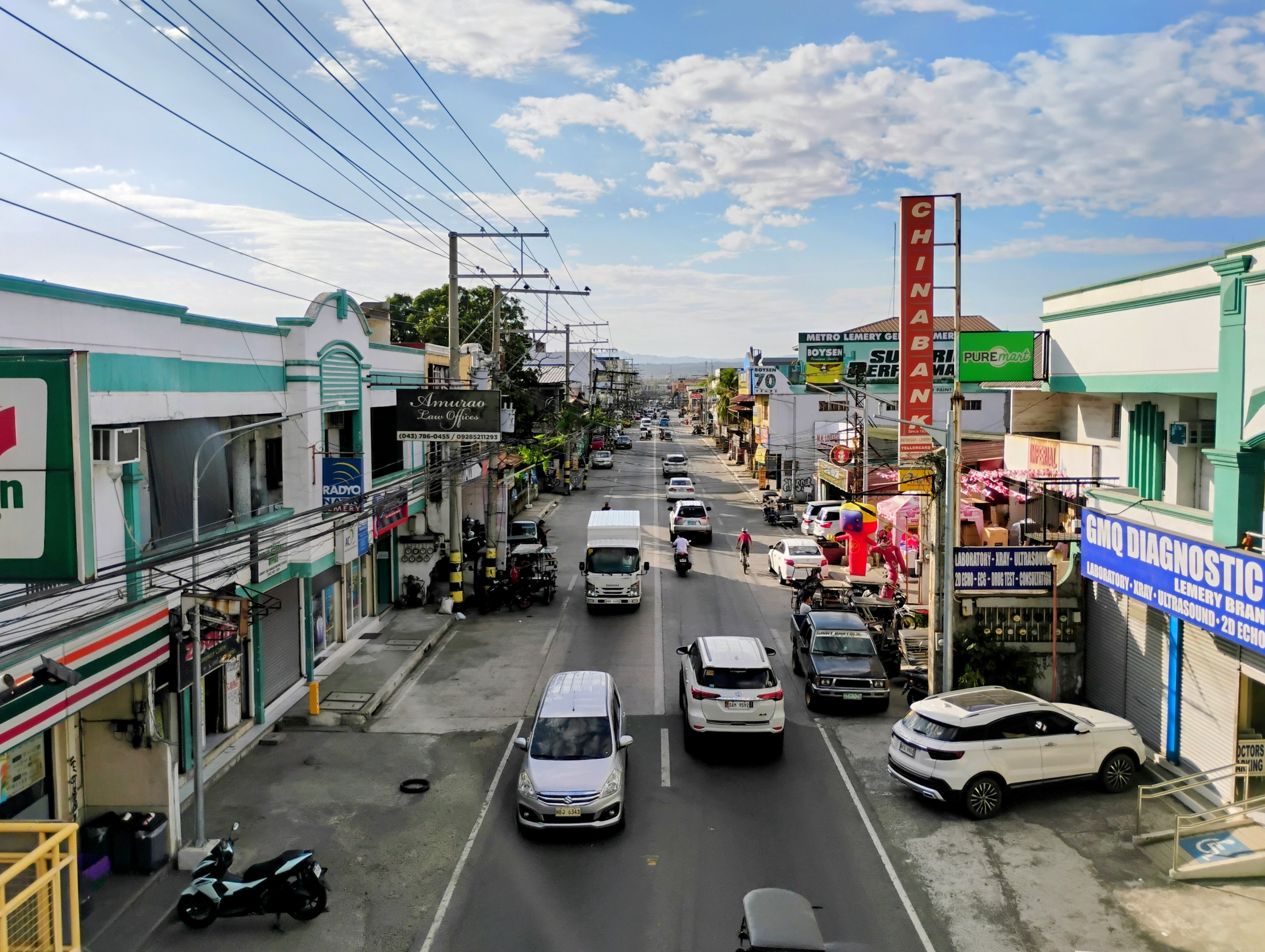
Lemery Town Proper

Lemery is politically subdivided into 46 barangays, as shown in the matrix below. Each barangay consists of puroks and some have sitios.

In 1957, the sitio of Bagong Pook was separated from the barrio of Arumahan and constituted into an independent barrio, while sitio of Masalisi was separated from Payapa.

PSGC	Barangay	Population			±% p.a.	
		2024		2010		
041012001	Anak‑Dagat	1.9%	1,803	1,715	▴	0.35%
041012002	Arumahan	2.5%	2,403	2,273	▴	0.39%
041012003	Ayao‑iyao	3.9%	3,683	2,690	▴	2.20%
041012004	Bagong Pook	1.4%	1,336	1,173	▴	0.90%
041012005	Bagong Sikat	1.5%	1,375	1,375	Steady	0.00%
041012006	Balanga	1.1%	1,050	955	▴	0.66%
041012007	Bukal	2.3%	2,159	1,814	▴	1.21%
041012009	Cahilan I	2.3%	2,189	2,021	▴	0.55%
041012010	Cahilan II	1.7%	1,631	1,519	▴	0.49%
041012011	Dayapan	2.8%	2,674	2,599	▴	0.20%
041012012	Dita	1.4%	1,281	1,167	▴	0.65%
041012013	Gulod	1.9%	1,791	1,598	▴	0.79%
041012014	Lucky	1.0%	909	622	▴	2.66%
041012015	Maguihan	2.6%	2,450	1,933	▴	1.65%
041012016	Mahabang Dahilig	2.0%	1,873	1,584	▴	1.17%
041012017	Mahayahay	1.6%	1,505	1,466	▴	0.18%
041012018	Maigsing Dahilig	1.2%	1,168	901	▴	1.81%
041012020	Maligaya	1.4%	1,281	1,199	▴	0.46%
041012021	Malinis	2.1%	2,030	1,657	▴	1.41%
041012022	Masalisi	1.1%	1,054	997	▴	0.39%
041012023	Mataas na Bayan	3.2%	3,035	2,764	▴	0.65%
041012024	Matingain I	3.7%	3,543	3,098	▴	0.93%
041012025	Matingain II	1.5%	1,449	1,285	▴	0.83%
041012026	Mayasang	2.6%	2,439	2,439	Steady	0.00%
041012027	Niogan	1.6%	1,537	1,443	▴	0.44%
041012028	Nonong Casto	3.3%	3,130	2,653	▴	1.15%
041012029	Palanas	3.3%	3,103	2,638	▴	1.13%
041012030	Payapa Ibaba	2.2%	2,089	1,859	▴	0.81%
041012031	Payapa Ilaya	3.6%	3,457	3,127	▴	0.70%
041012032	District I (Poblacion)	1.5%	1,413	1,164	▴	1.35%
041012033	District II (Poblacion)	1.0%	917	1,071	▾	−1.07%
041012034	District III (Poblacion)	0.5%	442	268	▴	3.52%
041012035	District IV (Poblacion)	2.3%	2,223	1,762	▴	1.62%
041012036	Rizal	0.8%	794	721	▴	0.67%
041012037	Sambal Ibaba	2.2%	2,050	1,737	▴	1.15%
041012038	Sambal Ilaya	4.5%	4,265	3,745	▴	0.90%
041012039	San Isidro Ibaba	1.6%	1,484	1,368	▴	0.56%
041012040	San Isidro Itaas	3.7%	3,507	2,777	▴	1.63%
041012041	Sangalang	2.2%	2,101	1,937	▴	0.56%
041012043	Talaga	3.5%	3,291	2,784	▴	1.16%
041012044	Tubigan	1.5%	1,390	1,016	▴	2.19%
041012045	Tubuan	1.2%	1,151	1,109	▴	0.26%
041012046	Wawa Ibaba	3.1%	2,934	2,593	▴	0.86%
041012047	Wawa Ilaya	1.9%	1,779	1,523	▴	1.08%
041012048	Sinisian East	2.1%	1,977	1,890	▴	0.31%
041012049	Sinisian West	2.1%	2,012	1,796	▴	0.79%
	Total		94,736	81,825	▴	1.02%

=== Climate ===
Climate data for Lemery, Batangas
Month	Jan	Feb	Mar	Apr	May	Jun	Jul	Aug	Sep	Oct	Nov	Dec	Year
Mean daily maximum °C (°F)	29 (84)	30 (86)	31 (88)	33 (91)	32 (90)	30 (86)	29 (84)	29 (84)	29 (84)	29 (84)	29 (84)	29 (84)	30 (86)
Mean daily minimum °C (°F)	20 (68)	20 (68)	21 (70)	22 (72)	24 (75)	24 (75)	24 (75)	24 (75)	24 (75)	23 (73)	22 (72)	21 (70)	22 (72)
Average precipitation mm (inches)	11 (0.4)	13 (0.5)	14 (0.6)	32 (1.3)	101 (4.0)	142 (5.6)	208 (8.2)	187 (7.4)	175 (6.9)	131 (5.2)	68 (2.7)	39 (1.5)	1,121 (44.3)
Average rainy days	5.2	5.0	7.4	11.5	19.8	23.5	27.0	25.9	25.2	23.2	15.5	8.3	197.5
Source: Meteoblue (modeled/calculated data, not measured locally)

== Demographics ==
Population census of Lemery

Year	Pop.	±% p.a.
1903	11,150	—
1918	15,647	+2.28%
1939	19,207	+0.98%
1948	23,879	+2.45%
1960	23,700	−0.06%
1970	32,337	+3.15%

Year	Pop.	±% p.a.
1975	36,207	+2.29%
1980	42,783	+3.39%
1990	53,932	+2.34%
1995	58,073	+1.40%
2000	66,528	+2.96%
2007	76,090	+1.87%

Year	Pop.	±% p.a.
2010	81,825	+2.68%
2015	93,157	+2.50%
2020	93,186	+0.01%
2024	94,736	+0.40%

Source: Philippine Statistics Authority

In the 2024 census, Lemery had a population of 94,736 people. The population density was 860 inhabitants per square kilometer (2,200/sq mi).

Most of the people in Lemery are Tagalogs. In recent years, there has been a noticeable increase of Visayans in some barrios or barangays. The main language spoken is Tagalog, and a significant number now speaks Cebuano and Hiligaynon. Most of the residents can also understand and speak English.

== Economy ==
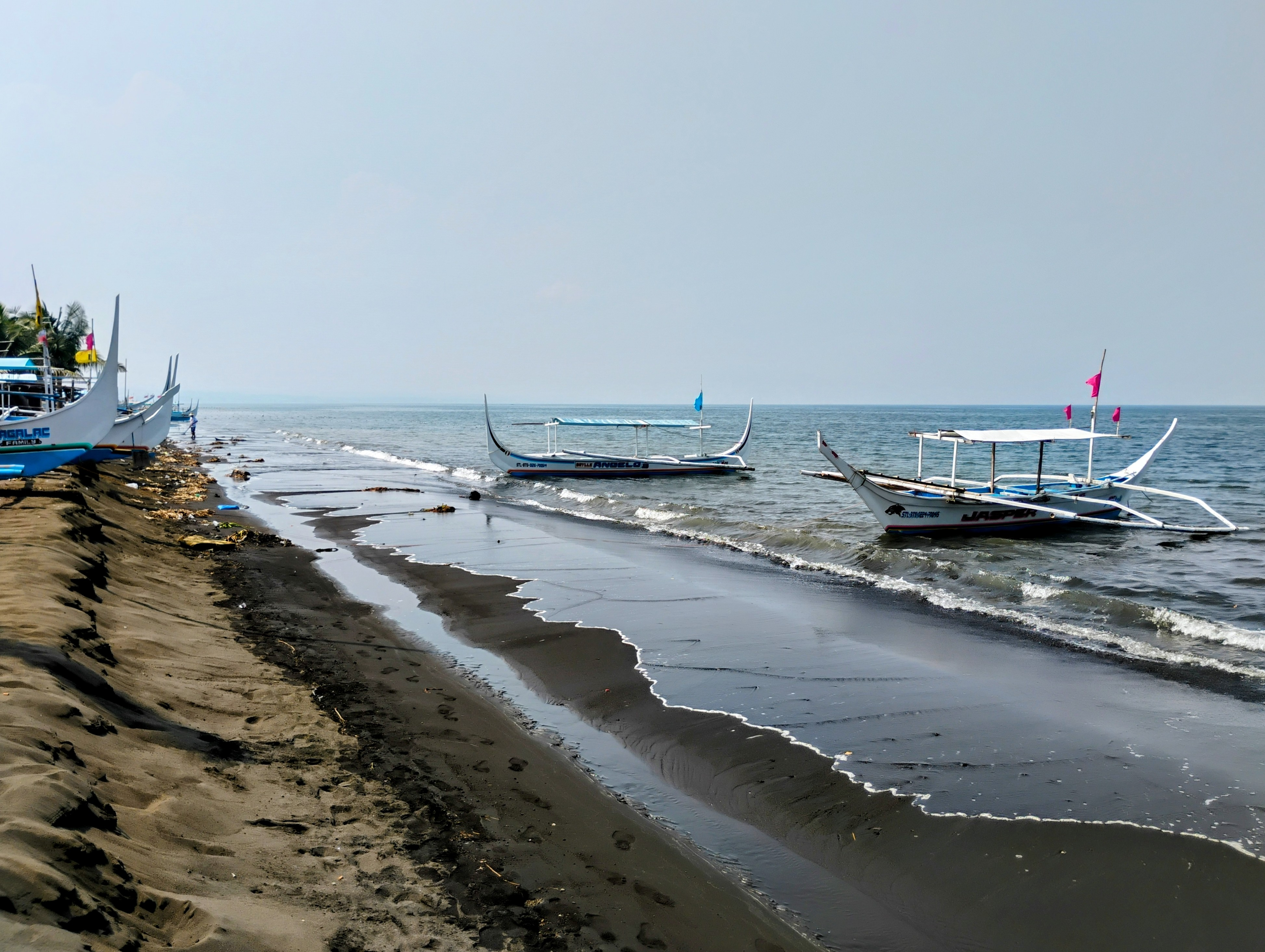
A beach in Lemery, along the Balayan Bay.

Poverty incidence of Lemery (%)

Source: Philippine Statistics Authority

Lemery is a growing urban center in western Batangas. In the Rankings of Cities and Municipalities that are based on the sum of their scores on 3 Pillars: Economic Dynamism, Government Efficiency, and Infrastructure. In 2016, Lemery ranked 75th out of 479 municipalities, with total score of 28.252921.

Lemery is a first class municipality by income classification. The primary source of income is agricultural activities, including crop production, livestock and poultry, with 30 out of 46 barangays involved in it. As a coastal municipality with 13 barangays located along the shore, fishing activities are also significant contributor to the local economy.

The municipality also serves as a provincial urban center for its surrounding rural municipalities including Taal, San Nicolas, Agoncillo and San Luis. It hosts the largest public high school in the first legislative district of Batangas, a private college (Lemery Colleges), a campus of a public university (Batangas State University)and the Batangas Provincial Hospital. Furthermore, bus lines from Manila serving the Southern Tagalog Region reach Central Batangas by way of Lemery. Vans also connect the town to and from other urban centers in the region such as Dasmariñas, Calamba and Lucena.

In February 2014, Xentro Mall Lemery, a community mall, opened in the Diversion Road, further cementing Lemery's position as a growing commercial center. In December 2017, SM Center Lemery opened.

== Transportation ==
Lemery is accessible by bus from Manila via the South Luzon Expressway (SLEX). The Lipa-Lemery Road connects the STAR Tollway in Lipa to Lemery, passing a number of municipalities along the southern shores of Taal Lake. Lemery can also be reached from Tagaytay via the Diokno Highway. Furthermore, there are vans connecting Manila to Lemery.

== Government ==
=== Local government ===
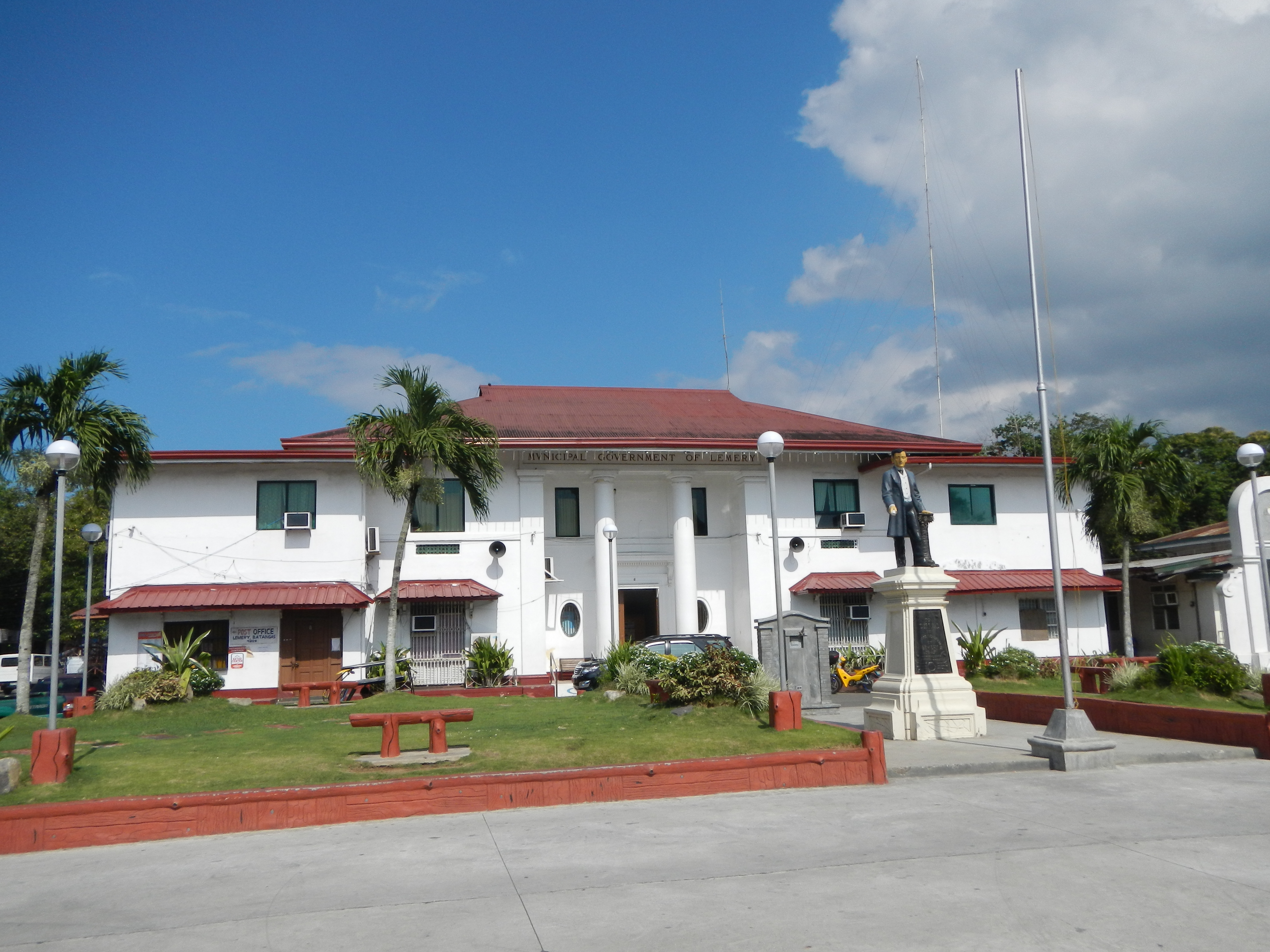
Municipal hall

Elected officials:

- Mayor: Ian Kenneth M. Alilio
- Vice Mayor: Hannah Beatriz C. Cabral
- Councilors:
  - Jayvee C.
  - Jude V. Suayan
  - Bienvenido C. Villanueva
  - Ivanna Pauline G. Malabanan
  - Benedtct M. Miiranda
  - Christopher Jones M. Bello
  - Rosendo R. Eguia
  - Christopher P. Alilio

== Health ==
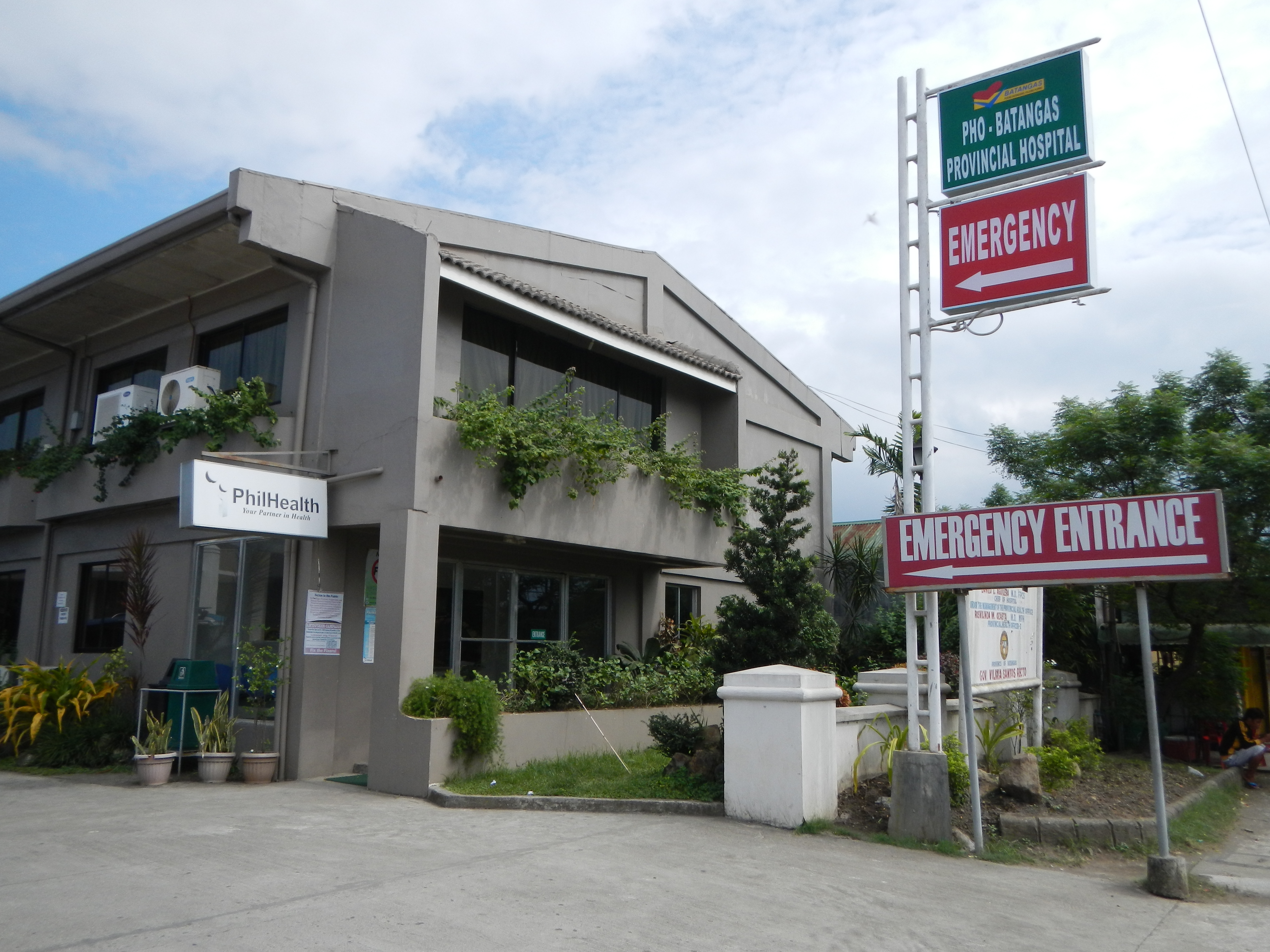
Batangas Provincial Hospital

Some of the health institutions in Lemery include:

- Batangas Provincial Hospital
- Metro Lemery Medical Center
- Our Lady of Caysasay Medical Center
- Lemery Doctors Medical Center
- Little Angels Medical Hospital

== Education ==
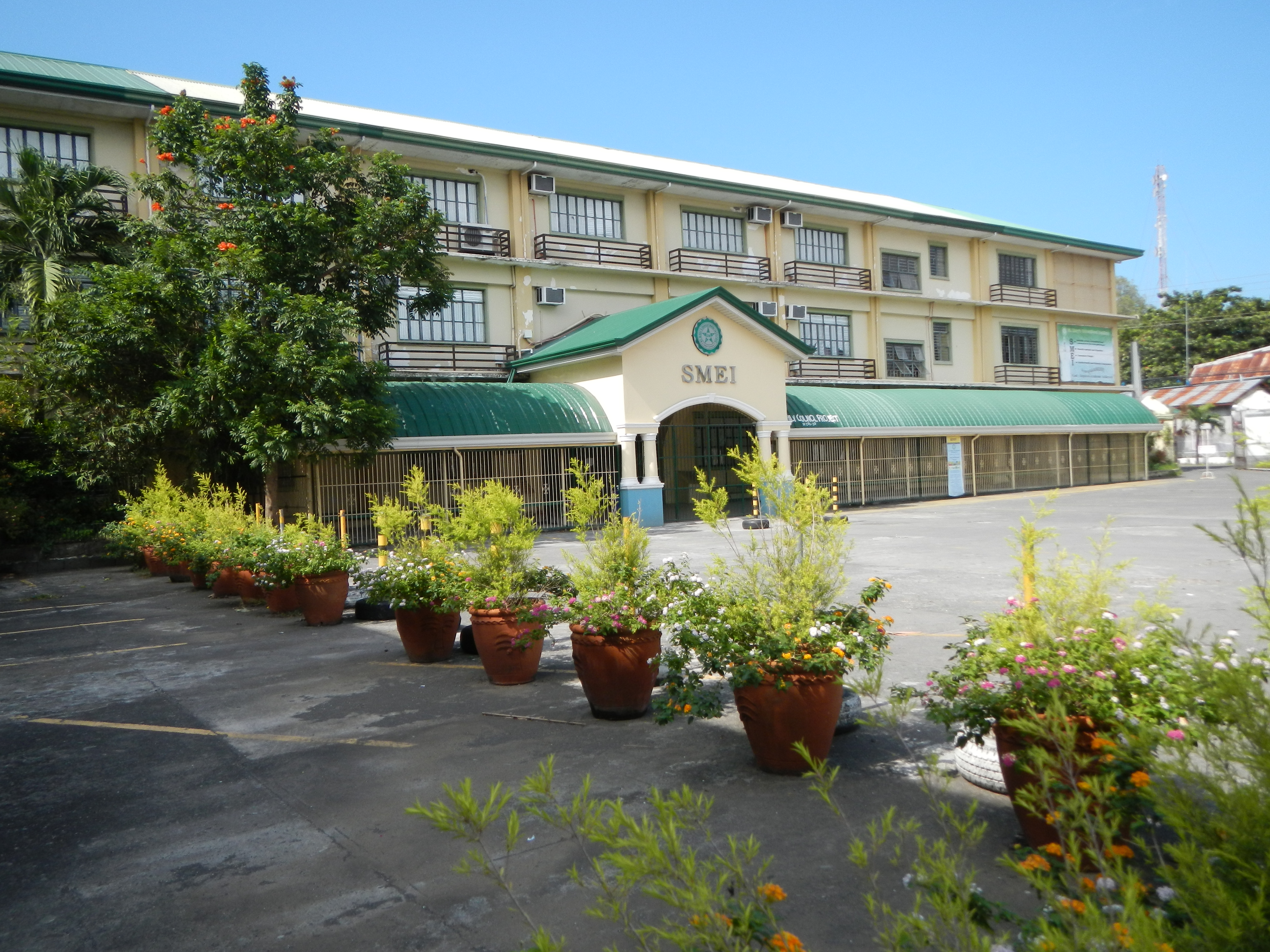
Saint Mary's Educational Institute

The Lemery Schools District Office governs all educational institutions within the municipality. It oversees the management and operations of all private and public, from primary to secondary schools. Schools in Lemery include:

=== Primary and elementary schools ===
- Academy for Able Children with Exceptionalities
- Arumahan Elementary School
- Ayao-Iyao Elementary School
- Bagong Paraiso Elementary School
- Bukal Elementary School
- Christian Knights Academy
- Dayapan Elementary School
- Diezmos Learning Center
- Dita Elementary School
- Doña Matilde Memorial Elementary School
- Escuela De Shalom
- Esteban E. Vito Memorial Elementary School
- Glorious Faith Christian School
- Gulod Elementary School
- Lemery Christian Academy
- Lemery Pilot Elementary School
- Kaleidoscope Therapy and Learning Center
- Mahayahay Elementary School
- Maranatha Shekinah Christian School
- Marcos Catibug Memorial Elementary School
- Masalisi Elementary School
- Niogan Elementary School
- Mayasang Elementary School
- Payapa Elementary School
- Payapa Ibaba Elementary School
- Philadelphia Montessorian Academy
- R. Concepcion Montessori School
- R. Venturanza Central School
- Saint Mary's Educational Institute
- Sambal Elementary School
- San Isidro Itaas Elementary School
- San Isidro Labac Elementary School
- Sinisian Elementary School
- Stanford School of Batangas
- Swiss Montessori School
- Talaga Elementary School
- Tubuan Elementary School
- Universal Scholastic Academe
- V. Ornales Memorial Elementary School

=== Secondary schools ===
- Ananias C. Hernandez Memorial National High School
- Dionisio P. Vito National High School
- Gov. Feliciano Leviste Memorial National High School
- Lemery Colleges (High School)
- Lemery Senior High School
- Payapa National High School
- Payapa Senior High School

=== Higher educational institutions ===
- Batangas State University
- Lemery Colleges

== Notable personalities ==
- Maloi Ricalde - member of Pinoy pop group Bini
- Eric Camson - PBA player
