= Lemery Church =

Roman Catholic church in Batangas, Philippines

San Roque Parish - Lemery
- Parokya ni San Roque (Filipino); Paroquia de San Roque (Spanish)
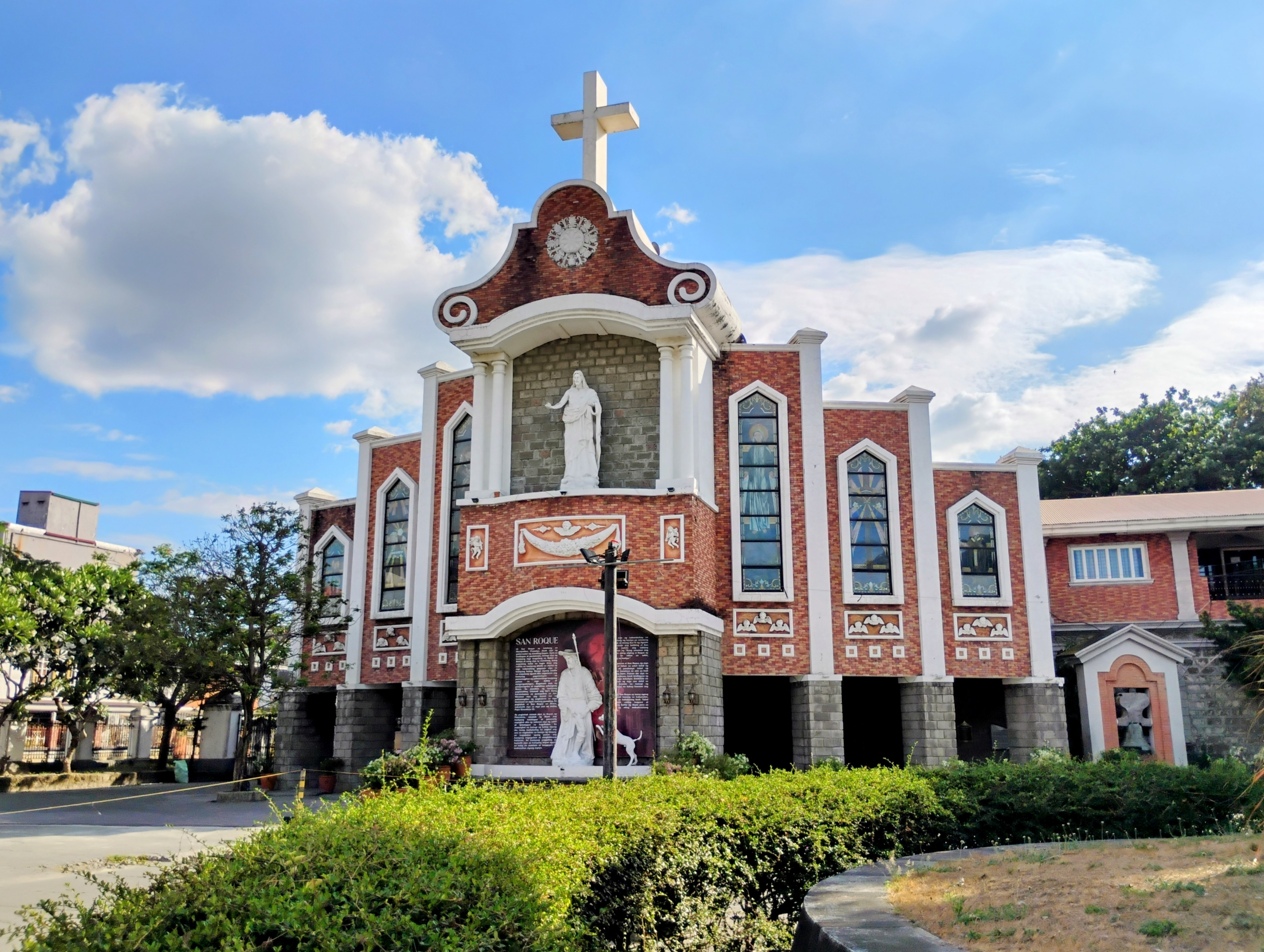
- Church facade in 2026

- Location in Luzon Location in the Philippines
- 13°52′59″N 120°54′48″E
- Location: Illustre Avenue, Poblacion Lemery, Batangas
- Country: Philippines
- Denomination: Roman Catholic

History
- Status: Parish
- Founded: 1866
- Founder: Augustinians
- Dedication: Saint Roch

Architecture
- Functional status: Active
- Architectural type: Church building
- Style: Neo-classic
- Completed: 1887

Administration
- Archdiocese: Lipa

Clergy
- Priest: Rev. Fr. Joseph Rodem Ramos

The San Roque Parish Church, also known as Lemery Church, is a Roman Catholic church in the municipality of Lemery, Batangas, in the Philippines. It is under the jurisdiction of the Archdiocese of Lipa. Dedicated to San Roque and to Nuestra Señora Divina Gracia as its secondary patron. The fiesta is celebrated every August 16 in honor of St Roch. The feast of the Our Lady of Divine Grace is celebrated every August 14. With the traditional "Tagpuan" (formerly Sunduan) held every year near Barangay Wawa every August 14, the vespera of the Assumption of Mary. The parish became independent from Taal by the order of Manila's archbishop on May 12, 1868. The parish celebrated its 150th anniversary in 2018.

On May 20, 2025, the local Church enshrined a first class relic of San Roque (from the bone). On June 7, 2025, the new Parish Altar and edifice was dedicated by Most Rev. Gilbert A. Garcera, Archbishop of Lipa. Five years after the church was damaged during the 2020 Taal Volacano Eruption.

== History ==
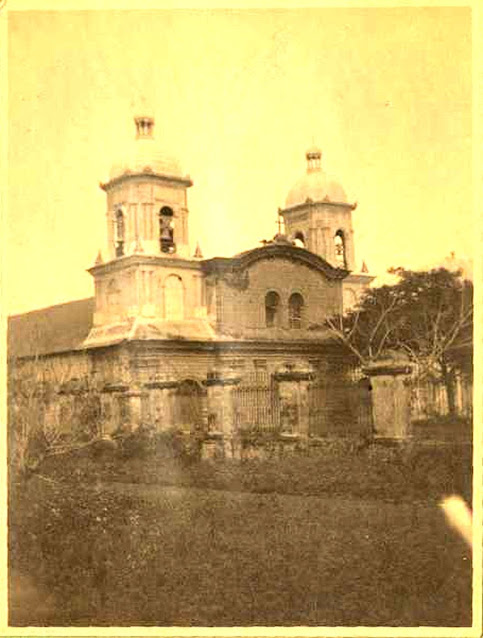
Lemery Church, circa 1911

Originally a barrio of Taal under the name of San Genaro, it was separated from Taal in 1862, under the new name of "Lemery", and was accepted by the Augustinian Chapter in 1866. In 1867, Fr. Jose Martin started the construction of a church made of hew stone. Fr. Raymundo Cortazar finished the church in 1880 and the cemetery in 1887. The church originally featured a baroque facade flanked by twin towers. The facade of the church was damaged in the Liberation of 1945. The facade was demolished in 1968 to pave the way for a new one; both facade and twin towers were pulled down to give may to modern cement structure. It is said that the facade was sinking due to its weight.

The church underwent renovations in 2013, remodeling the post-war facade. The renovation included a new altar mayor, new side altars and the addition of new paintings.

In 2020, the church was badly damaged during the 2020 Taal Volcano eruption which caused the Parish structure to sink due to liquifaction and fissures. The COVID-19 pandemic added to the challenges faced due to this.

On May 20, 2025, the Parish enshrined the relic of San Roque (from the bone). On June 7, 2025, the new Altar, Sacristy and edifice was blessed and dedicated by Most Rev. Gilbert A. Garcera, Archbishop of Lipa.

== Gallery ==
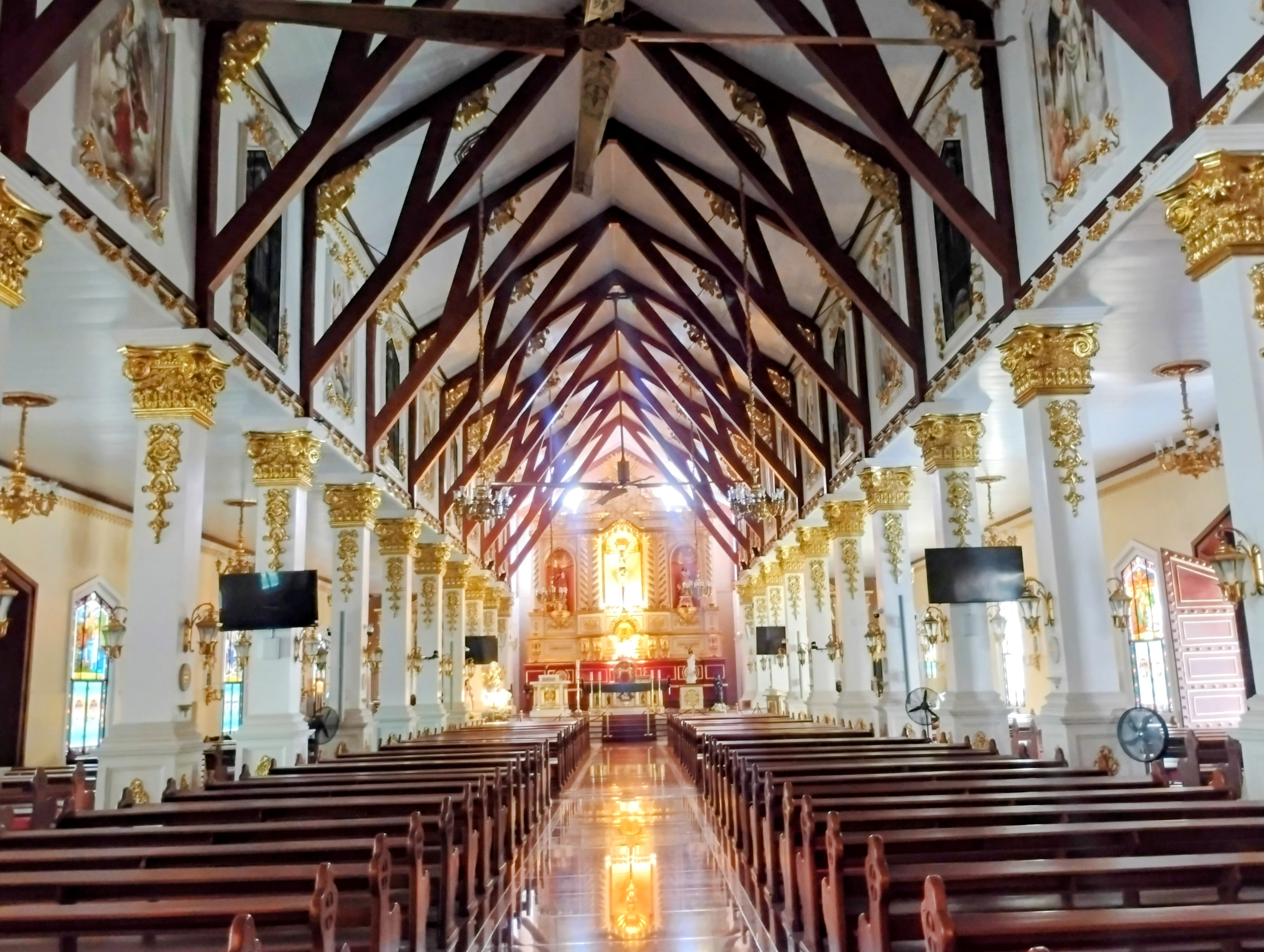
Church interior in 2026

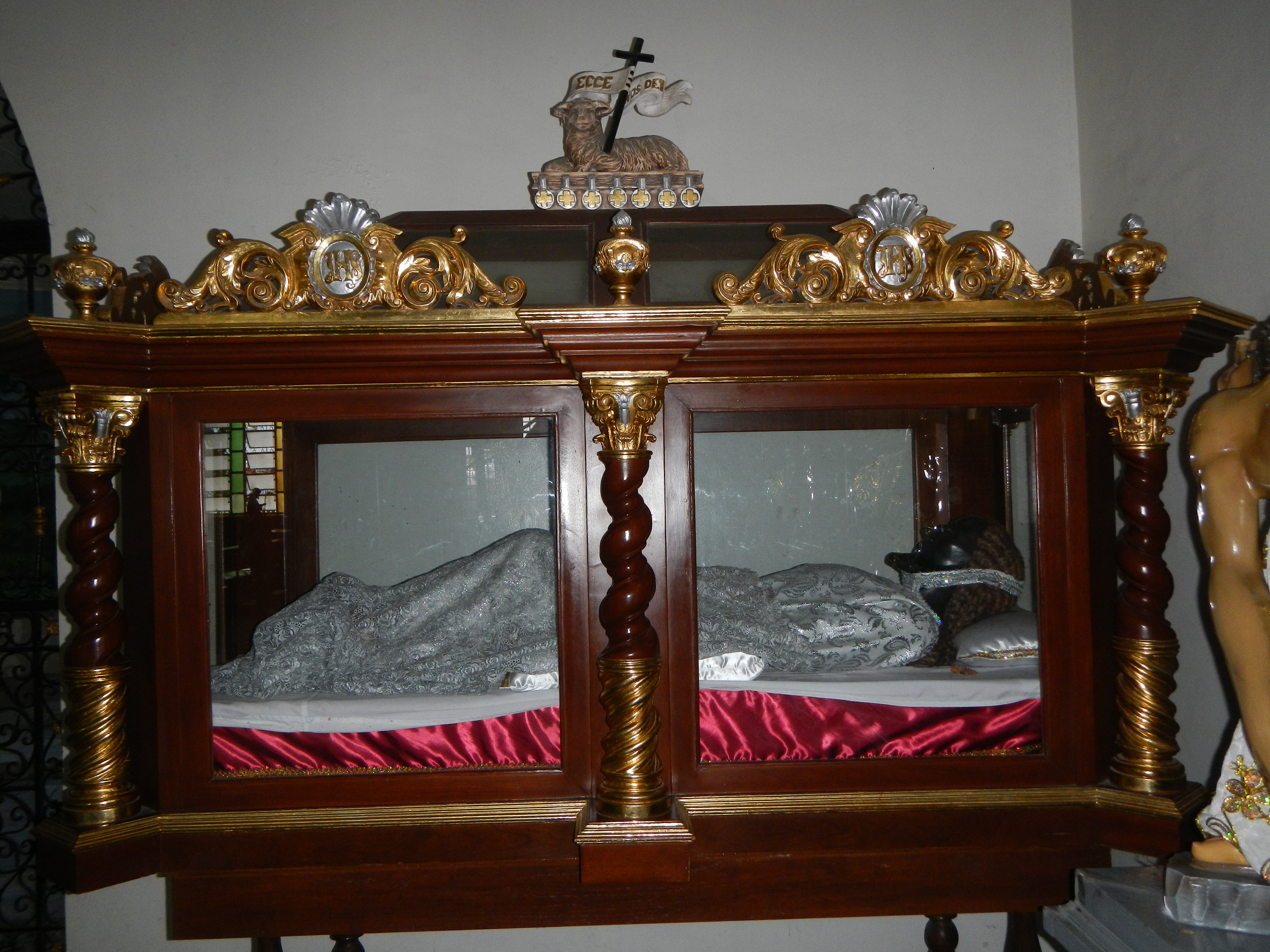
Santo Entierro

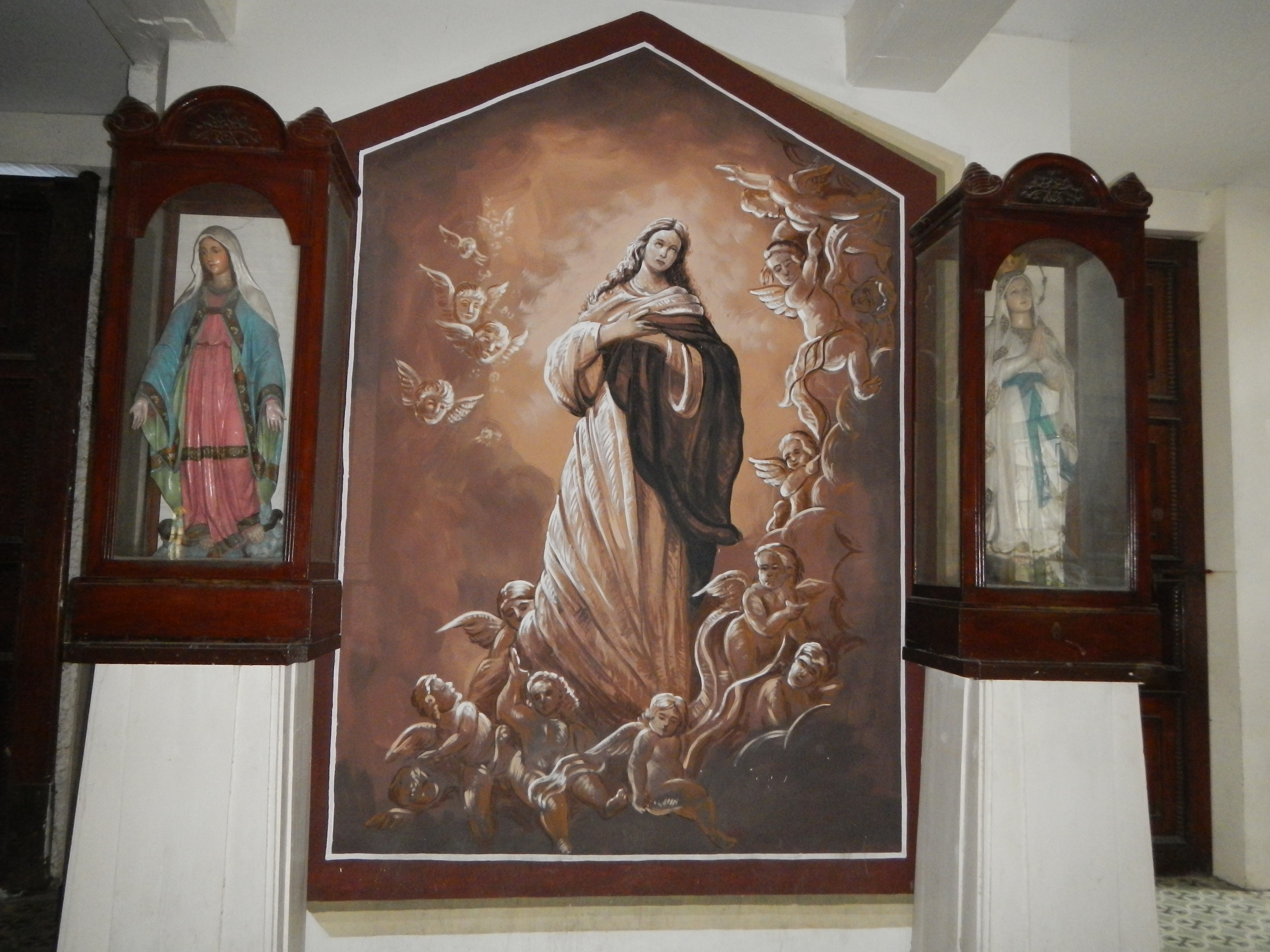
Painting of Immaculate Conception

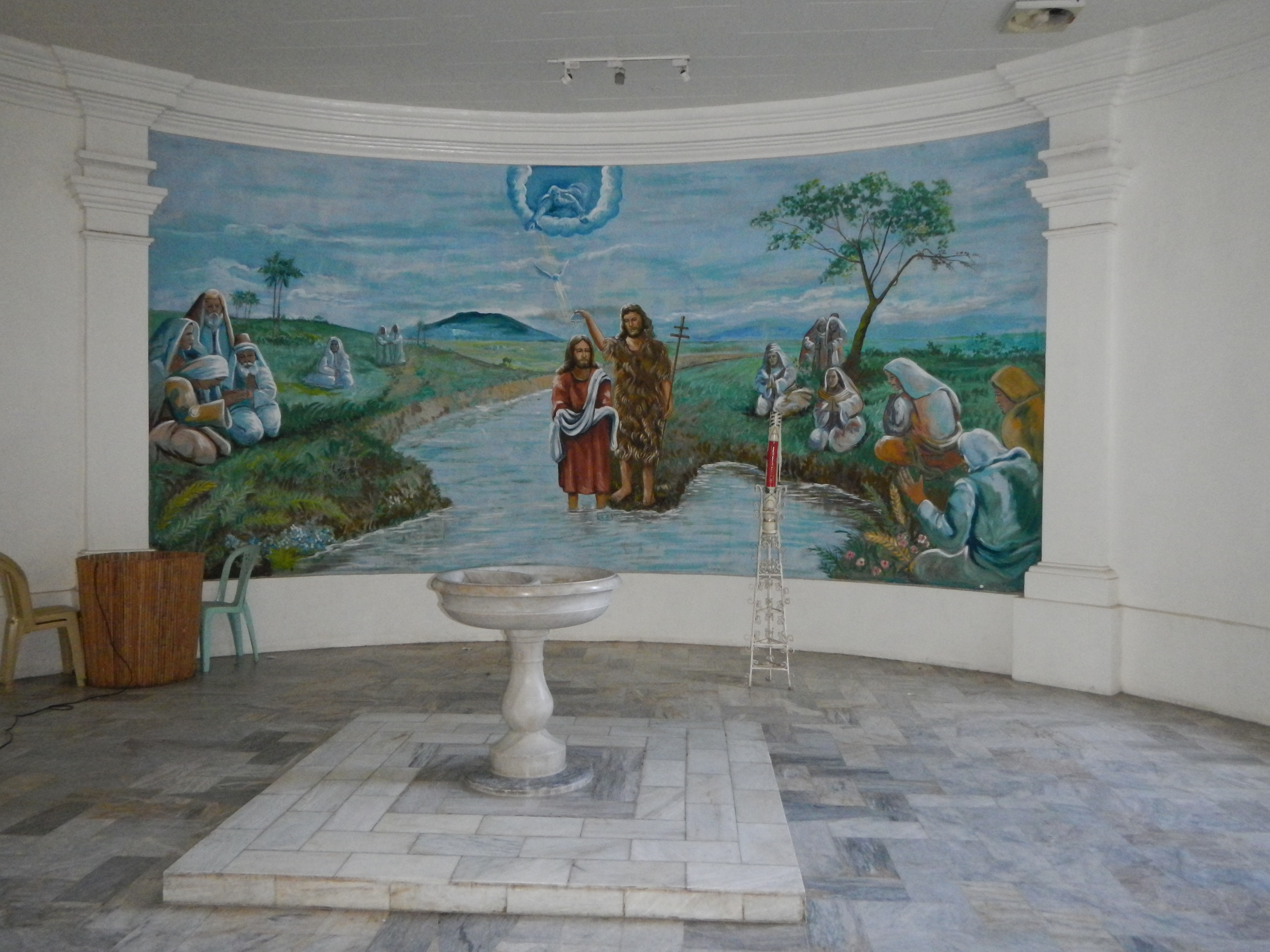
Baptistery

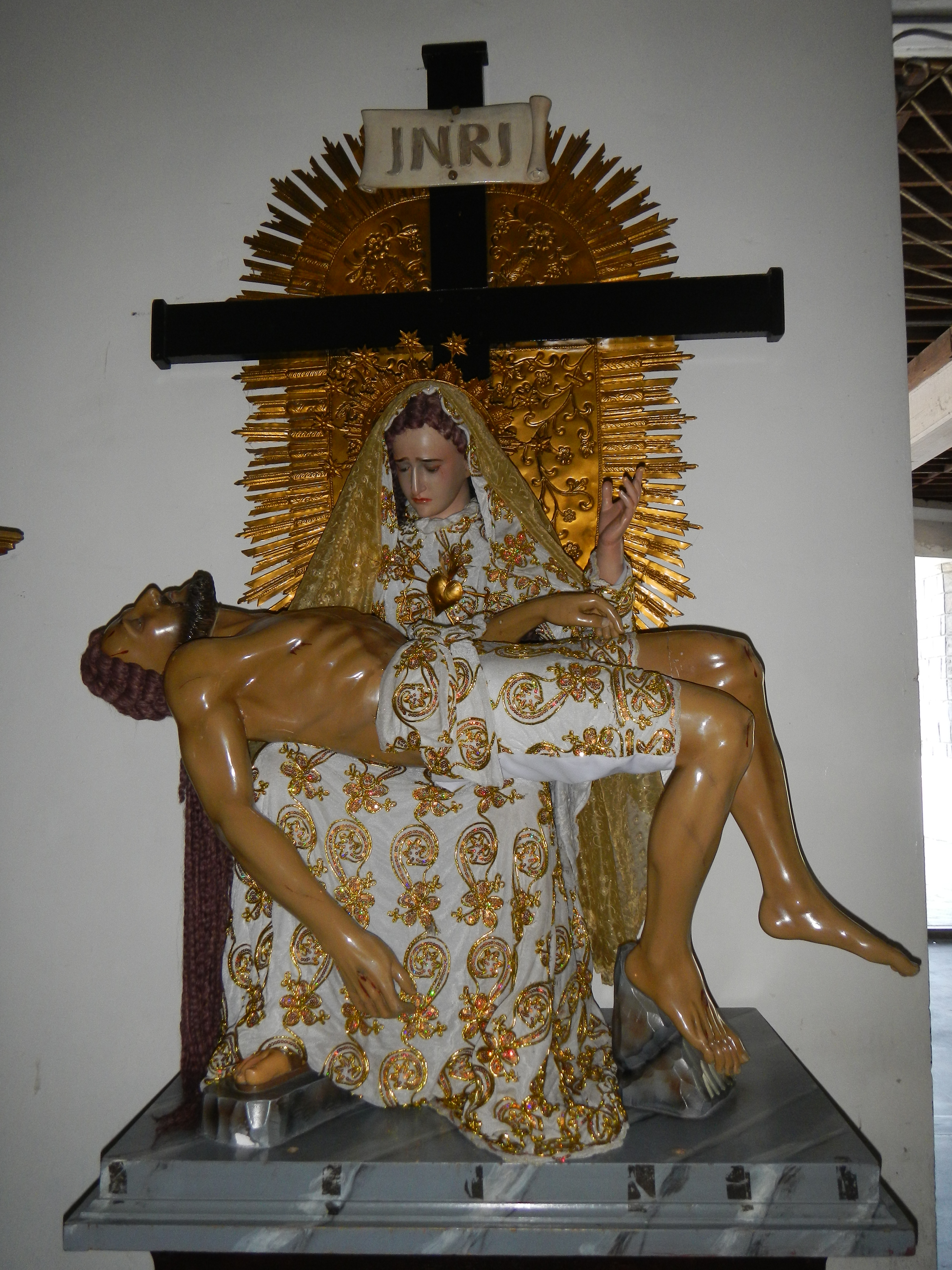
Pieta
