= Radial Road 1 =

Route in Metro Manila

R-1 Radial Road 1
- R-1 Road
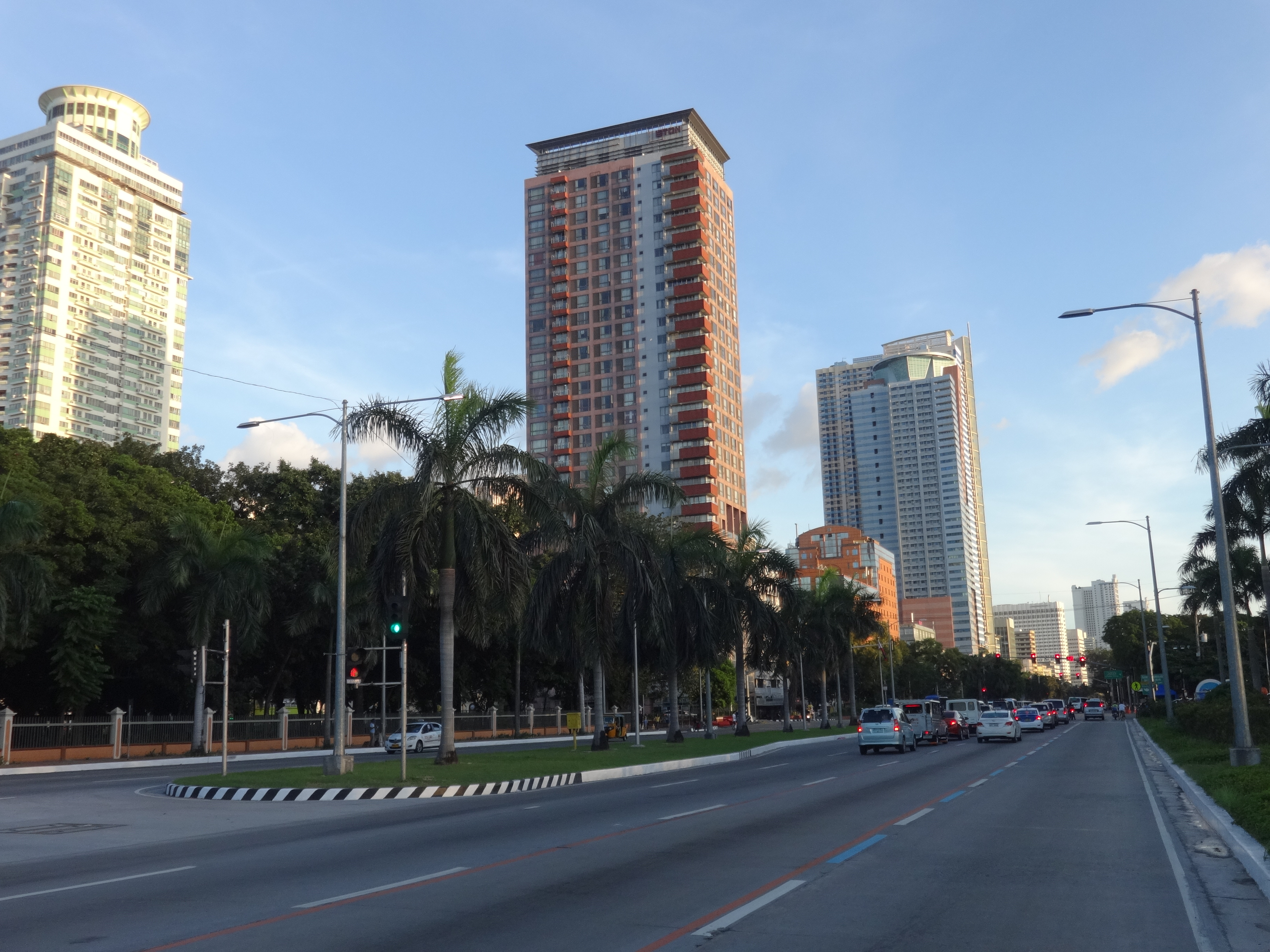
- Roxas Boulevard at kilometer zero in Manila, a portion of Radial Road 1

Route information
- Maintained by the Department of Public Works and Highways, (Note: Non-expressway sections only.) the Metropolitan Manila Development Authority, (Note: Non-expressway sections in Metro Manila only.) and Cavite Infrastructure Corporation (Note: Expressway sections only.)
- Length: 42.67 km (26.51 mi)
- Component highways: AH 26 (N120) in Manila and Pasay; N61 in Pasay and Parañaque; E3 from Parañaque to Kawit; N64 from Kawit to Tanza; N402 from Tanza to Naic

Major junctions
- North end: Anda Circle in Manila
- South end: N403 (Governor's Drive) in Naic, Cavite

Location
- Country: Philippines
- Provinces: Cavite
- Major cities: Bacoor, General Trias, Imus, Las Piñas, Manila, Parañaque, and Pasay
- Towns: Kawit, Naic, Noveleta, and Tanza

Highway system
- Roads in the Philippines; Highways; Expressways; List

Radial Road 1 (R-1), informally known as the R-1 Road, is a network of roads and bridges which comprise the first arterial road of Metro Manila in the Philippines. Spanning some 42.67 kilometers (26.51 mi), it connects the cities and municipalities of Bacoor, General Trias, Imus, Kawit, Las Piñas, Manila, Naic, Noveleta, Parañaque, Pasay, and Tanza in Cavite and Metro Manila.

== Route description ==
=== Bonifacio Drive ===
Between Anda Circle and Padre Burgos Avenue, R-1 is known as Bonifacio Drive. It serves the districts of Intramuros and Port Area and meets Roxas Boulevard in Rizal Park.

=== Roxas Boulevard ===
R-1 becomes Roxas Boulevard after intersecting with Padre Burgos Avenue. This section of R-1 passes through Kilometer Zero of the Philippines in Rizal Park. Roxas Boulevard is a waterfront promenade that leads out of Ermita and Malate in Manila into Pasay and Parañaque. It ends at the junction with NAIA Road and Seaside Drive.

=== Manila–Cavite Expressway ===
Between the NAIA Road and Covelandia Road in Kawit, Cavite, R-1 is known as the Manila–Cavite Expressway (also known as Coastal Road and CAVITEX). This toll road connects Parañaque with Las Piñas and leaves Metro Manila for Bacoor and Kawit in the province of Cavite.

=== Covelandia Road ===
R-1 briefly merges with Covelandia Road until it meets Antero Soriano Highway at the intersection with Tirona Highway.

=== Antero Soriano Highway ===
R-1 is known as the Antero Soriano Highway from Covelandia Road's terminus in Kawit to Governor's Drive in Naic. It connects the Cavite municipalities of Noveleta, Rosario, and Tanza and the cities of General Trias and Imus along the coast of Manila Bay in Cavite.
