= Trece Martires–Indang Road =

Major highway in Calabarzon, Philippines

Trece Martires–Indang Road
- Trece–Indang Road; Tanza–Trece Martires City–Indang Road
- Trece Martires-Indang Road highlighted in red

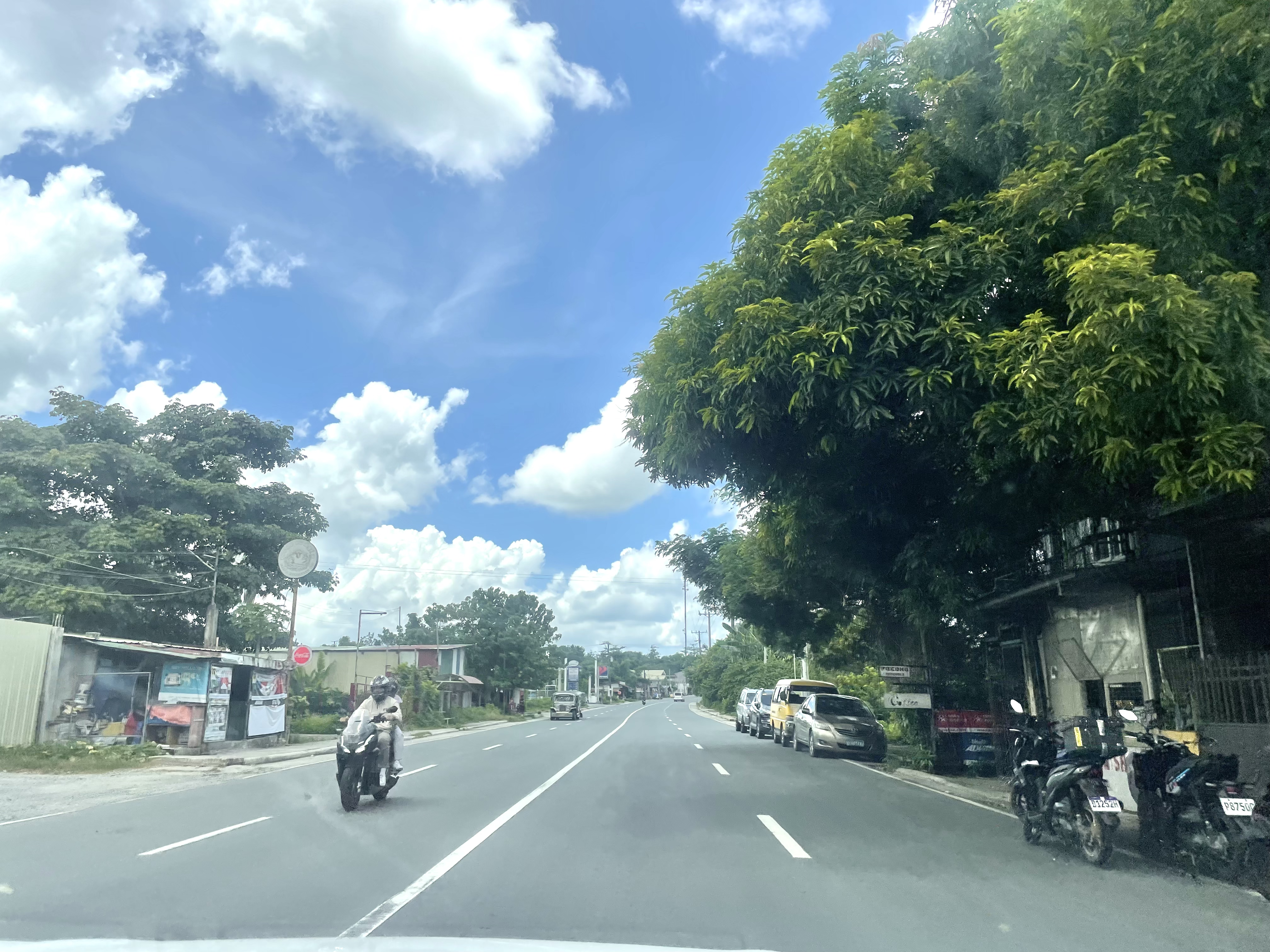
- A segment of the road in Mataas na Lupa, Indang

Route information
- Maintained by the Department of Public Works and Highways (DPWH) – Cavite 1st District Engineering Office
- Length: 12.015 km (7.466 mi)
- Existed: 1970s–present
- Component highways: N404

Major junctions
- North end: N64 (Tanza–Trece Martires Road) / N65 / N403 (Governor's Drive) in Trece Martires
- N402-1 (Indang–Alfonso Road) in Indang
- South end: N402 (Indang–Mendez Road) in Indang

Location
- Country: Philippines
- Provinces: Cavite
- Major cities: Trece Martires
- Towns: Indang

Highway system
- Roads in the Philippines; Highways; Expressways; List
← N403	→ N405

The Trece Martires–Indang Road (also known as Trece–Indang Road and Tanza-Trece Martires City-Indang Road) is a four-to-five lane 12.015-kilometer (7.466 mi) secondary highway in Cavite, Philippines.

Connecting the city of Trece Martires and the municipality of Indang, it is the primarily used national highway from Trece Martires to Tagaytay. The entire road is designated as National Route 404 (N404) of the Philippine highway network.

== Route description ==
The highway forms the Trece Martires to Indang segment of Tanza–Trece Martires City–Indang Road. It starts at the intersection with Governor's Drive (N65 and N403) and Tanza–Trece Martires Road (N64) in the city proper of Trece Martires, as the physical continuation of the latter. It then runs south towards Indang, where it turns west in Barangay Alulod as it bypasses the town proper as San Francisco Javier Road and Mendez-Buna-Indang Road. It ends at the Y-intersection with Indang–Mendez Road (N402).

== Intersections ==
The entire route is located in Cavite. Intersections are numbered by kilometer posts, with Rizal Park in Manila designated as kilometer zero.

City/Municipality	km	mi	Destinations	Notes
Trece Martires	47.148	29.296	N65 (Tanza–Trece Martires Road) – Tanza, Manila	Northern terminus; Continues north as Tanza–Trece Martires Road. South from here it is one-way until the intersection with Thirteen Martyrs Avenue and Capitol Road
Trece Martires			N64 (Thirteen Martyrs Avenue)	Although officially unsigned, Motorists using N64 are required to use Trece Martires–Indang Road and Thirteen Martyrs Avenue to continue to Governor's Drive.
Indang	54.662	33.965	Alulod Bridge	
Indang	57.121	35.493	Saluysoy Bridge	
Indang	57.530	35.747	N402-1 (Indang–Alfonso Road) – Alfonso, Naic	
Indang	59.137	36.746	N402 (San Gregorio Extension, Indang–Mendez Road) – Mendez, Tagaytay	Southern terminus
1.000 mi = 1.609 km; 1.000 km = 0.621 mi
