= Indang–Alfonso Road =

Road in Cavite, Philippines

- Indang–Alfonso via Luksuhin Road
- The route alignment of Indang–Alfonso Road

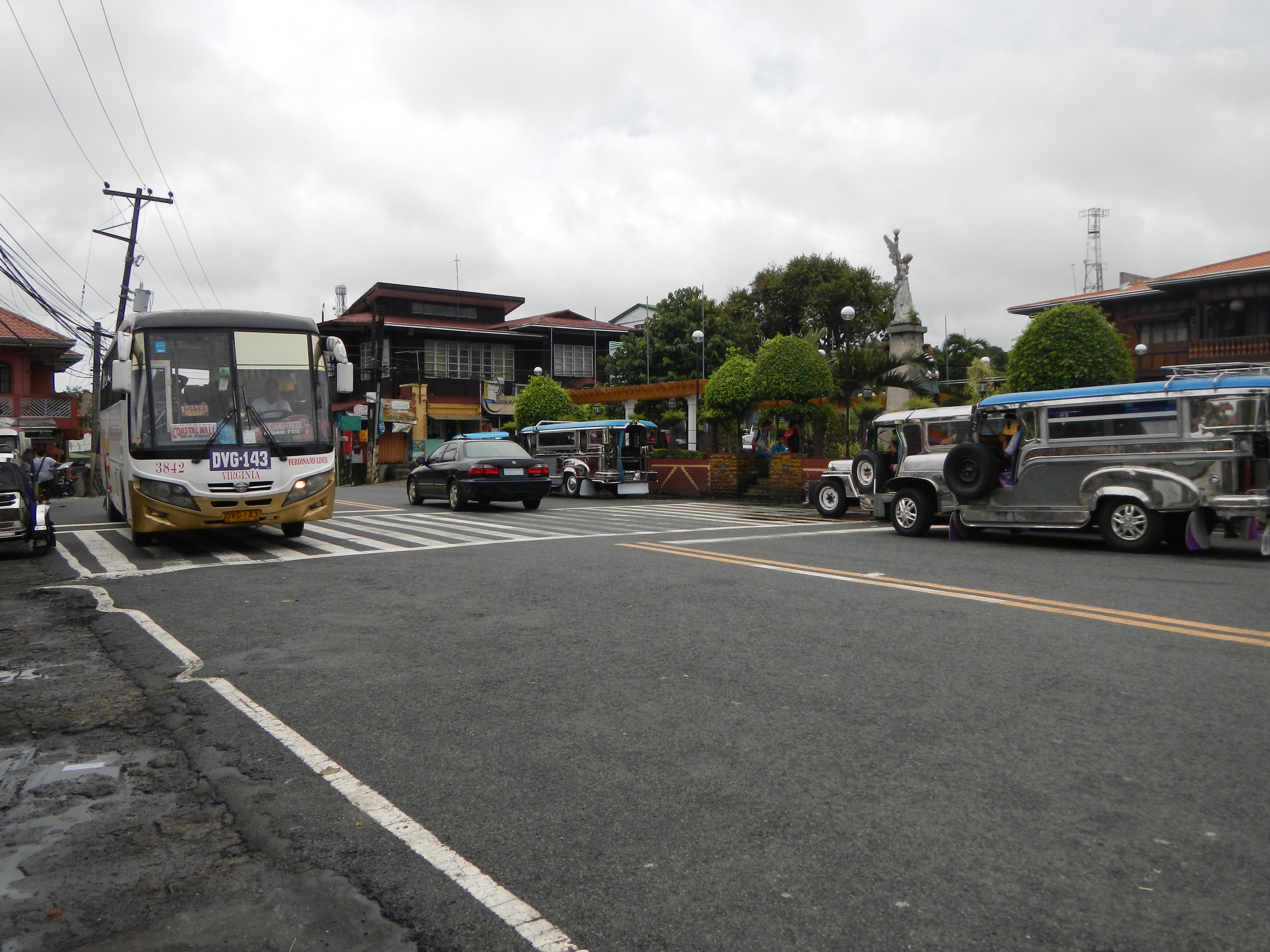
- A segment of the road in Indang

Route information
- Maintained by Department of Public Works and Highways (DPWH) - Cavite 2nd District Engineering Office
- Length: 18.51 km (11.50 mi)
- Component highways: N402-1

Major junctions
- East end: N404 (Trece Martires–Indang Road) in Indang
- N402 (Noveleta–Naic–Indang Road) in Indang
- Southwest end: N410 (Tagaytay–Nasugbu Highway) in Alfonso

Location
- Country: Philippines
- Provinces: Cavite
- Towns: Indang, Alfonso

Highway system
- Roads in the Philippines; Highways; Expressways; List

The Indang–Alfonso Road, officially known as the Indang–Alfonso via Luksuhin Road, is a 18.51-kilometer (11.50 mi), two-to-five lane, secondary road that connects the municipalities of Indang and Alfonso in Cavite, Philippines. Previously a tertiary road, it was upgraded as National Route 402-1 (N402-1) of the Philippine highway system.

== Alternative names ==
The road is officially known as it longer name, Indang–Alfonso via Luksuhin Road, as it traverses barangay Luksuhin in Alfonso, Cavite.

At the poblacion of Indang and Alfonso, the road has local alternative names. In Indang, it locally known as R. Jeciel, A. Mabini, J. Dimabiling, and Binambangan Streets, while in Alfonso, it is locally known as Avinante Road and Mabini Street, respectively. Its section between the Alfonso poblacion and Tagaytay–Nasugbu Highway is also known as Luksuhin–Mangas Road and Mangas–Alfonso Road.

== Intersections ==
The entire route is located in Cavite.

City/Municipality	km	mi	Destinations	Notes
Indang	55.530	34.505	N404 (Trece Martires–Indang Road) – Tagaytay, Trece Martires, Manila	Western Terminus. Kilometer number reverses.
Indang			N402 (Indang–Mendez Road) – Mendez, Tagaytay	
Indang			N402 (Naic–Indang Road) – Naic, Maragondon / Saint Gregory the Great Parish Church	
Indang			N402 (Naic–Indang Road) – Naic	
Indang			J. Dimabiling Street	
Indang	57.592	35.786	Bimambangan Bridge	
Indang	58.095	36.099	Kaytambog Bridge	
Indang	58.735	36.496	Lulungisan Bridge	
Indang	61.163	38.005	Banaba Bridge	
Indang	62.816	39.032	Lipa Bridge	
Indang–Alfonso boundary	64.976	40.374	Catmon Bridge	
Alfonso	66.368	41.239	Pajo Bridge	
Alfonso	66.862	41.546	Alas-As Street (Alfonso-Sinaliw-Kaytitinga Provincial Road)	right is going to Gen. Aguinaldo, Magallanes
Alfonso Kilometer Zero	67	42		
Alfonso	74.040	46.006	N410 (Tagaytay–Nasugbu Highway) – Tagaytay, Batangas	Southern Terminus.
1.000 mi = 1.609 km; 1.000 km = 0.621 mi: Incomplete access
