= Tanza–Trece Martires Road =

Major highway in Calabarzon, Philippines

Tanza–Trece Martires Road
- Tanza–Trece Martires Highway
- Route alignment of Tanza–Trece Martires Road

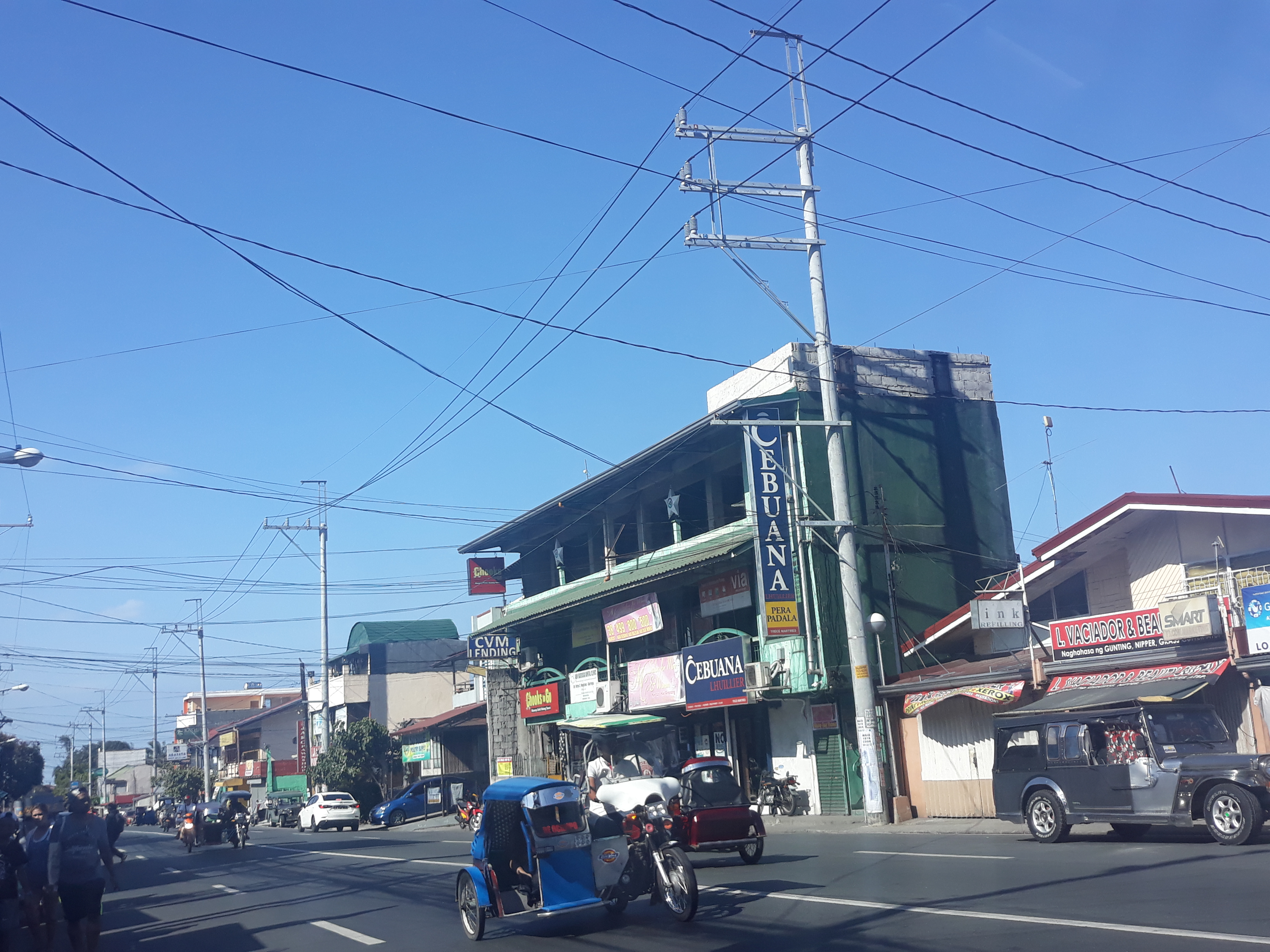
- The highway in Trece Martires

Route information
- Maintained by Department of Public Works and Highways (DPWH) - Cavite 1st District Engineering Office
- Length: 12.559 km (7.804 mi)
- Component highways: N64

Major junctions
- North end: N64 (Antero Soriano Highway) / N402 (Noveleta–Naic–Tagaytay Road) in Tanza
- South end: N404 (Trece Martires–Indang Road) / N65 / N403 (Governor's Drive) in Trece Martires

Location
- Country: Philippines
- Provinces: Cavite
- Major cities: Trece Martires
- Towns: Tanza

Highway system
- Roads in the Philippines; Highways; Expressways; List

The Tanza–Trece Martires Road (or Tanza–Trece Martires Highway) is a 12.559-kilometer (7.804 mi), two-to-four lane, primary highway in Cavite, Philippines. It connects the municipality of Tanza to the city of Trece Martires.

The entire road is designated as a component of National Route 64 (N64) of the Philippine highway network.

== Intersections ==
The entire route is located in Cavite. Intersections are numbered by kilometer posts, with Rizal Park in Manila designated as kilometer zero.

City/Municipality	km	mi	Destinations	Notes
Tanza	33.698	20.939	N64 (Antero Soriano Highway) / N402 (Antero Soriano Highway & San Agustin Street) – Kawit, Manila	Northern terminus. Continues north as N402 (San Agustin Street).
Tanza	42.000	26.098	Route 64 reassurance sign	
Tanza	39.691	24.663	Punta Bridge	
Trece Martires	47.000	29.204	Trece Martires kilometer zero	
Trece Martires	47.148	29.296	N65 / N403 (Governor's Drive) / N404 (Trece Martires–Indang Road) – Indang, Tagaytay, Naic, Dasmariñas	Southern terminus; Continues south as N404 (Trece Martires–Indang Road).
1.000 mi = 1.609 km; 1.000 km = 0.621 mi
