= N402 highway =

Highway in the Philippines

Route 402
- Noveleta–Naic–Tagaytay Road
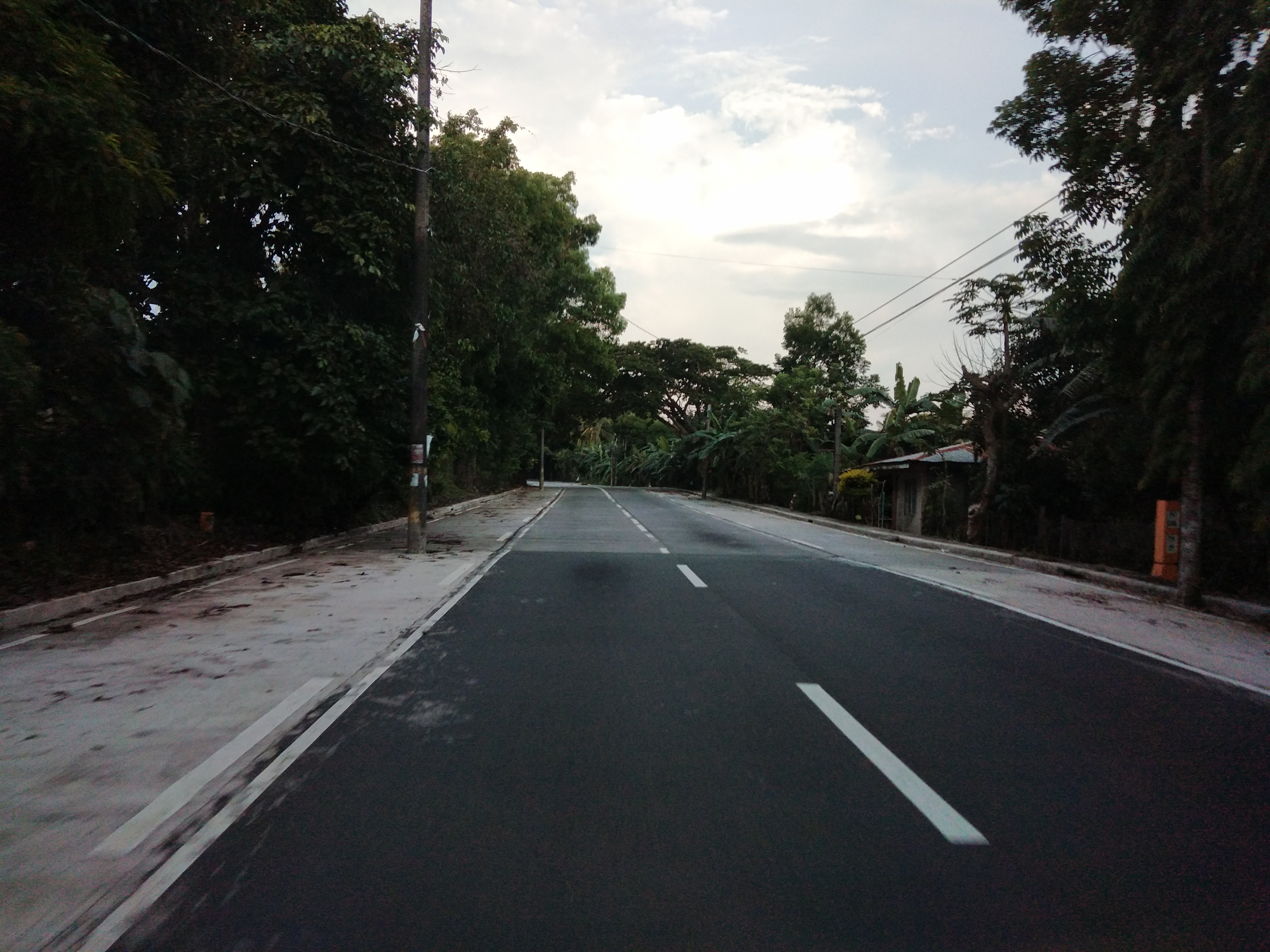
- A portion of Indang–Mendez Road, one of the component roads of N402

Route information
- Maintained by Department of Public Works and Highways (DPWH) - Cavite 1st District Engineering Office and Cavite 2nd District Engineering Office
- Length: 49.42 km (30.71 mi)

Major junctions
- North end: N64 (Antero Soriano Highway) in Tanza
- N64 (Antero Soriano Highway & Tanza–Trece Martires Road) in Tanza; N405 (Governor's Drive) in Naic; N404 (Trece Martires–Indang Road) in Indang
- South end: N410 (Tagaytay–Nasugbu Highway) in Tagaytay

Location
- Country: Philippines
- Major cities: Tagaytay
- Towns: Tanza, Naic, Indang, Mendez

Highway system
- Roads in the Philippines; Highways; Expressways; List
← N401	→ N403

National Route 402 (N402) forms part of the Philippine highway network. It runs through the rural municipalities of Cavite.

== Route description ==
N402 covers the Tanza to Tagaytay segment of Noveleta–Naic–Tagaytay Road, according to the Department of Public Works and Highways.

=== Tanza to Naic ===
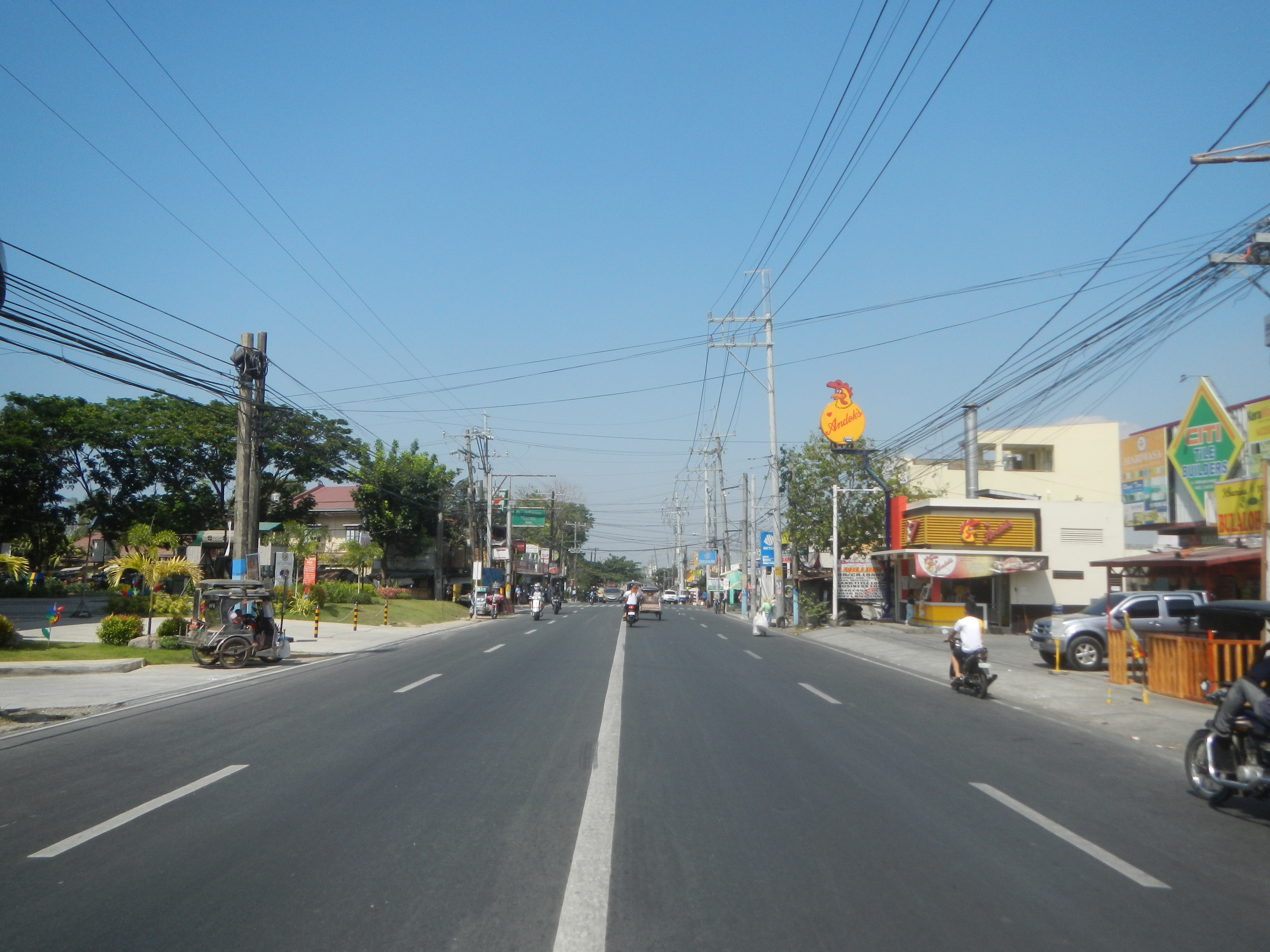
Antero Soriano Highway in Naic

N402 starts at N64 (Antero Soriano Highway) as Santa Cruz Street, a one-way street into the población of Tanza. In front of the entrance to the Diocesan Shrine of Saint Augustine, it then turns southwest as San Agustin Street, becomes a two-way street at its intersection with Santo Domingo Street. It meets the Biwas Roundabout past the Tanza Bridge, and once again meets Antero Soriano Highway at the Tanza Junction and proceeds towards Naic.

=== Naic to Indang ===
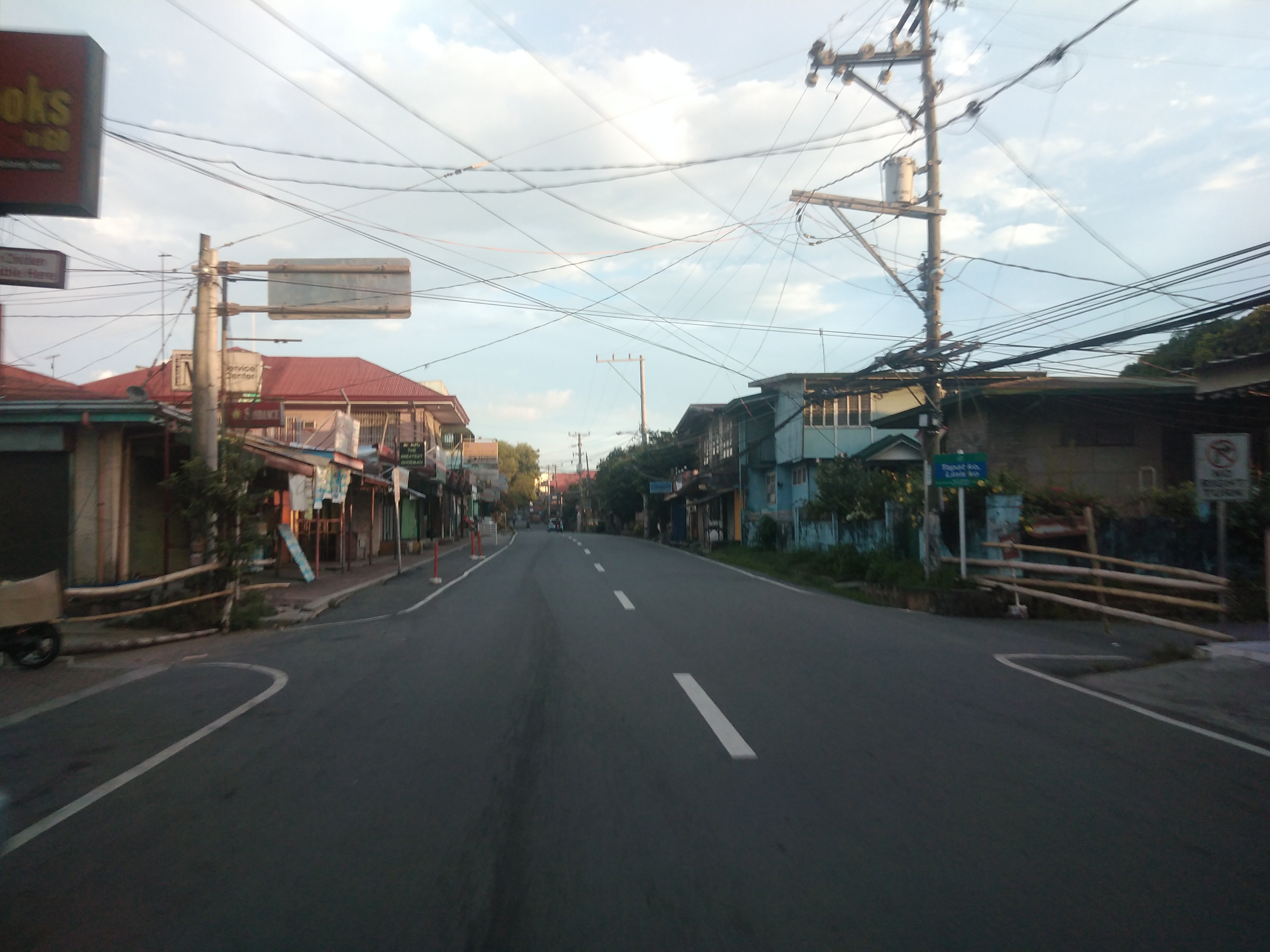
San Gregorio Street in Indang

Within the población of Naic, N402 turns southwest towards J. Poblete Street (some of its segments is also known as Sabang Road) and then, in front of the Naic Church, veers southeast as Capt. Ciriaco Nazareno Street, which is one-way southbound up to Burgos Street. Past Governor's Drive at San Roque Crossing, it proceeds towards Indang as Naic–Indang Road. It then enters the población of Indang alternatively known as A. Mojica Street and ends at De Ocampo Street. It then continues as De Ocampo Street (one-way northbound/westbound), San Miguel Street, and A. Mabini Street (where it overlaps the Indang–Alfonso via Luksuhin Road, a tertiary road), veers south in front of Indang Church as San Gregorio Street, and continues as San Gregorio Extension.

=== Indang to Mendez ===
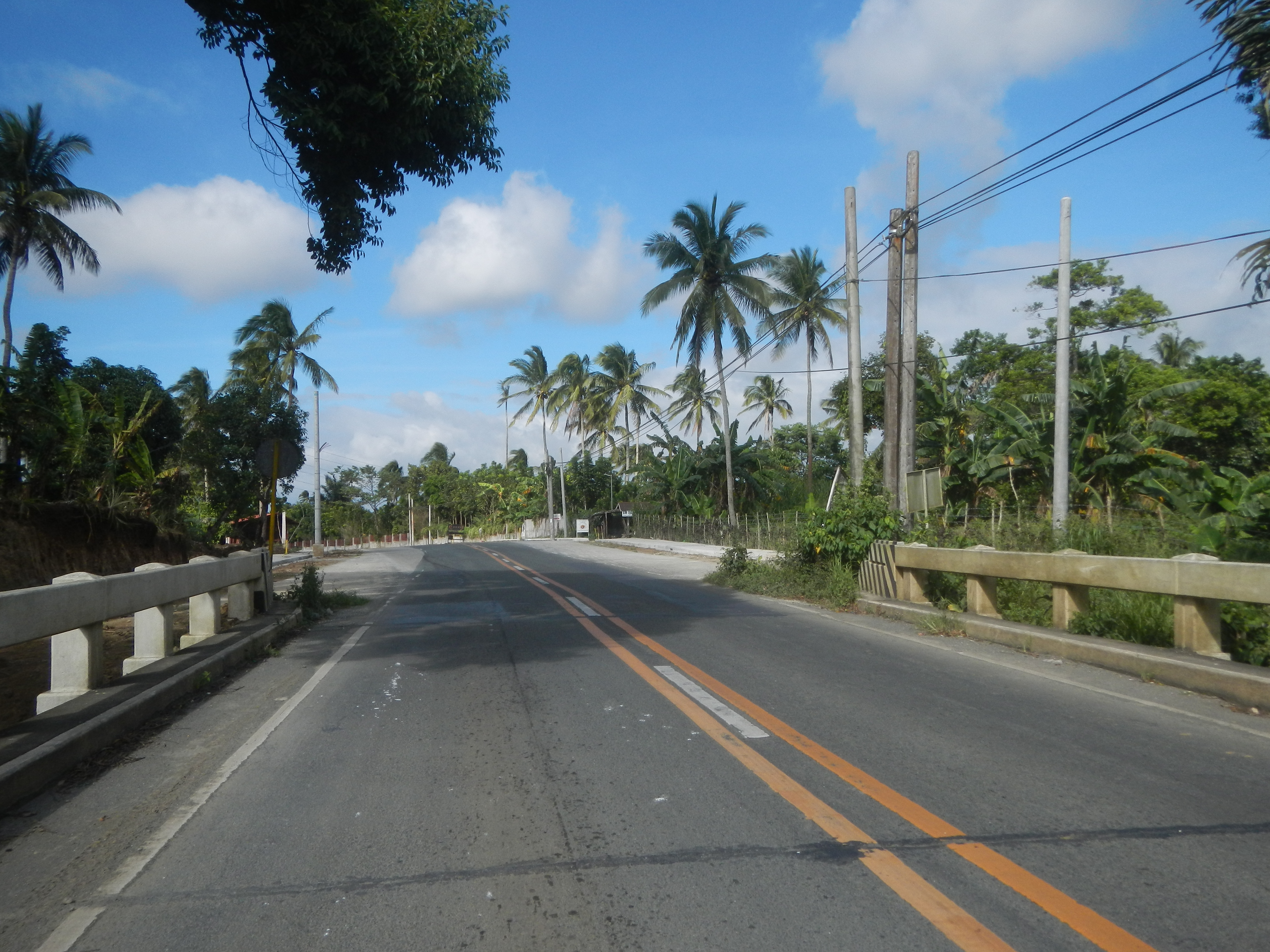
Indang–Mendez Road in Indang

At the end of San Gregorio Extension, the road intersects Trece Martires–Indang Road and proceeds southeast towards Mendez as Indang–Mendez Road (Mendez–Buna–Indang Road). It then enters the municipality of Mendez, where it becomes C. Llamado Street and Osorio Street, both one-way southbound streets, before ending at the latter's junction with J.P. Rizal Street in Mendez población.

=== Mendez to Tagaytay ===
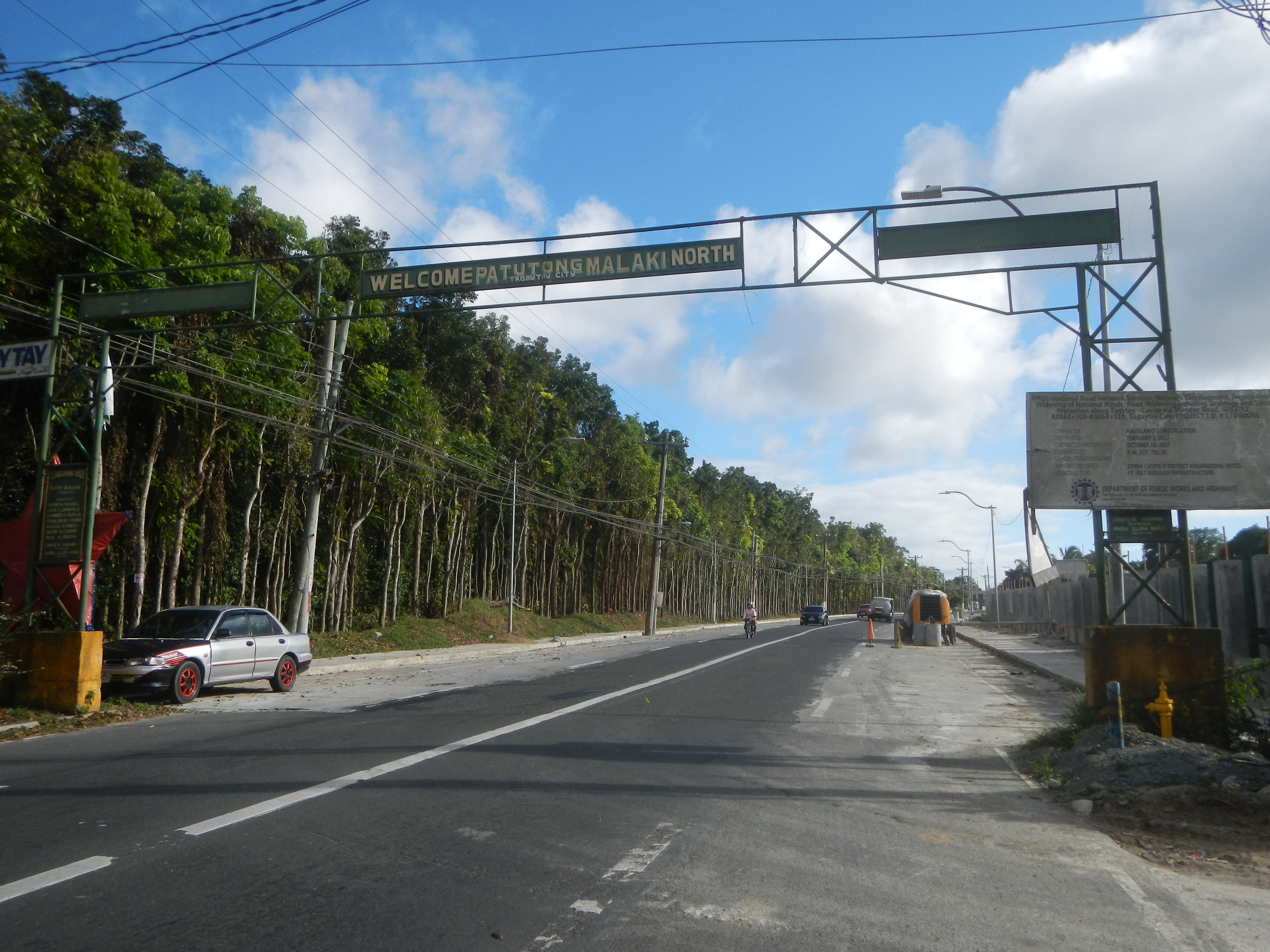
Mendez–Tagaytay Road at the Mendez–Tagaytay boundary

At the junction of J.P. Rizal and Osorio Streets, the road proceeds southeast towards Tagaytay as Mendez–Tagaytay Road. The Tagaytay segment is also known as Tagaytay–Cavite via Mendez Road. It finally terminates at Tagaytay–Nasugbu Highway at Mendez Crossing, Tagaytay.

== History ==
The direct predecessor of N402 is Highway 25, which connected Bacoor with Tagaytay via Naic especially during the 20th century.

== Intersections ==
The entire route is located in Cavite.

City/Municipality	km	mi	Destinations	Notes
Tanza			N64 (Antero Soriano Highway) – Noveleta, Manila	Northern terminus
Tanza	33.296	20.689	Tanza Bridge	
Tanza			N64 (Antero Soriano Highway & Tanza–Trece Martires Road) – Trece Martires	N402 shifts from San Agustin Street to Antero Soriano Highway
Tanza	37.286	23.168	Obispo Bridge	
Tanza	39.721	24.681	Calibuyo Bridge	
Tanza–Naic boundary	43.452	27.000	Timalan bridge. Cavite 1st District Engineering Office–Cavite 2nd District Engineering Office highway boundary.	
Naic	43.180	26.831	Bisaya Bridge	
Naic	43.395	26.964	Palanas Bridge	
Naic	46.000	28.583	Naic kilometer zero	
Naic			Antero Soriano Highway	Y-intersection towards Naic Junction. N402 shifts from Antero Soriano Highway to J. Poblete Street.
Naic			Sabang Road	Y-intersection towards Naic Junction
Naic			N405 (Governor's Drive) – Ternate	N402 shifts from Capt. C. Nazareno Street to Naic–Indang Road.
Naic	49.000	30.447	Route 402 reassurance sign.	
Naic	57.000	35.418	Route 402 reassurance sign.	
Indang			Burgos Street / Gusi Peace Prize International Avenue – Alfonso, Calumpang Cerca (Indang)	5-way junction; one-way entrance into Burgos Street, which serves as alternative route to Indang town proper and Alfonso
Indang			De Ocampo Street – Alfonso	South end of Naic–Indang Road; continues south as A. Mojica Street. De Ocampo Street is one-way westbound.
Indang			A. Mabini Street / San Miguel Street	Serves as entry point of motorists to N402 from Naic–Indang Road and Indang–Alfonso Road
Indang			R. Jeciel Street – Indang Church, Cavite State University, Trece Martires	Serves as entry point of motorists from Naic–Indang Road and Indang–Alfonso Road
Indang	65.000	40.389	Route 402 reassurance sign.	
Indang	66.000	41.010	Indang Kilometer Zero	
Indang			N402-1 (Indang–Alfonso Road) – Alfonso	
Indang			N404 (Trece Martires–Indang Road) – Trece Martires, Manila	N402 shifts from San Gregorio Extension to Indang–Mendez Road.
Mendez	73.000	45.360	Route 402 reassurance sign	
Mendez			Osorio Street / Llamado Street	One-way intersection. N402 shifts from Indang–Mendez Road to Mendez–Tagaytay Road.
Mendez	75.000	46.603	Mendez kilometer zero	
Mendez			Cavite–Tagaytay–Batangas Expressway	Future Mendez Exit of CTBEX
Tagaytay	76.321– 64.119	47.424– 39.842	Kilometer number reverses	
Tagaytay	61.690	38.332	N410 (Tagaytay–Nasugbu Highway) – Batangas	Southern terminus
1.000 mi = 1.609 km; 1.000 km = 0.621 mi: Incomplete access; Unopened
