= Antero Soriano Highway =

Road in Cavite, Philippines

R-1 Antero Soriano Highway

- Route alignment of Antero Soriano Highway

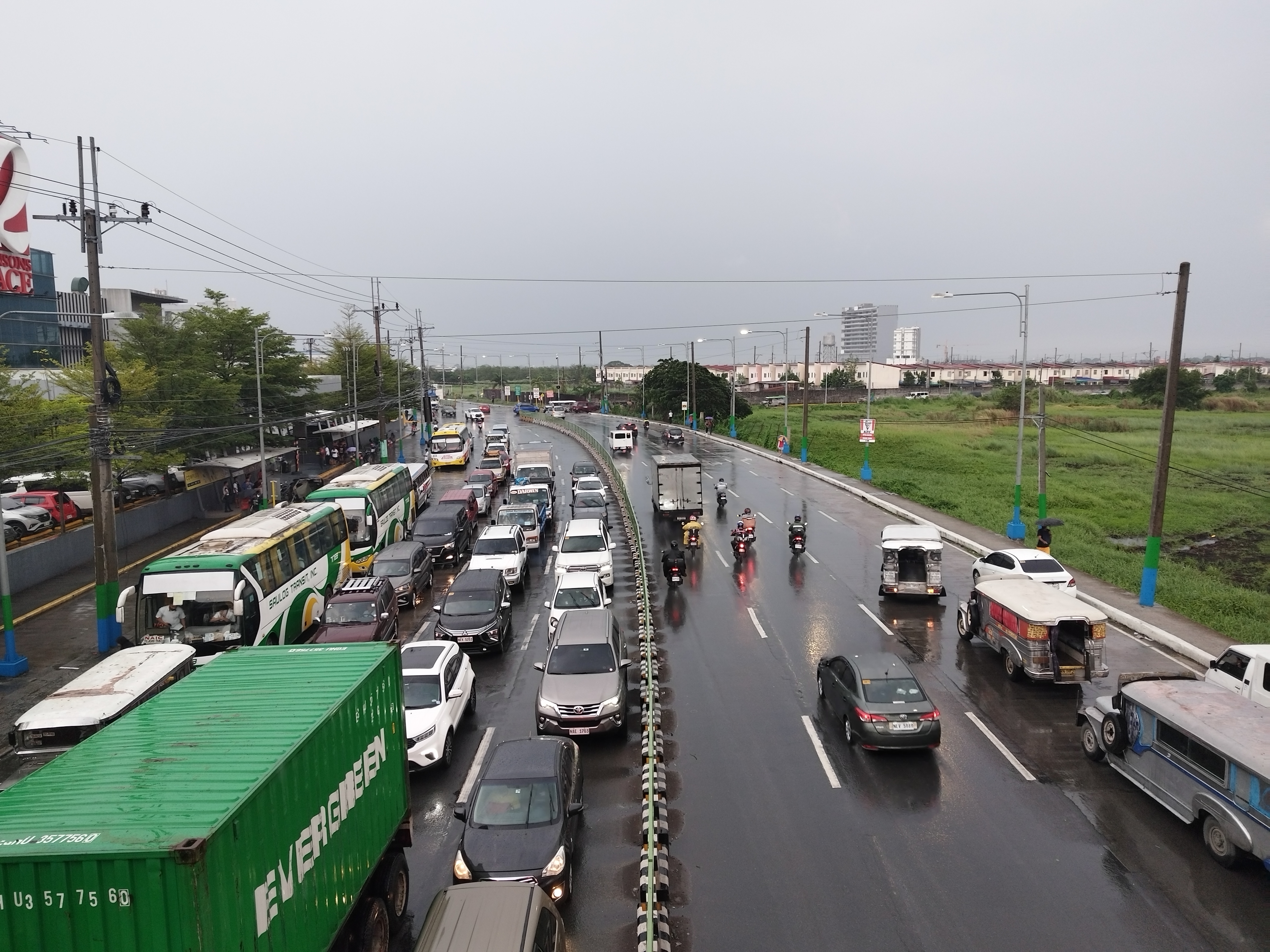
- The highway's section known as Centennial Road in General Trias, Cavite

Route information
- Maintained by Department of Public Works and Highways (DPWH) - Cavite 1st District Engineering Office and Cavite 2nd District Engineering Office
- Length: 21.6 km (13.4 mi)
- Component highways: R-1 R-1; N64 from Kawit to Tanza; N402 from Tanza to Naic

Major junctions
- North end: N62 (Tirona Highway) / Covelandia Road in Kawit
- N400 (Noveleta–Rosario Diversion Road) in Kawit and Noveleta; N401 (General Trias Drive) in Rosario; N402 (Santa Cruz Street) in Tanza; N64 (Tanza–Trece Martires Road) / N402 (San Agustin Street) in Tanza
- South end: N403 (Governor's Drive) / Sabang Road in Naic

Location
- Country: Philippines
- Provinces: Cavite
- Major cities: Imus, General Trias
- Towns: Kawit, Noveleta, Rosario, Tanza, Naic

Highway system
- Roads in the Philippines; Highways; Expressways; List

The Antero Soriano Highway, also partly known as Centennial Road, is a two-to-six lane, 21.6-kilometer (13.4 mi) highway traversing through the western coast of Cavite. It is one of the three major highways located in the province, the others are Aguinaldo Highway and Governor's Drive.

The northeastern terminus of the highway is at Kawit then travels along the cities of Imus and General Trias, municipalities of Noveleta, Rosario, Tanza and ends at the municipality of Naic.

The highway is designated as a component part of National Route 64 (N64) and National Route 402 (N402) of the Philippine highway network.

The highway was named after Antero Soriano, a native of Tanza who served as the country's senator, representative, and governor of Cavite.

== Route description ==
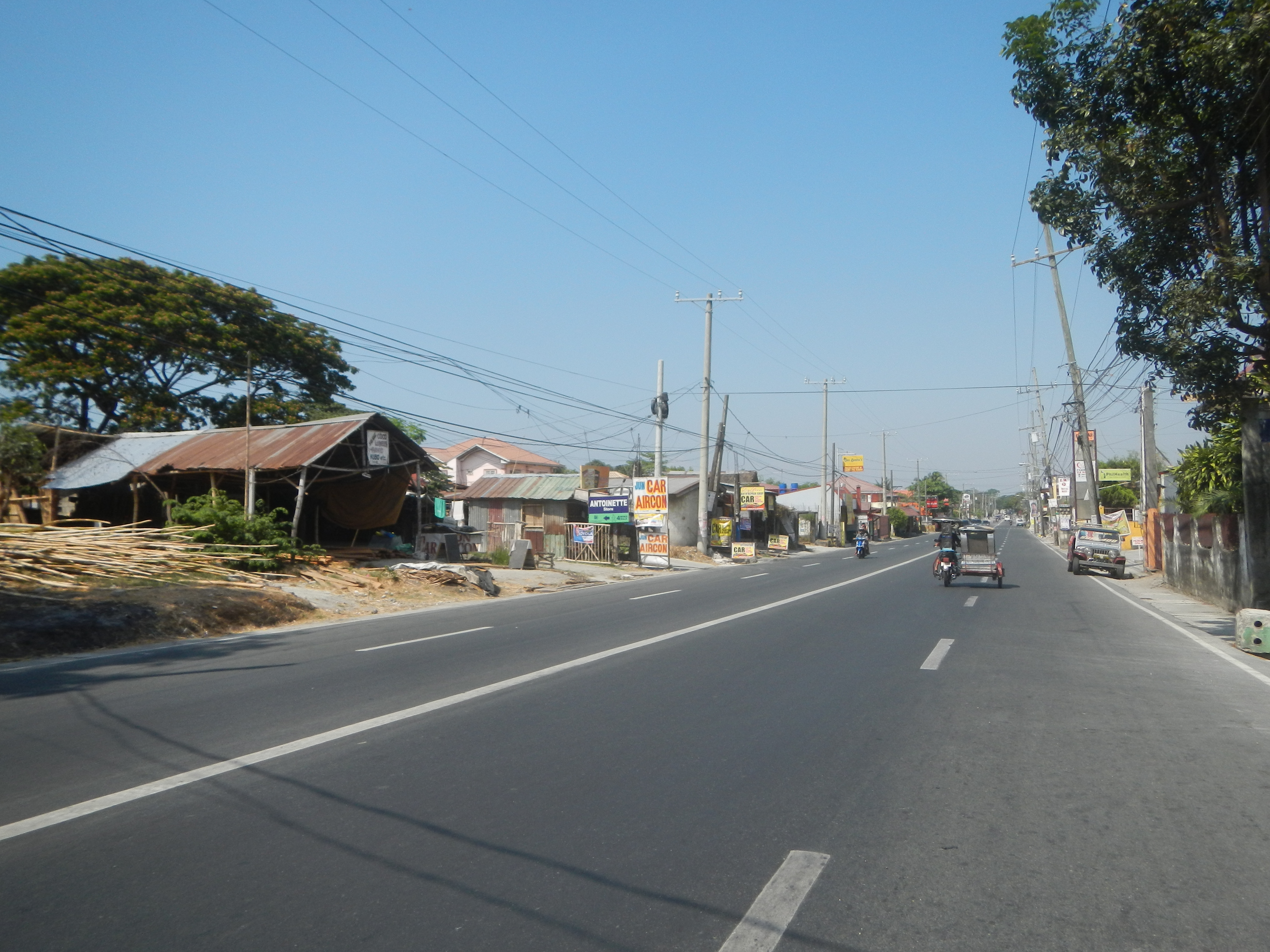
The highway's section in Naic

Antero Soriano Highway starts at the intersection with Manila–Cavite Expressway (CAVITEX), Tirona Highway, and Covelandia Road in Kawit as the logical continuation of CAVITEX. It runs to the southwest, parallel to the coast of Cavite. It enters Imus shortly after the intersection with Carsadang Bago Road and re-enters Kawit after Gahak, bypassing the poblacions of Kawit, Noveleta, Rosario, General Trias, and Tanza and the Cavite Economic Zone. At the junction with Tanza–Trece Martires Road and San Agustin Street in Tanza, the route number transitions from N64 to N402 as it approaches Naic. It enters Naic, where N402 shifts towards the poblacion, making the highway a tertiary road up to its end at the intersection with Governor's Drive and Sabang Road at Naic junction.

=== Alternative names ===
From General Trias to Kawit, the highway is also widely known as Centennial Road. A component of N64, the highway is also known as Kawit–Noveleta Diversion Road, Noveleta–Rosario Diversion Road, and Tanza Diversion Road as it bypasses the poblacions of Kawit, Rosario, Noveleta, and Tanza, respectively. Excluding the aforementioned bypass roads, it is also known as Noveleta–Naic–Tagaytay Road, the network of roads that connect Noveleta and Tagaytay. The tertiary road portion of the highway in Naic is named Juanito R. Remulla Sr. Road (also known as Governor's Drive) by the Department of Public Works and Highways.

== History ==
The present road originated from an old road that linked the municipalities of Naic and Tanza. It was part of Highway 25 that connected Bacoor with Tagaytay. In 1969, the highway was renamed in honor of Antero Soriano by virtue of Republic Act No. 5782. It was later extended to the northeast from Tanza to Kawit, with the section also known in the present-day as Centennial Road.

== Intersections ==
The entire route is located in Cavite. Intersections are numbered by kilometer post, with Rizal Park in Manila designated as kilometer 0.

City/Municipality	km	mi	Destinations	Notes
Kawit	21.335	13.257	N62 (Tirona Highway)	Northern terminus; continues north as Covelandia Road; access to E3 (Manila–Cavite Expressway) and future link to Cavite–Laguna Expressway
Kawit	24.480	15.211	Batong Dalig Bridge	
Kawit–Noveleta boundary			N622 (Noveleta–Rosario Diversion Road)	
Noveleta–General Trias boundary	27.061	16.815	General Antonio Luna Street	Half-diamond interchange/grade-separated junction. Alignment shifts after bridge
General Trias			N401 (General Trias Drive) / Governor Ferrer Drive	Kilometer number reverses.
General Trias–Tanza boundary	32.367	20.112	Tejero Bridge	
Tanza			N402 (Santa Cruz Street)	
Tanza	32.721	20.332	Biwas Bridge	
Tanza			N64 (Tanza–Trece Martires Road) / N402 (San Agustin Street)	Kilometer number reverses. Route number changes from N64 to N402 towards Naic.
Tanza	37.826	23.504	Obispo Bridge	
Tanza–Naic boundary	43.452	27.000	Timalan Bridge	
Naic			N402 (P. Poblete Street) – Naic, Indang	Route number change from N402 to unnumbered
Naic			N403 (Governor's Drive) / Sabang Road	Traffic light intersection; continues south as Governor's Drive
1.000 mi = 1.609 km; 1.000 km = 0.621 mi: Route transition

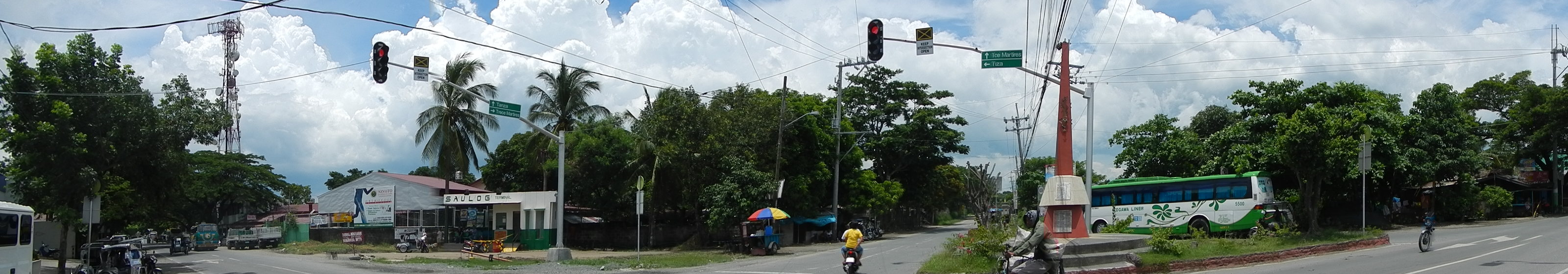
Antero Soriano Highway Intersection at Naic, Cavite panorama
