= N651 highway =

Road in the Philippines

Route 651

Route information
- Maintained by Department of Public Works and Highways

Carmona Diversion Road (Cavite)
- Length: 2.53 km (1.57 mi)
- West end: N65 (Governor's Drive / Loyola Street) in Carmona
- East end: N65 (Governor's Drive / Loyola Street) in Carmona

Panganiban–Sabloyon Road (Catanduanes)
- Length: 26.17 km (16.26 mi)
- East end: N650 (Catanduanes Circumferential Road) in Panganiban
- West end: N650 (Catanduanes Circumferential Road) in Caramoran

Location
- Country: Philippines

Highway system
- Roads in the Philippines; Highways; Expressways; List
← N650	→ N652

National Route 651 (N651) forms a part of the Philippine highway network. It is one of the national secondary roads with two non-contiguous sections, one which runs through the city of Carmona, Cavite in the Calabarzon region, while the other road runs within the island of Catanduanes in the Bicol Region.

== Route description ==
=== Cavite ===
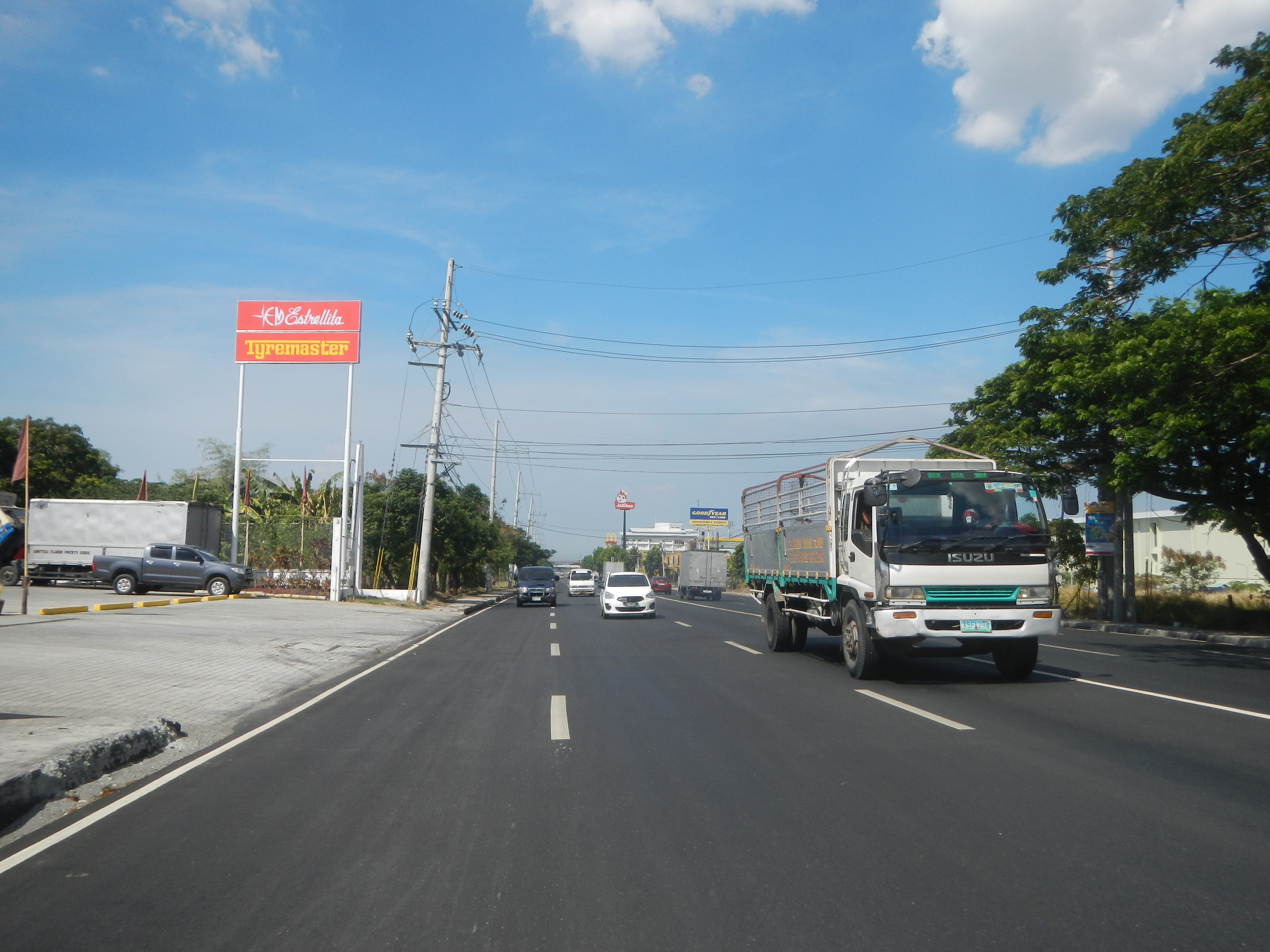
Governor's Drive (Carmona Diversion Road) in Carmona, Cavite

N651 runs through the section of Governor's Drive in the city of Carmona, Cavite, where the road is also known as Carmona Diversion Road as it bypasses the city proper. Upon reaching the Carmona Rotonda, the rest of the road going to the province of Laguna is merged by N65.

=== Catanduanes ===
In the Catanduanes province, N651 runs through the municipalities of Panganiban and Caramoran, where the entire signed road is known as Panganiban–Sabloyon Road. It connects with N650 (Catanduanes Circumferential Road) on both ends.
