= SM City Dasmariñas =

Shopping mall in Cavite, Philippines

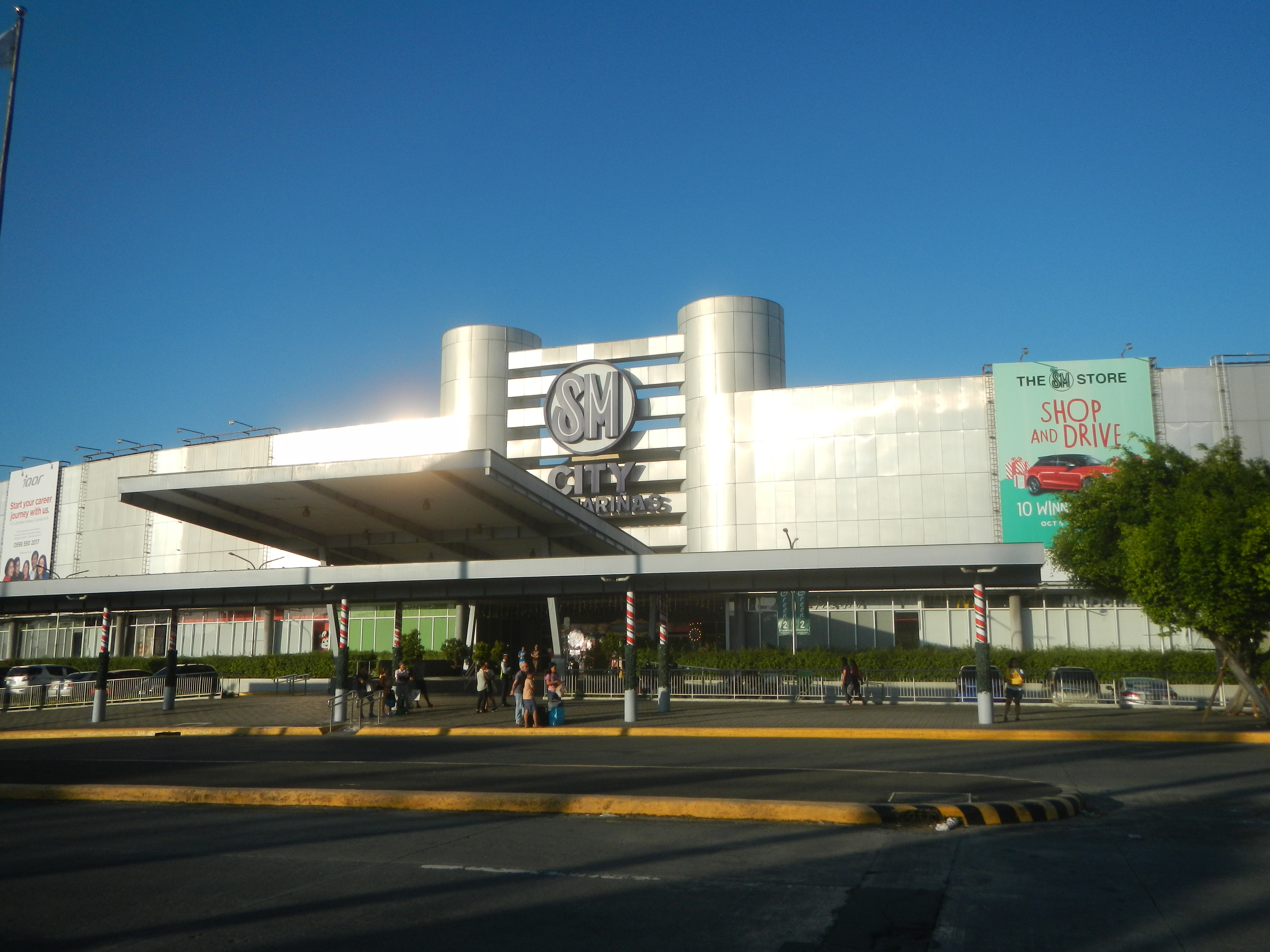
- The facade of SM City Dasmariñas
- Location: Dasmariñas, Cavite, Philippines
- Coordinates: 14°18′05″N 120°57′24″E
- Address: Governor's Drive corner Aguinaldo Highway, Sampaloc 1
- Opened: May 21, 2004; 22 years ago
- Developer: SM Prime Holdings
- Manager: SM Prime Holdings
- Architect: Jose Siao Ling & Associates
- Num. of stores: 400+
- Floor area: 201,645 m^{2} (2,170,490 sq ft)
- Floors: Main Bldg: 3; Annex Bldg: 5; Carpark Bldg: 7
- Public transit: 27 PITX/Lawton 61 Cubao
- Website: SM City Dasmariñas

SM City Dasmariñas is a large shopping mall owned by SM Prime Holdings. It is the second SM Supermall to be opened in Cavite, Philippines. It is located along kilometer 35, Governor's Drive, Sampaloc 1, Dasmariñas, Cavite. It has a land area of 12.7 hectares (31 acres) and a total gross floor area of 201,645 m^{2} (2,170,490 sq ft), making it the largest shopping mall in the province surpassing its sister mall, SM City Bacoor and currently holds the title as the 7th largest SM Supermall built by the company.

The mall averages a daily pedestrian count of 400,000 during weekends and 150,000 during weekdays, making it one of the most successful SM Supermalls built and operated by the leading mall developer.

== History and location ==
The mall complex was formerly a dense forest that was under the minister of the municipal government of Dasmariñas. SM Prime Holdings bought the estimated 12.7 hectare property in 2003. SM Prime Holdings hired Jose Siao Ling and Associates to design the mall. It is located along Governor's Drive near the intersection of Aguinaldo Highway fronting its rival mall Robinsons Place Dasmariñas and it is accessible by jeepney or bus. The mall is within the city's growing Central Business District (CBD) where the major transport terminal and several other retail establishments are located.

=== Main building ===
It is a 3-level building with a gross floor area of 94,285 m^{2} (1,014,880 sq ft). The main faćade of the mall has a thornlike structure. It was often referred by shoppers as the only SM Supermall that time that is out of the box; pointing out to its curved-edge design on its original side entrances, a feature that older SM Supermalls doesn't have. An open-air parking area is located at the back, sides, and front of the Mall. It also features the original SM brands like SM Department Store, SM Supermarket, SM Appliance Center, SM Foodcourt, SM Cinemas and other SM tenants. The Department of Foreign Affairs cavite branch also located inside the main mall building.

=== Annex building ===
The new five-level annex was constructed beside the existing building which was formerly the northwest open parking. When the annex was built, the original curved-edge entrance on the northwest wing was demolished. The annex has a total floor area of 36,486 m^{2} (392,730 sq ft) and features some high-end shops and dining establishments. The entire 3rd level is devoted entirely for Cyberzone. The 4th and 5th levels are for BPO offices. The annex was opened on December 12, 2011.

== Expansion and renovation ==
The primary feature of SM City Dasmariñas’ expansion and renovation is the five-level new structure that has risen at the northwest end of the existing mall. It has a gross floor area of 36,486 m^{2} (392,730 sq ft) that offers not only three levels of retail spaces, but also two levels of space for BPO offices. The new annex was opened on December 12, 2011.

Apart from the newly opened Annex, the Foodcourt at the lower ground floor in the main building was renovated. The cinemas were also upgraded, from lighting fixtures to new furnitures that was installed and an additional two (2) cinemas constructed making the total cinema screens to six (6). Additional parking spaces are up for completion at the northwest wing and southeast wing of the mall complex. Completing the expansion of Cavite's premiere mall is the 7-level carpark building that has risen at the back portion of the existing buildings. Insides the 7-level carpark building is the National University Dasmariñas located in the 6th and 7th floor of the building. Additional stores and restaurants were added into the lower and upper ground floors of the carpark building.

Two Director's Club cinemas opened on September 3, 2025, at the former Cinema 4.

== The Annex ==
The Annex was opened on December 12, 2011, a 5-storey building that boasts of over 36,486 square meters of floor space. It has the biggest gross leasable area and the first ever mall expansion project in the south Luzon region.

The Annex features a generous entrance plaza: high curtain glass has been installed to enable to see the mall's activity inside. A fan-like machine had been installed at the ceiling. Furthermore, it features more than 100 shops.

The Annex is divided into five floors. The first 2 upper floors are devoted for BPO offices. New York-based business process outsourcing iQor occupied the entire 4th and 5th floors. The entire 3rd floor of the annex building (2nd Floor) is the Cyberzone area. The 2nd and 1st floors of the annex building (Upper Ground Floor and Lower Ground Floor) houses a wide range of more upscale retail shops and several restaurants.

== Incidents ==
=== September 2010 robbery ===
On September 6, 2010, two guards and one saleslady were injured as five armed men robbed the mall's BDO branch and a Musical Instrument Shop. After the incident, the mall was closed. The mall and the bank resumed its normal operation the following day.

=== October 2016 hostage taking ===
On October 9, 2016, a hostage taking crisis incident occurred at around 11:00 AM with two killed, along with the suspect and three wounded. The suspect who was looking for his wife who was working as a janitor, with the suspect not looking for his wife, the suspect began to attack mall customers using a knife. The suspect began to hostage at least eleven customers, with the eight escaped while the three were left with the suspect. By 2:00 PM, the suspect stabbed two hostages. The incident ended at around 2:55 p.m. after the police decided to shoot the suspect who succumbed to gunshot wounds to the head and neck. After the incident, the management closed all the stores for the safety of the customers.

Preceded by SM City Marilao	18th SM Supermall; 2004	Succeeded by SM City Batangas
