= N65 highway =

Road in the Philippines

Route 65

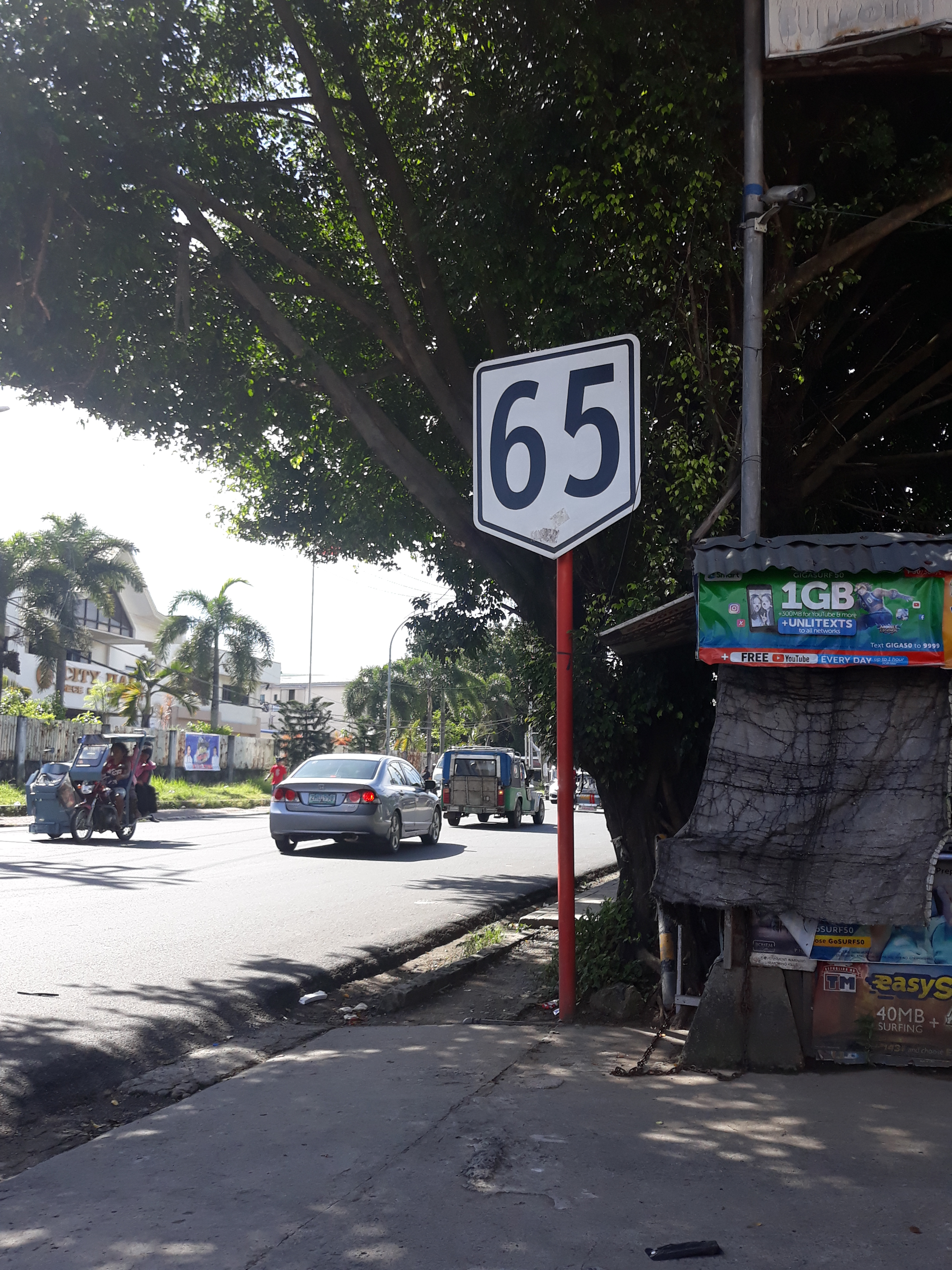
- Route reassurance sign in Trece Martires, Cavite

Route information
- Maintained by the Department of Public Works and Highways
- Length: 27.311 km (16.970 mi)

Major junctions
- West end: N64 (Tanza–Trece Martires Road) / N403 (Governor's Drive) / N404 (Trece Martires–Indang Road) in Trece Martires
- N410 (Aguinaldo Highway) in Dasmariñas; N651 (Carmona Diversion Road) in Carmona; AH26 (South Luzon Expressway) in Carmona
- East end: N1 (Manila South Road) in Biñan

Location
- Country: Philippines
- Provinces: Cavite and Laguna
- Major cities: Trece Martires, General Trias, Dasmariñas, Carmona, and Biñan
- Towns: General Mariano Alvarez and Silang

Highway system
- Roads in the Philippines; Highways; Expressways; List
← N64	→ N66

National Route 65 (N65) forms part of the Philippine highway network. It runs through central Cavite and northern Laguna.

== Route description ==
=== Trece Martires to Dasmariñas ===
N65 forms the physical continuation of N403, known as Governor's Drive, from Naic. It starts at the junction with N64 (Tanza–Trece Martires Road) and N404 (Trece Martires–Indang Road) in Trece Martires, Cavite. It then traverses General Trias, where it crosses Crisanto M. de los Reyes Avenue in barangay Manggahan and Arnaldo Highway in barangay San Francisco, before entering Dasmariñas.

=== Dasmariñas to Carmona ===
N65 continues as Governor's Drive as it traverses Dasmariñas, where it intersects with N410 (Aguinaldo Highway), the boundary of General Mariano Alvarez and Silang, and Carmona.

In Dasmariñas, N65 also branches from Governor's Drive to Aguinaldo Highway as Pala-pala Road, diverting motorists from the junction of the two aforementioned highways.

=== Carmona to Biñan ===
In Carmona, N65 turns into the town proper as Loyola Street, while N651 diverts Governor's Drive away from the city proper. N65 then returns to Governor's Drive at the Carmona Rotonda before crossing over E2/AH26 (South Luzon Expressway), which is accessible via Carmona Exit. Past the Carmona Bridge at the provincial boundary of Cavite and Laguna, N65 continues as General Malvar Street (officially known as Biñan–Cavite Road) and ends at N1 (Manila South Road) in Biñan; the street continues as an unnumbered route into the old Biñan town proper.
