= Governor's Drive =

Major highway in Cavite, Philippines

Juanito R. Remulla Sr. Road
- Juanito Remulla Sr. Avenue; Juanito Remulla Sr. Drive; Governor's Drive
- Governor's Drive highlighted in red

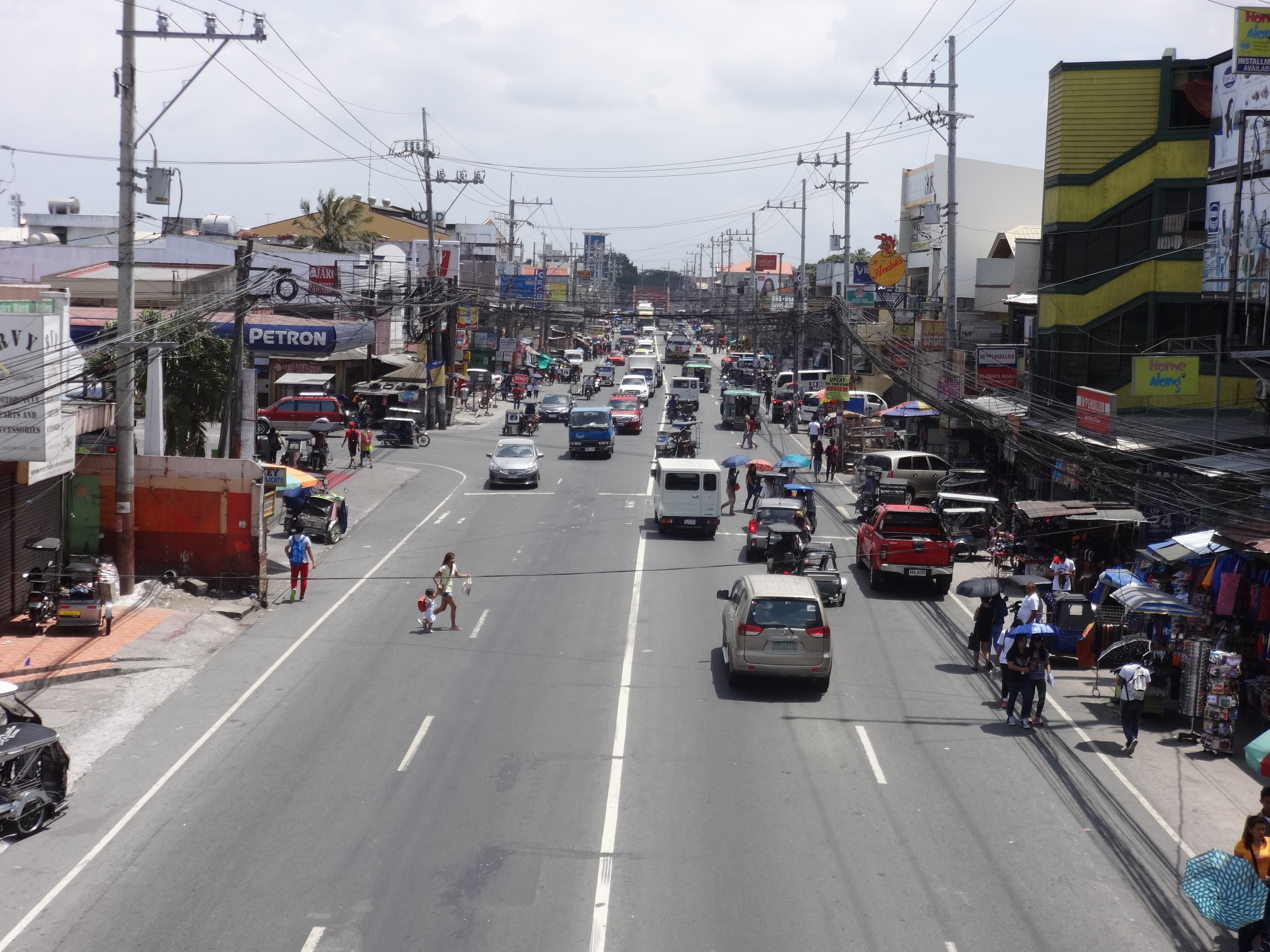
- Governor's Drive between General Mariano Alvarez and Silang

Route information
- Maintained by the Department of Public Works and Highways (DPWH) – Cavite 1st District Engineering Office, Cavite 2nd District Engineering Office, and Cavite Sub-District Engineering Office
- Length: 58.3 km (36.2 mi)
- Existed: 1970s–present
- Component highways: N65 from Carmona to Trece Martires; N651 in Carmona; N403 from Trece Martires to Naic; Unnumbered (tertiary) in Naic; N405 from Naic to Ternate

Major junctions
- East end: Carmona Bridge on the Carmona–Biñan boundary
- N65 (Loyola Street) in Carmona; N65 (Pala-Pala Road) in Dasmariñas; N419 (Aguinaldo Highway) in Dasmariñas; N64 (Tanza–Trece Martires Road) / N404 (Trece Martires–Indang Road) in Trece Martires; N402 (Naic–Indang Road) in Naic, Cavite
- West end: N405 (Caylabne Road) / N407 (Ternate–Nasugbu Road) in Ternate, Cavite

Location
- Country: Philippines
- Provinces: Cavite
- Major cities: Carmona, Dasmariñas, General Trias, Trece Martires
- Towns: General Mariano Alvarez, Silang, Tanza, Naic, Maragondon, Ternate

Highway system
- Roads in the Philippines; Highways; Expressways; List

The Juanito R. Remulla Sr. Road, (Note: Alternately Juanito R. Remulla Sr. Avenue in areas where there is a center island in it, especially in Dasmariñas.) formerly and still commonly referred to as Governor's Drive, is a two-to-nine lane, 58.3-kilometer (36.2 mi) network of primary, secondary and tertiary highways and bridges traversing through the central cities and municipalities of the province of Cavite, Philippines. It is the widest among the three major highways located in the province, the others being the Aguinaldo and Antero Soriano Highways.

The road forms part of National Route 65 (N65), National Route 651 (N651), National Route 403 (N403), and National Route 405 (N405) of the Philippine highway network. A part of the road between the N403 and N405 section is a tertiary road and is unnumbered.

== Route description ==
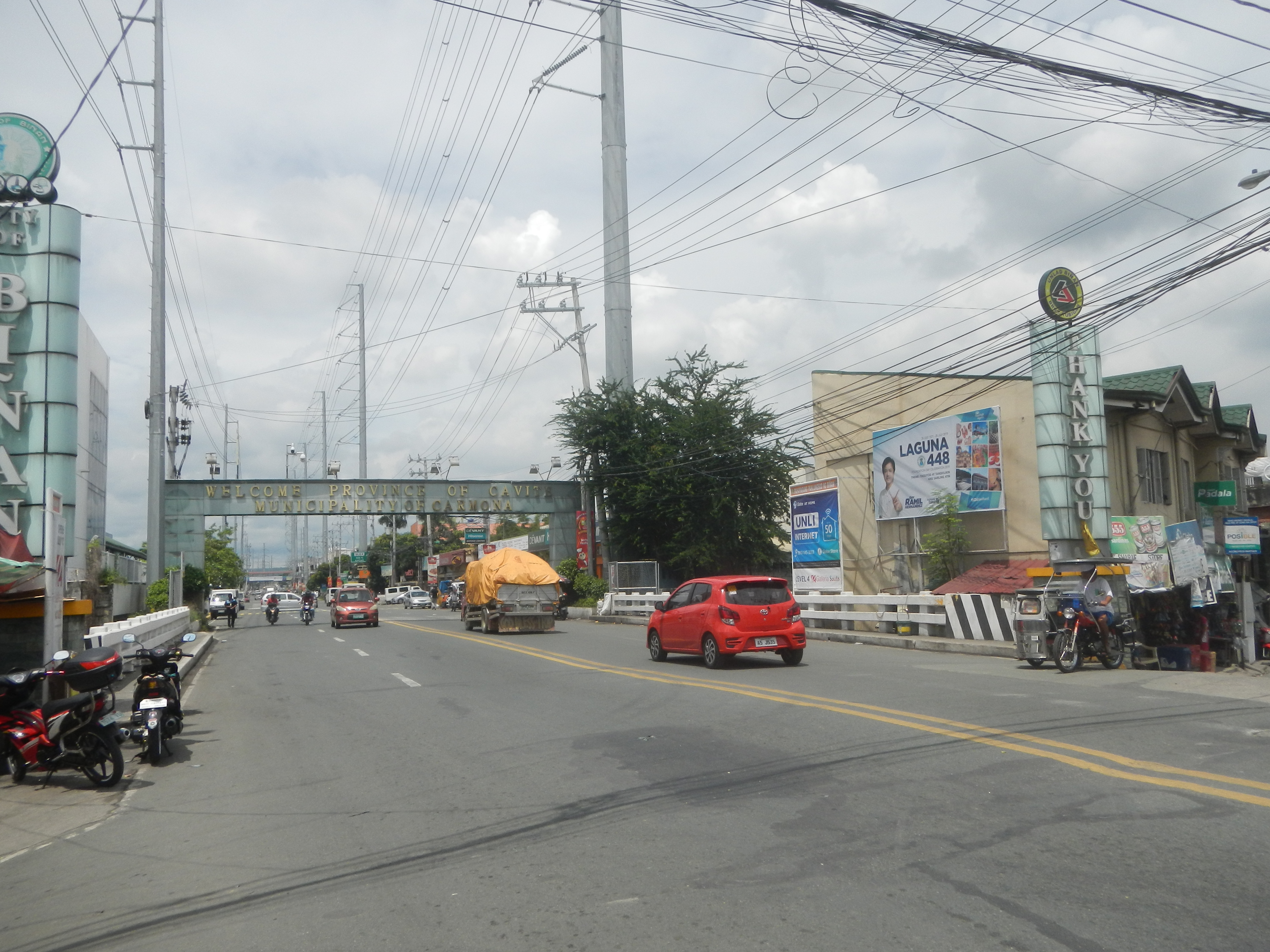
Eastern terminus of Governor's Drive at the Carmona–Biñan (Cavite–Laguna) boundary

The eastern terminus of the highway is at the Carmona Bridge at the Carmona–Biñan boundary. It traverses Carmona, General Mariano Alvarez, Silang, Dasmariñas, General Trias, Trece Martires, Tanza, Naic, Maragondon, and Ternate.

The highway is mostly concrete paved, while some other parts are currently being rehabilitated and being overlaid with asphalt.

=== Dasmariñas to Carmona ===
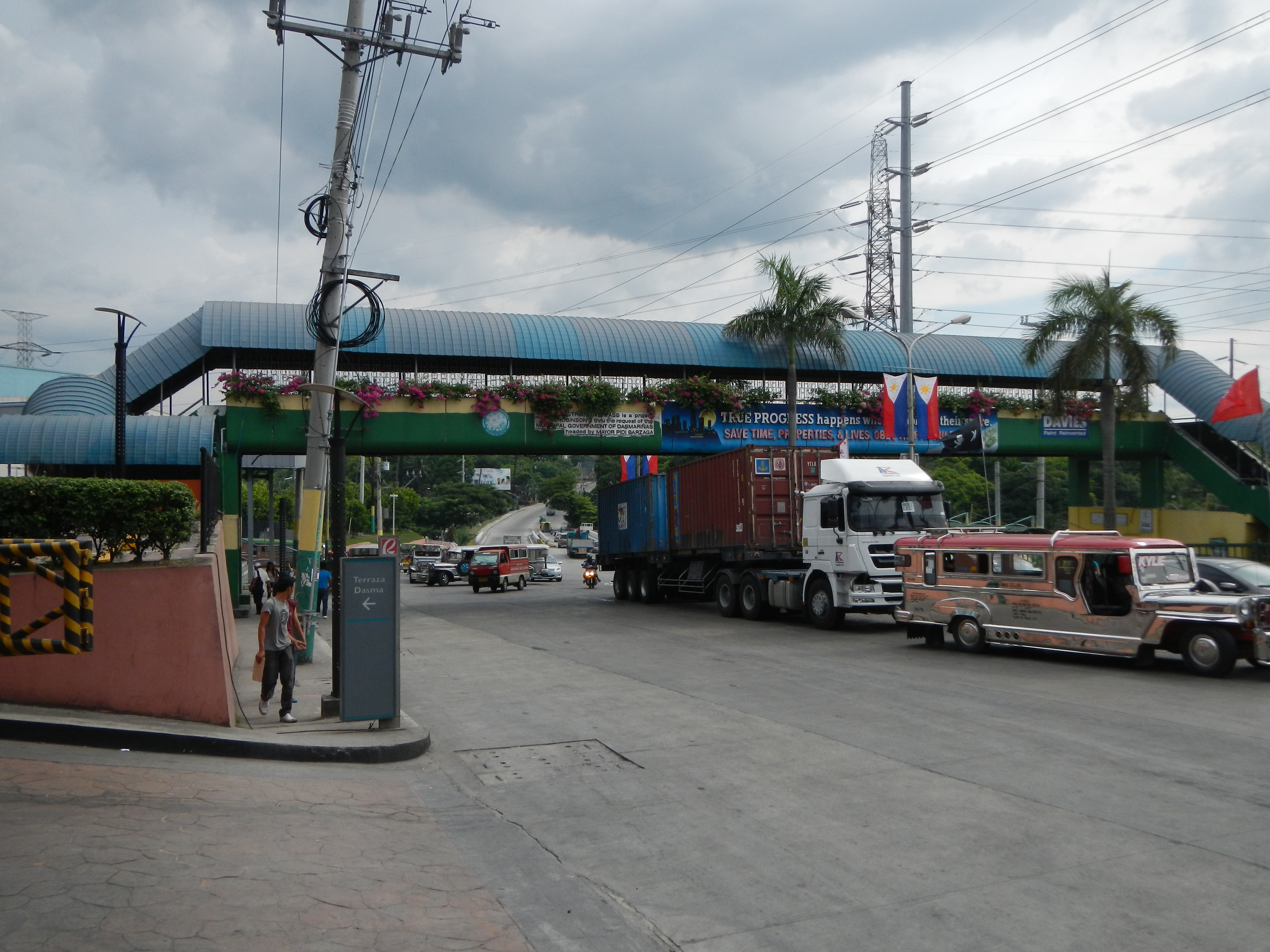
Governor's Drive in Dasmariñas

Governor's Drive towards the provincial boundary with Laguna starts near SM City Dasmariñas at the Pala-pala intersection with Aguinaldo Highway. It then winds eastward, as it nears Manila Memorial Park, just on the side of the highway. It intersects Paliparan Road and then enters General Mariano Alvarez through a bridge on the Dasmariñas–GMA boundary. It passes through GMA's town center and its boundary with Silang before curving northeast at the GMA–Carmona boundary. At Carmona, it mostly runs through the town's industrial areas and bypasses the town proper on the north as the segment that is officially known as Carmona Diversion Road. It soon crosses the South Luzon Expressway and enters Biñan, where it continues as General Malvar Street.

=== Dasmariñas to Trece Martires ===
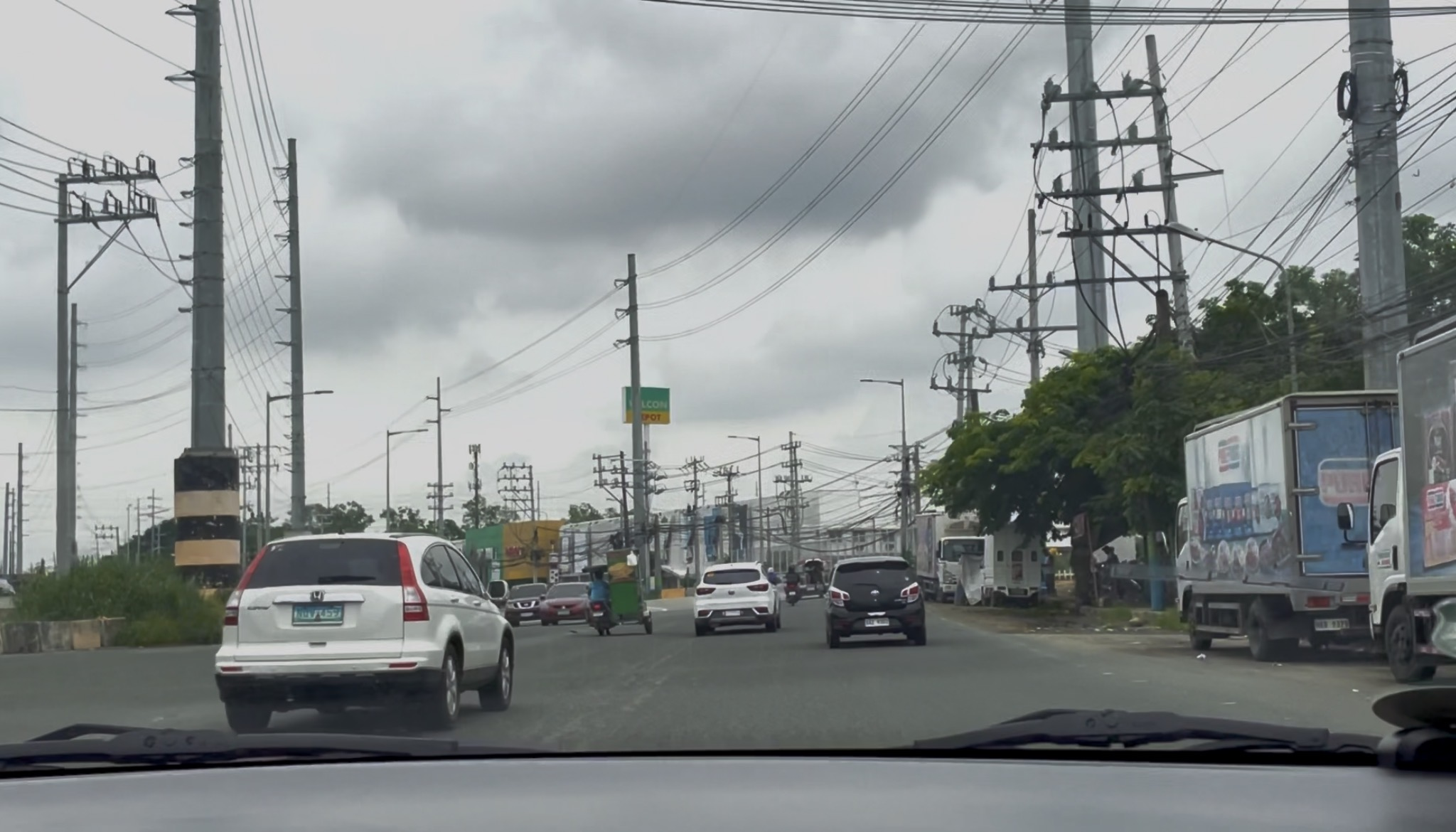
Governor's Drive in General Trias approaching the interchange with Cavite-Laguna Expressway.

Governor's Drive toward Trece Martires starts also at the intersection with Aguinaldo Highway at Pala-Pala, near Robinsons Place Dasmariñas. It is mostly a 6-lane highway when it runs westward towards General Trias. The highway passes through the western barangays of Dasmariñas, and then enters General Trias. It soon intersects the Cavite-Laguna Expressway with an interchange and Arnaldo Highway near the San Miguel and Purefoods-Hormel factories. The highway soon crosses Crisanto Mendoza de los Reyes Avenue diagonally at Manggahan. Then, it enters Trece Martires at Pulunan Bridge. Afterwards, it becomes shortly one-way forming a roundabout with Trece Martires–Indang Road and Thirteen Martyrs Avenue around the city hall and other buildings in the Trece Martires City Proper and continues toward Tanza and Naic.

=== Trece Martires to Ternate ===
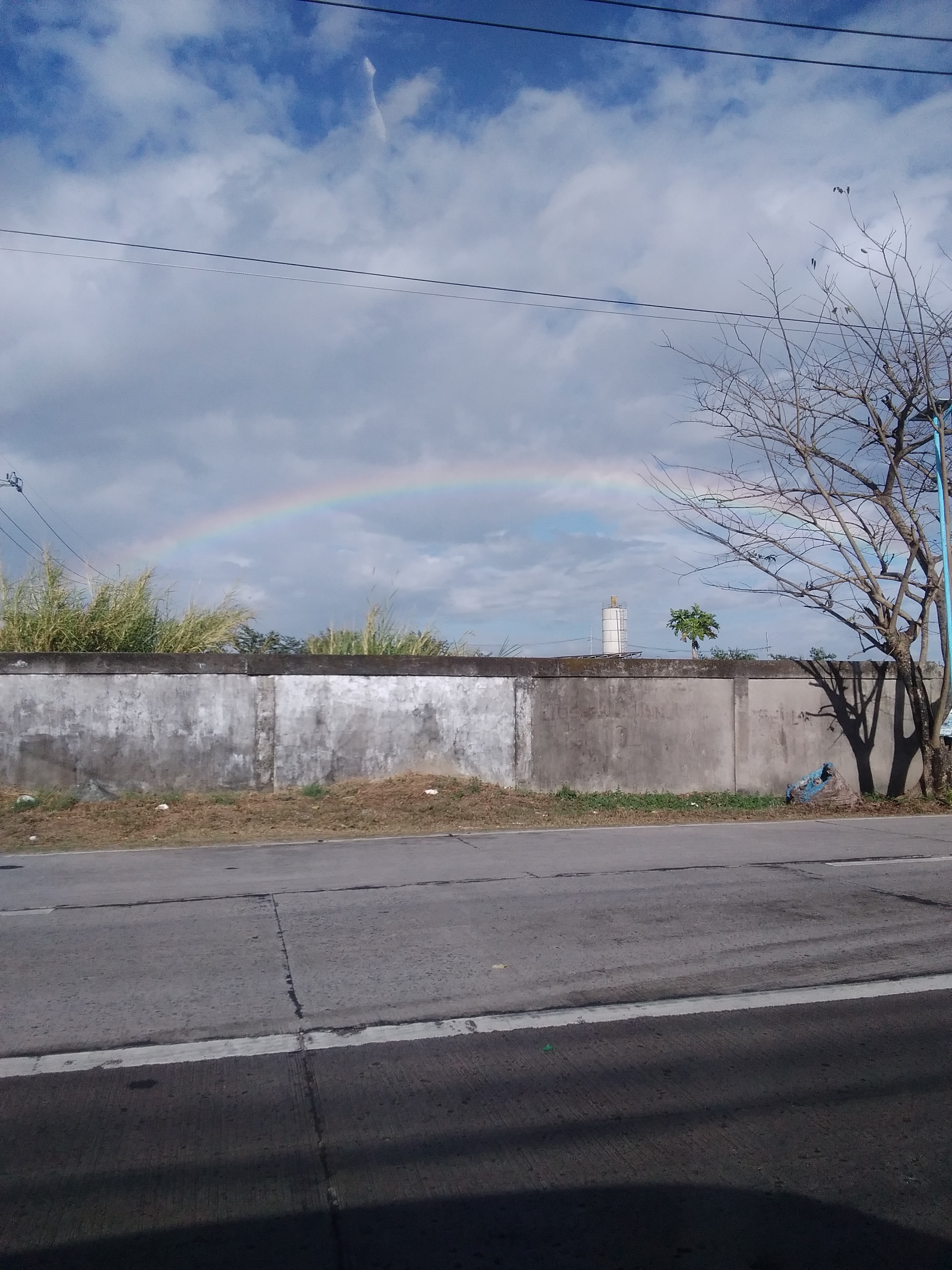
Naic segment of Governor's Drive in 2022

After passing the Trece Martires City Proper, Governor's Drive continues westward on a slightly winding route through the eastern segment of Trece Martires before veering north in Cabuco. It soon passes Tanza before entering Naic. Then turns left toward Maragondon, where it turns away from the municipal proper. It enters Ternate, where it veers southwest towards the bridge carrying it over the Maragondon River. It then climbs the Mounts Palay-Palay–Mataas-na-Gulod Protected Landscape and ends at its intersection with Caylabne Road. The highway continues towards Nasugbu, Batangas as the Ternate–Nasugbu Road.

== History ==
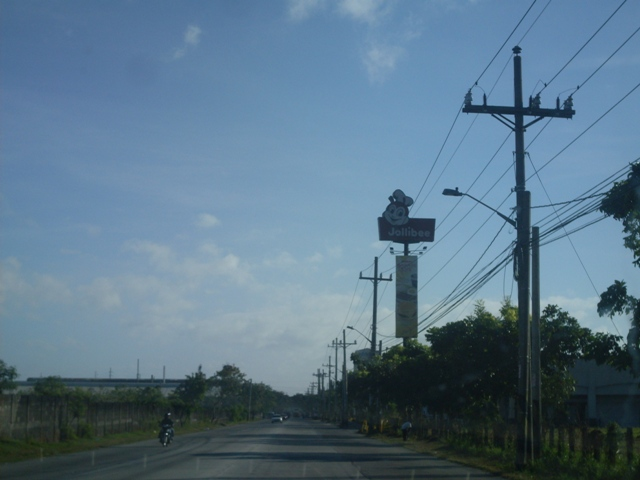
Carmona segment of Governor's Drive in 2008

The origin of the highway could be traced back to three separate roads: Dasmariñas-Carmona-Biñang Road from Dasmariñas to Carmona, Naic-Quintana-Junction Dasmariñas-Silang from Naic to Dasmariñas, and an old provincial road linking the municipal centers of Naic, Maragondon, and Ternate. The first two were classified as secondary roads in the 1950s. The provincial road's segment from Naic to Maragondon was designated as Route 301, while its segment from Maragondon to Ternate was designated as Route 332. Additional sections were later added to form the present-day Governor's Drive.

By virtue of Republic Act No. 11047, enacted on June 29, 2018, the entire highway was renamed as Governor Juanito R. Remulla Sr. Road, after the former governor of Cavite.

== Intersections ==
Intersections are numbered by kilometer posts, with Rizal Park in Manila designated as kilometer zero. The kilometer count is discontinuous.

Province	City/Municipality	km	mi	Destinations	Notes
Cavite–Laguna boundary	Carmona–Biñan boundary	50.341– 35.693	31.280– 22.179	Carmona Bridge over Carmona River. Cavite Sub-District Engineering Office–Laguna 2nd District Engineering Office highway boundary. Kilometer number reverses.	
Cavite	Carmona	48.285	30.003	AH26 (South Luzon Expressway) – Manila, Legazpi	Biñan - Carmona Overpass over South Luzon Expressway
Cavite	Carmona	48.723	30.275	N65 (J. M. Loyola Street), Market Road	Roundabout. Route number change from N651 to N65.
Cavite	Carmona	47.000	29.204	Route 651 reassurance sign	
Cavite	Carmona			Congressional Road	Traffic light intersection.
Cavite	Carmona	46.296	28.767	N65 (J. M. Loyola Street)	Y-intersection. Route number change from N65 to N651.
Cavite	Carmona	43.000	26.719	Route 65 reassurance sign	
Cavite	Carmona			General Mariano Alvarez–Silang Road – Silang	Traffic light intersection.
Cavite	General Mariano Alvarez–Carmona–Silang boundary	40.563	25.205	Bancal Bridge	
Cavite	General Mariano Alvarez–Silang boundary			Congressional Road – General Mariano Alvarez	
Cavite	General Mariano Alvarez–Dasmariñas–Silang boundary	39.508	24.549	Embarkadero Bridge	
Cavite	Dasmariñas			Paliparan Road	
Cavite	Dasmariñas	37.995	23.609	Piela Bridge	
Cavite	Dasmariñas	36.984	22.981	Aguinaldo Bridge	
Cavite	Dasmariñas			UTS Boulevard	Traffic light intersection.
Cavite	Dasmariñas	35.640	22.146	San Marcelino Bridge	
Cavite	Dasmariñas	35.170	21.854	Paredes Bridge	
Cavite	Dasmariñas			N65 (Pala-Pala Road)	
Cavite	Dasmariñas			Palapala Diversion Bridge	
Cavite	Dasmariñas	34.408	21.380	N419 (Aguinaldo Highway) – Bacoor, Tagaytay	Kilometer number reverses.
Cavite	Dasmariñas	34.493	21.433	Bucal Bridge	
Cavite	Dasmariñas	35.127	21.827	Langkaan Bridge I	
Cavite	Dasmariñas	36.000	22.369	Route 65 reassurance sign.	
Cavite	Dasmariñas	36.071	22.413	Langkaan Bridge II	
Cavite	Dasmariñas	36.574	22.726	Langkaan Bridge III	
Cavite	Dasmariñas–General Trias boundary	37.239	23.139	Alang-Ilang Bridge over Ylang-Ylang River. Cavite Sub District Engineering Office–Cavite 1st District Engineering Office highway boundary.	
Cavite	General Trias			E3 (Cavite–Laguna Expressway)	Interchange Bridge 3 over Cavite–Laguna Expressway
Cavite	General Trias			Arnaldo Highway	
Cavite	General Trias	38.278	23.785	Malabon Bridge	
Cavite	General Trias			Crisanto Mendoza de los Reyes Avenue, Governor Ferrer Drive – Amadeo	Traffic light intersection.
Cavite	General Trias	39.740	24.693	Manggahan Bridge over Matangilan River	
Cavite	General Trias–Trece Martires boundary	40.873	25.397	Panaysayan Bridge over Panaysayan River	
Cavite	Trece Martires	41.232	25.620	Pasong Elo Bridge	
Cavite	Trece Martires	42.118	26.171	Patda Bridge	
Cavite	Trece Martires	42.831	26.614	Pulunan Steel Bridge [sic]	
Cavite	Trece Martires	43.740	27.179	Mag-Asawang Layon Bridge	
Cavite	Trece Martires	44.000	27.340	Route 65 reassurance sign. Trece Martires kilometer zero.	
Cavite	Trece Martires	44.320	27.539	N64 (Tanza–Trece Martires Road) / N404 (Trece Martires–Indang Road) – Tanza, Indang	Forms a traffic loop around the City Hall due to the one way traffic scheme implemented by the city since October 2025. Route number changes from N65 to N403.
Cavite	Trece Martires	45.000	27.962	Route 403 reassurance sign.	
Cavite	Trece Martires	45.647	28.364	Puting Tubig Bridge	
Cavite	Trece Martires	46.047	28.612	Pasong Balite Bridge	
Cavite	Trece Martires	47.016	29.214	Vaquero Bridge	
Cavite	Tanza			No major intersections.	
Cavite	Tanza–Naic boundary	44.301	27.527	Cavite 1st District Engineering Office–Cavite 2nd District Engineering Office highway boundary.	
Cavite	Naic	45.947	28.550	Antero Soriano Highway / Sabang Road – Tanza, Kawit	Change to unnumbered highway. Kilometre number reverses.
Cavite	Naic	46.562	28.932	Naic Diversion Bridge	
Cavite	Naic	48.214	29.959	N402 (Naic–Indang Road) – Indang	Change to numbered highway, N405. Traffic light intersection.
Cavite	Naic	48.252	29.982	Convento Bridge	
Cavite	Maragondon	53.464	33.221	N406 (Maragondon–Magallanes–Amuyong Road) – Maragondon, Magallanes	
Cavite	Ternate	56.157	34.894	Maragondon Bridge over Maragondon River	
Cavite	Ternate	57.782	35.904	Sapang Bridge over Gapan River	
Cavite	Ternate	67.075	41.678	N405 (Caylabne Road) / N407 (Ternate–Nasugbu Road) – Caylabne Bay, Nasugbu	
1.000 mi = 1.609 km; 1.000 km = 0.621 mi: Closed/former; Route transition; Unopened

== Landmarks ==
SM City Dasmariñas on Governor's Drive

The Governor's Drive is also home to many known places and landmarks. Such malls like SM City Dasmariñas, SM City Trece Martires, Robinsons Place Dasmariñas, Walter Mart General Trias, Walter Mart Trece Martires, Walter Mart Naic, and Walter Mart Carmona are located along the highway. Many industrial estates and factory plants are also located here such as the Golden Mile Business Park, People's Technology Complex, Mountview Industrial Complex, Grandville Industrial Complex, Dasmariñas Technopark, Monterey Meat Plant, the First Cavite Industrial Estate, Purefoods-Hormel Plant, Magnolia Plant, Sugarland Estates, Eagle Ridge Golf Course and the Royal Tern Ceramics Philippines. Memorial Parks like the Manila Memorial Park - Dasmariñas is located along the road.
