= N403 highway =

Road in the Philippines

Route 403
- Governor's Drive; Trece Martires–Naic Road; Dasmariñas–Trece Martires City–Naic Road
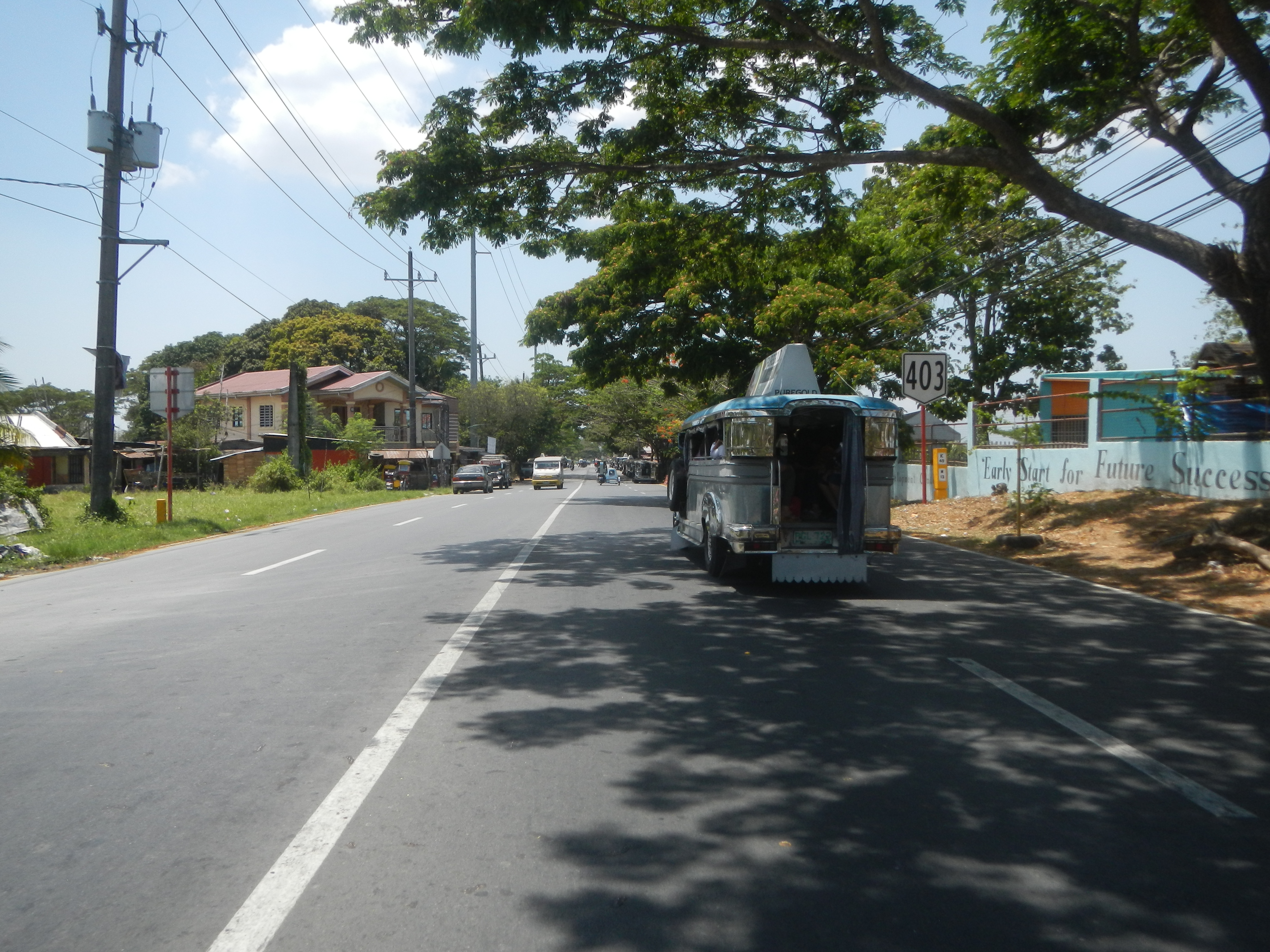
- N403 and its reasurrance sign in Trece Martires

Route information
- Maintained by Department of Public Works and Highways (DPWH) - Cavite 1st District Engineering Office & Cavite 2nd District Engineering Office
- Length: 12.55 km (7.80 mi)

Major junctions
- East end: N64 (Tanza–Trece Martires Road) / N65 (Governor's Drive) / N404 (Trece Martires–Indang Road) in Trece Martires
- West end: Antero Soriano Highway, Sabang Road, and Governor's Drive in Naic, Cavite

Location
- Country: Philippines
- Provinces: Cavite
- Major cities: Trece Martires
- Towns: Naic, Tanza

Highway system
- Roads in the Philippines; Highways; Expressways; List
← N402	→ N404

National Route 403 (N403) forms part of the Philippine highway network. It runs through central Cavite. It connects the city of Trece Martires to the municipality of Naic.

== Route description ==
The segment of Governor's Drive from its intersection with N64 (Tanza–Trece Martires Road) and N404 (Trece Martires–Indang Road) in the city proper of Trece Martires to its intersection with Antero Soriano Highway and Sabang Road in the town proper of Naic. It also passes through the municipality of Tanza in between.

This route is also known as Trece Martires–Naic Road and Dasmariñas–Trece Martires City–Naic Road.

== Intersections ==
The entire route is located in Cavite. Intersections are numbered by kilometer posts, with Rizal Park in Manila designated as kilometer zero. The kilometer count is discontinuous.

City/Municipality	km	mi	Destinations	Notes
Trece Martires	44.320	27.539	N64 (Tanza–Trece Martires Road) / N404 (Trece Martires–Indang Road) – Tanza, Indang, Dasmariñas	Continues east as N66 (Governor's Drive)
Trece Martires	45.000	27.962	Route 403 reassurance sign	
Trece Martires	45.647	28.364	Puting Tubig Bridge	
Trece Martires	46.047	28.612	Pasong Balite Bridge	
Trece Martires	47.016	29.214	Vaquero Bridge	
Tanza			No major intersections	
Tanza–Naic boundary	44.301	27.527	Cavite 1st District Engineering Office–Cavite 2nd District Engineering Office highway boundary	
Naic	45.947	28.550	Antero Soriano Highway, Sabang Road, Governor's Drive	Governor's Drive turns south as an unnumbered highway, while road physically continues west as Sabang Road; kilometer number reverses
1.000 mi = 1.609 km; 1.000 km = 0.621 mi
