= N64 highway =

Highway road in the Philippines

Route 64

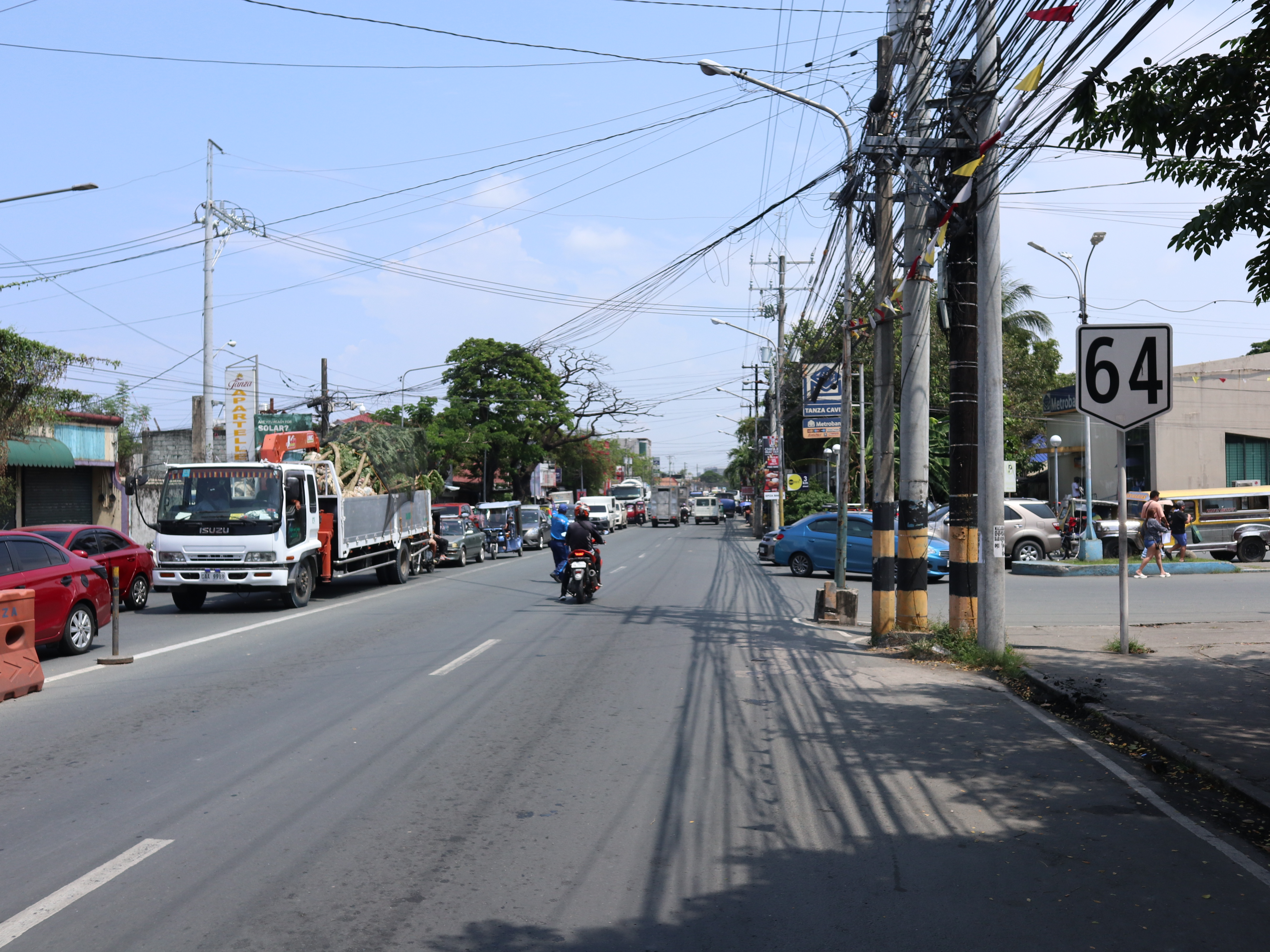
- Antero Soriano Highway in Tanza with the N64 reassurance sign

Route information
- Maintained by Department of Public Works and Highways (DPWH) - Cavite 1st District Engineering Office
- Length: 22.140 km (13.757 mi)

Major junctions
- From: N62 (Tirona Highway) / N400-2 (Covelandia Road) in Kawit
- N400 (Noveleta–Rosario Diversion Road) in Kawit and Noveleta; N401 (General Trias Drive) in General Trias; N402 (Antero Soriano Highway / San Agustin Street) in Tanza
- To: N65 / N403 (Governor's Drive) / N404 (Trece Martires–Indang Road) in Trece Martires

Location
- Country: Philippines
- Provinces: Cavite
- Major cities: Imus, General Trias, Trece Martires
- Towns: Kawit, Noveleta, Rosario, Tanza

Highway system
- Roads in the Philippines; Highways; Expressways; List
← N63	→ N65

National Route 64 (N64) forms part of the Philippine highway network. It stretches from northern to central Cavite.

== Route description ==
=== Kawit to Tanza ===
The northern section of N64 physically continues N400-1 (Covelandia Road). Prior to the construction of the CAVITEX–CALAX Link, it also connected directly to E3 (Manila–Cavite Expressway) from Metro Manila. It runs along the Centennial Road, parallel to the coast of Cavite, bypassing Kawit, Imus, Noveleta, Rosario, General Trias, and Tanza.

Its section between General Trias Drive in General Trias and Santa Cruz Street in Tanza forms part of the Noveleta–Naic–Tagaytay Road network, while its section from Santa Cruz Street to the Tanza Junction is alternatively known as Tanza Diversion Road.

=== Tanza to Trece Martires ===
At the junction in Tanza, N64 turns inland as Tanza–Trece Martires Road, 12.559-kilometer (7.804 mi), a 2- to 4-lane primary road to Trece Martires. Alongside the road, N64 ends at its junction with N65/N403 (Governor's Drive) and N404 (Trece Martires–Indang Road) in Trece Martires and is continued to the south by N404.
