= Alfonso, Cavite =

Municipality in Cavite, Philippines

Alfonso
- Municipality
- Municipality of Alfonso
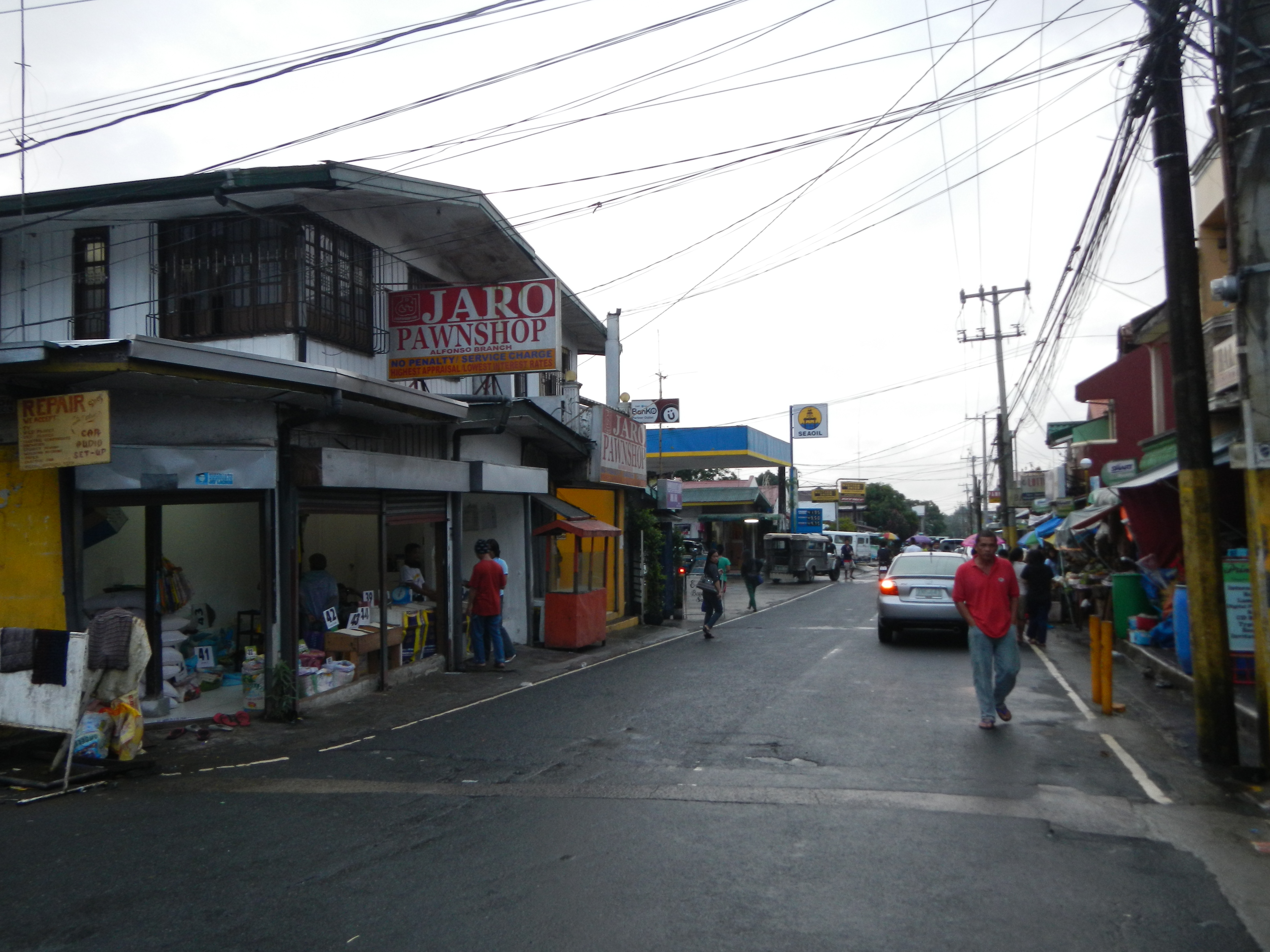
- Downtown area

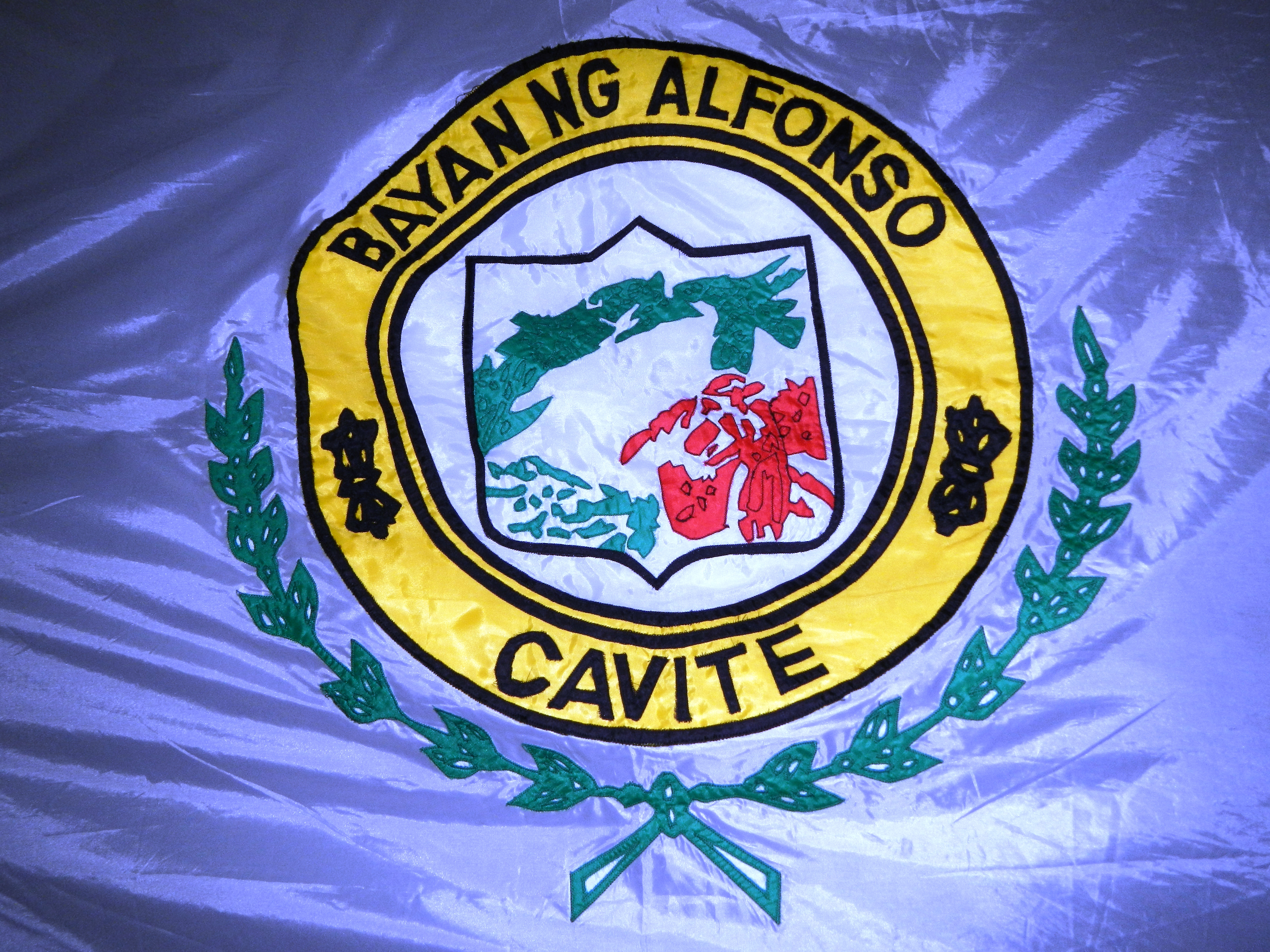
- Flag Seal
- Nickname: Agro-Industrial Center of Upland Cavite
- Map of Cavite with Alfonso highlighted
- Interactive map of Alfonso
- Location within the Philippines
- Coordinates: 14°08′16″N 120°51′19″E
- Country: Philippines
- Region: Calabarzon
- Province: Cavite
- District: 8th district
- Founded: 16 May 1859
- Named for: Alfonso XII
- Barangays: 32 (see Barangays)

Government
  - Type: Sangguniang Bayan
  - Mayor: Randy A. Salamat
  - Vice Mayor: Madona M. Pel
  - Representative: Aniela Bianca D. Tolentino
  - City Council: Members: Rex A. Ferolino; Silverio S. Perea; Jorge Michael R. Peñano; Roberto R. Varias; Joselito H. Resurreccion; Renato V. Vidallon; Cynthia A. Peji; Erwin M. Signo

Area
  - Total: 66.58 km^{2} (25.71 sq mi)
- Elevation: 356 m (1,168 ft)
- Highest elevation: 779 m (2,556 ft)
- Lowest elevation: 27 m (89 ft)

Population (2024 census)
  - Total: 60,583
  - Density: 909.9/km^{2} (2,357/sq mi)
  - Households: 14,556

Economy
  - Income class: 1st municipal income class
  - Poverty incidence: 9.89% (2023)
  - Revenue: ₱ 343.5 million (2024)
  - Assets: ₱ 1,376 million (2024)
  - Expenditure: ₱ 159.5 million (2024)
  - Liabilities: ₱ 373.9 million (2024)

Service provider
  - Electricity: Manila Electric Company (Meralco)
- Time zone: UTC+8 (PST)
- ZIP code: 4123
- PSGC: 0402101000
- IDD : area code: +63 (0)46
- Native languages: Tagalog
- Feast date: May 16
- Patron saint: St. John of Nepomuk
- Website: www.alfonso.gov.ph

Alfonso, officially the Municipality of Alfonso (Tagalog: Bayan ng Alfonso), is a municipality in the province of Cavite, Philippines. According to the 2024 census, it has a population of 60,583 people.

== History ==
=== Spanish era ===
Alfonso was largely forested until the 17th century, when small settlements began to emerge. It was originally part of Barrio Lumampong in the town of Indang. Over time, these settlements developed into sitios and later into barrios, eventually forming a separate barrio known as Alas-as. On May 16, 1859, through the efforts of local leaders Bonifacio Aveo and Felix del Mundo, the area was established as a separate district municipality from Indang. The new town retained the name Alas-as until 1876.

The name refers to the pandan tree used for the construction of houses and bears sweet fruit. It was, eventually, named after King Alfonso XII of Spain. Alfonso was initially composed of the barrios of Taywanak, Pajo, Esperanza, Marahan, Matagbak, Sinaliw and Kaytitinga.

=== Revolutionary era ===
Don Narciso Mojica was the capitan municipal of Alfonso at the outbreak of the Philippine Revolution. A few days after the Cry of Balintawak, on 31 August 1896, General Mariano Trías ordered the liquidation of all Spaniards in the municipality. In the bloody battle that followed, the leaders of the revolutionists were General Hipolito Rint, Captain Eriberto Cetro (Kapitan Berto) and Predencio Rolle (Tandang Doro).

=== American era ===
On 15 October 1903, the adjacent towns of Bailen and Mendez-Nuñez merged with Alfonso by virtue of Act No. 947 enacted by the Philippine Commission. Both towns were later separated in 1915 to become independent once again.

=== World War II ===
On February 1, 1945, (Note: The document mentions 1944, however this is contradictory as the runner mentioned in the document stated that the Americans had already landed at Nasugbu, which occurred on 31 January 1945. Therefore it is only right to assume that the document meant 1 February 1945.) the residents of Alfonso fled to hiding places in fear of advancing Japanese forces, leaving local guerrillas to defend the town. A prolonged nighttime battle followed, during which the guerrillas successfully repelled the attackers, forcing their retreat. No casualties were reported among the defending forces.

The next day, 2 February, another battle began by afternoon. However, the guerrillas were still able to hold off in their trenches, causing the Japanese to retreat. Along the way, they burned several houses in Alas-as. Eventually, a runner came and informed the townsfolk that the Americans had landed at Nasugbu.

== Geography ==
Alfonso is an upland town situated at the south-western portion of the Cavite province. It is 74 kilometers (46 mi) from Manila via Tagaytay. Magallanes bounds it on the west, Batangas province on the south, Mendez and Tagaytay on the east, General Aguinaldo on the north-west and Maragondon and Indang on the north-east.

=== Barangays ===
Alfonso is politically subdivided into 32 barangays, as indicated in the matrix below. Each barangay consists of puroks and some have sitios.

PSGC	Barangay	Population			±% p.a.	
		2024		2010		
042101001	Amuyong	3.6%	2,170	1,844	▴	1.13%
042101002	Barangay I (Pob.)	0.9%	529	549	▾	−0.26%
042101003	Barangay II (Pob.)	0.9%	560	669	▾	−1.22%
042101004	Barangay III (Pob.)	2.0%	1,236	1,296	▾	−0.33%
042101005	Barangay IV (Pob.)	2.2%	1,345	1,323	▴	0.11%
042101006	Barangay V (Pob.)	2.4%	1,466	1,374	▴	0.45%
042101007	Buck Estate	6.0%	3,638	2,546	▴	2.50%
042101008	Esperanza Ibaba	2.3%	1,409	1,101	▴	1.72%
042101009	Kaytitinga I	3.6%	2,163	1,844	▴	1.11%
042101010	Luksuhin	7.9%	4,774	3,400	▴	2.38%
042101011	Mangas I	4.0%	2,421	2,174	▴	0.75%
042101012	Marahan I	5.1%	3,088	2,591	▴	1.22%
042101013	Matagbak I	3.2%	1,940	1,597	▴	1.36%
042101014	Pajo	3.6%	2,200	1,885	▴	1.07%
042101016	Sikat	3.8%	2,284	1,667	▴	2.20%
042101017	Sinaliw Malaki	2.6%	1,604	1,380	▴	1.05%
042101018	Sinaliw na Munti	1.1%	674	461	▴	2.66%
042101019	Sulsugin	2.4%	1,459	1,253	▴	1.06%
042101020	Taywanak Ibaba	3.8%	2,330	1,866	▴	1.55%
042101021	Taywanak Ilaya	2.7%	1,664	1,368	▴	1.36%
042101022	Upli	4.2%	2,520	1,819	▴	2.28%
042101023	Kaysuyo	3.6%	2,161	1,687	▴	1.73%
042101024	Luksuhin Ilaya	3.3%	2,023	1,634	▴	1.49%
042101025	Palumlum	1.8%	1,066	873	▴	1.39%
042101026	Bilog	2.0%	1,183	1,077	▴	0.65%
042101027	Esperanza Ilaya	2.6%	1,564	1,200	▴	1.85%
042101028	Kaytitinga II	2.8%	1,707	1,467	▴	1.05%
042101029	Kaytitinga III	3.3%	1,996	1,442	▴	2.28%
042101030	Mangas II	2.4%	1,482	940	▴	3.20%
042101031	Marahan II	3.3%	2,006	1,797	▴	0.76%
042101032	Matagbak II	2.2%	1,303	1,183	▴	0.67%
042101033	Santa Teresa	2.2%	1,341	1,260	▴	0.43%
	Total		60,583	48,567	▴	1.54%

=== Climate ===
Climate data for Alfonso, Cavite
Month	Jan	Feb	Mar	Apr	May	Jun	Jul	Aug	Sep	Oct	Nov	Dec	Year
Mean daily maximum °C (°F)	26 (79)	27 (81)	29 (84)	30 (86)	29 (84)	28 (82)	26 (79)	26 (79)	26 (79)	27 (81)	27 (81)	26 (79)	27 (81)
Mean daily minimum °C (°F)	17 (63)	17 (63)	18 (64)	20 (68)	21 (70)	22 (72)	22 (72)	22 (72)	21 (70)	20 (68)	19 (66)	18 (64)	20 (68)
Average precipitation mm (inches)	11 (0.4)	13 (0.5)	14 (0.6)	32 (1.3)	101 (4.0)	142 (5.6)	208 (8.2)	187 (7.4)	175 (6.9)	131 (5.2)	68 (2.7)	39 (1.5)	1,121 (44.3)
Average rainy days	5.2	5.0	7.4	11.5	19.8	23.5	27.0	25.9	25.2	23.2	15.5	8.3	197.5
Source: Meteoblue

== Demographics ==
Population census of Alfonso
Year	Pop.	±% p.a.
1903	5,780	—
1918	7,580	+1.82%
1939	9,797	+1.23%
1948	11,714	+2.01%
1960	17,477	+3.39%
1970	17,703	+0.13%
1975	20,623	+3.11%
1980	21,980	+1.28%
1990	28,944	+2.79%
1995	34,613	+3.41%
2000	39,674	+2.97%
2007	47,973	+2.65%
2010	48,567	+0.45%
2015	51,839	+1.25%
2020	59,306	+2.87%
2024	60,583	+0.51%
Source: Philippine Statistics Authority

In the 2024 census, the population of Alfonso was 60,583 people, with a density of 910 inhabitants per square kilometre or 2,400 inhabitants per square mile.

== Economy ==
Poverty incidence of Alfonso (%)

Source: Philippine Statistics Authority

== Government ==
=== Local government ===
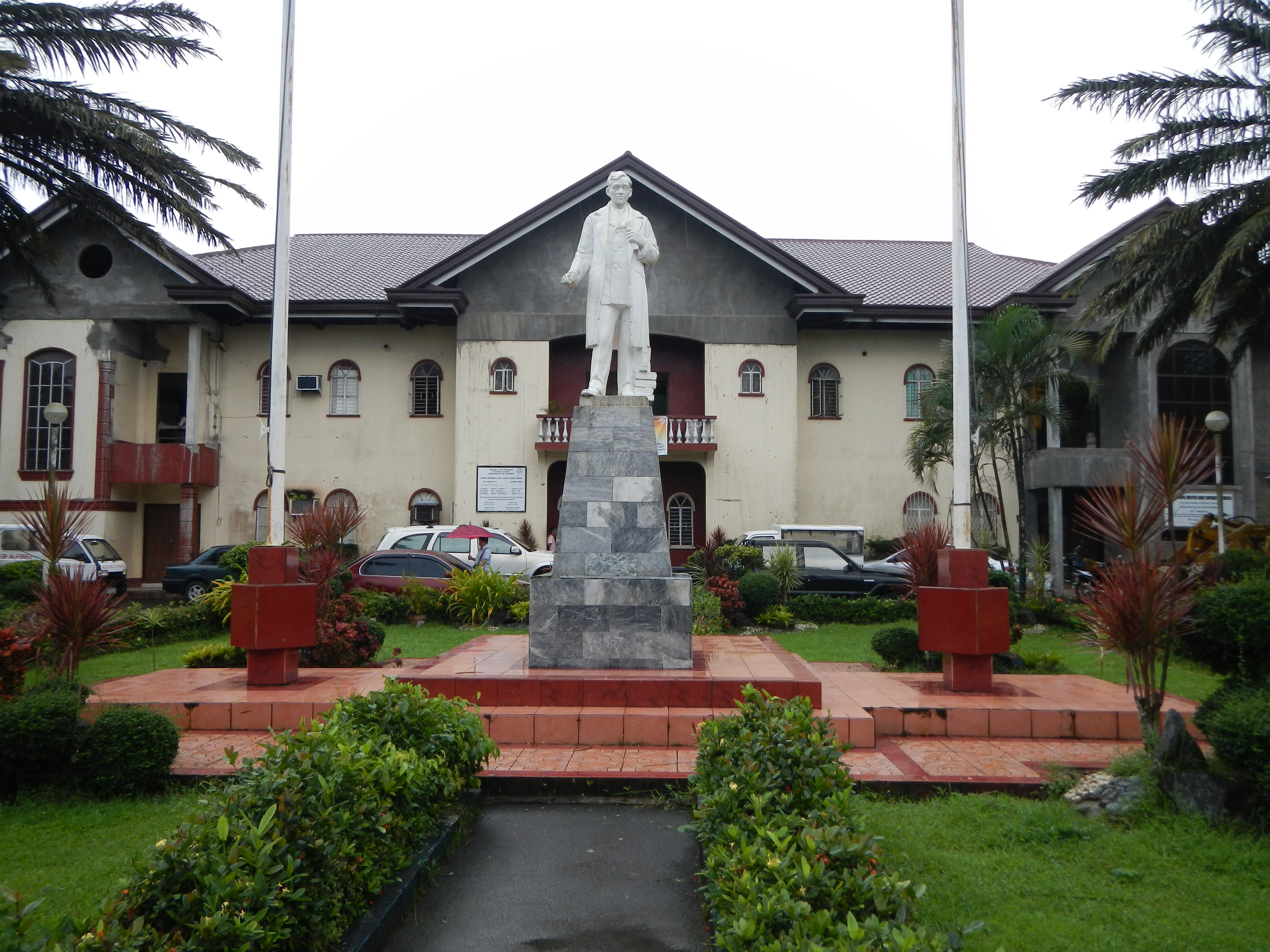
Alfonso Municipal Hall

The following are the duly elected officials of Alfonso, Cavite for the term 2022–2025.

Position	Official
Mayor	Randy A. Salamat (NUP)
Vice Mayor	Madona Mojica-Pel (NUP)

Sangguniang Bayan Members	Party
Rex A. Ferolino	NPC
Silverio S. Perea	NUP
Jeffrey James Salamat	NUP
Roberto R. Varias	NUP
Joselito H. Resurreccion	NUP
Ma.Leonor M.Reyes	(Independent)
Cynthia A. Peji	NUP
Erwin M. Signo	NUP

ABC President
Kap. Dayo Diroy
SK Federation President
Josh S. Vidallon

== Education ==
The Alfonso Schools District Office governs all educational institutions within the municipality. It oversees the management and operations of all private and public, from primary to secondary schools.

=== Primary and elementary schools ===
- Alfonso Central School
- Amuyong Elementary School
- Biblica La Delle Academy
- Bilog Elementary School
- Blessed Ville Special School Foundation
- Buck Estate Elementary School
- Esperanza Elementary School
- Gracious Gift School of Cavite
- Kaytitinga Elementary School
- Mangas Elementary School
- Marahan Elementary School
- Maranatha Living Hope Academy
- Matagbak Elementary School
- Pajo Elementary School
- Palumlum Elementary School
- Pansin Elementary School
- Parokya ni San Jose Educational Foundation
- Rosa G. Acuña Memorial Elementary School
- Sacred Heart School of Cavite
- Sicat Elementary School
- Sinaliw Elementary School
- Sulsugin Elementary School
- Taywanak Elementary School
- Upli Elementary School

=== Secondary schools ===
- Alfonso Integrated High School
- Buck Estate National High School
- Kaysuyo National High School
- Kaytitinga Integrated School
- Lucsuhin Integrated School
- Taywanak National High School

=== Higher educational institution ===
- Victorious Christian Montessori College Alfonso
