= Manila–Cavite Expressway =

Expressway in the Philippines

Coordinates: 14°28′10″N 120°57′27″E

R-1 Manila–Cavite Expressway
- Coastal Road
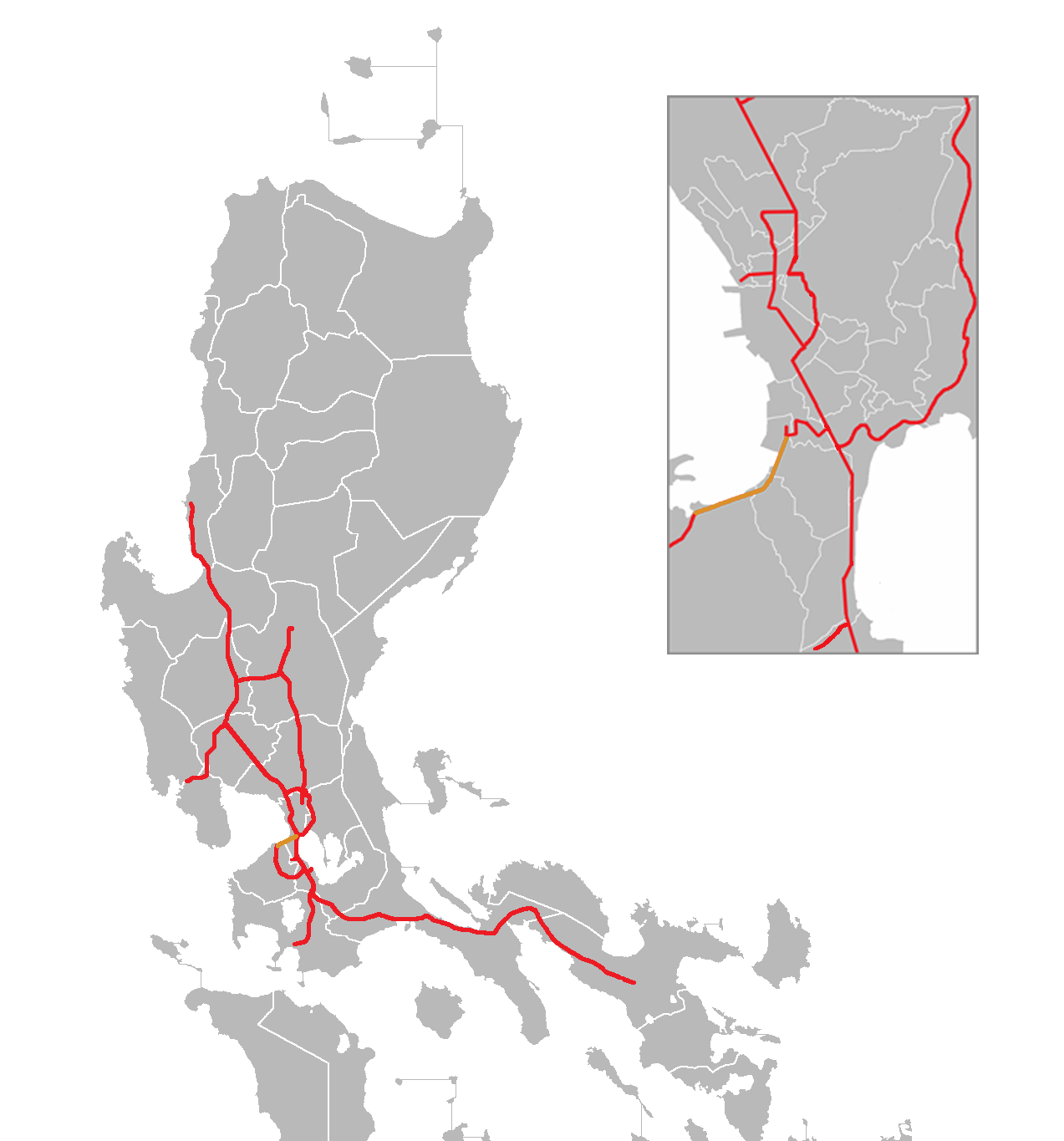
- Map of expressways in Luzon, with the Manila–Cavite Expressway in orange

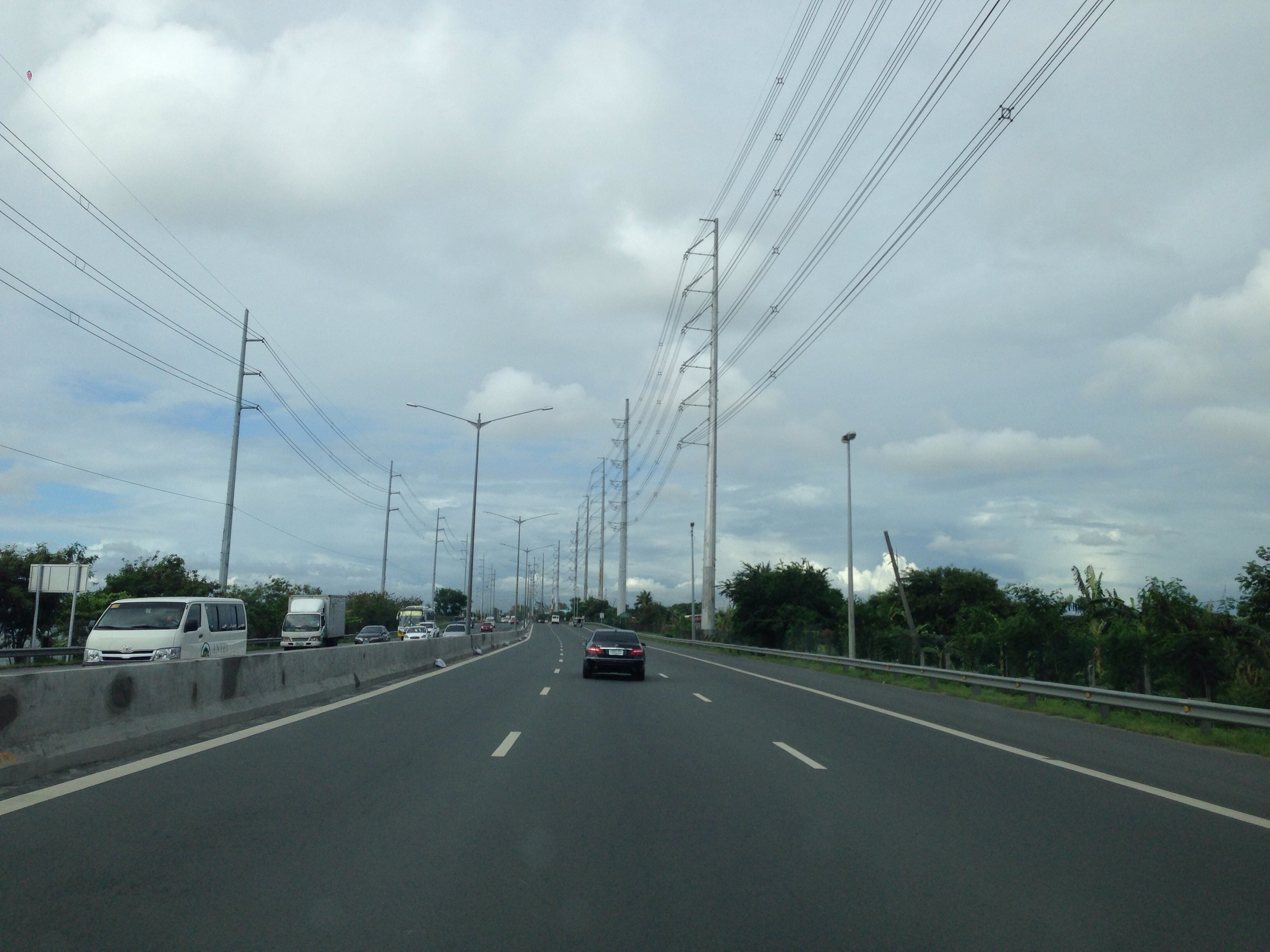
- Northbound view of CAVITEX near Zapote, Las Piñas

Route information
- Maintained by PEA Tollway Corporation and Cavite Infrastructure Corporation
- Length: 14 km (8.7 mi)
- Existed: 1998–present
- Component highways: R-1 R-1; E3
- Restrictions: No tricycles and motorcycles below 400cc

Major junctions
- North end: N61 (Roxas Boulevard) / N194 (NAIA Road) / (Seaside Drive) in Parañaque
- E6 (NAIA Expressway) in Parañaque; E5 (CAVITEX–C-5 Link) in Parañaque; N62 (Aguinaldo Boulevard) / N411 (Alabang–Zapote Road) in Bacoor
- South end: N62 (Tirona Highway) / N400-2 (Covelandia Road) in Kawit, Cavite

Future
- South end: E3 (CAVITEX–CALAX Link) / N400-2 (Covelandia Road) in Kawit, Cavite

Location
- Country: Philippines
- Regions: Calabarzon and Metro Manila
- Provinces: Cavite
- Major cities: Bacoor, Las Piñas, and Parañaque
- Towns: Kawit

Highway system
- Roads in the Philippines; Highways; Expressways; List

The Manila–Cavite Expressway, commonly referred to as CAVITEX, (Note: It is also referred to by its former and alternative names: Coastal Road, Manila–Cavite Coastal Road, R-1 Expressway, and Aguinaldo Boulevard. It is also officially known as the Manila–Cavite Toll Expressway Project (MCTEP).) is a 14-kilometer-long (8.7 mi) controlled-access highway linking Metro Manila to the province of Cavite in the Philippines. Its northern terminus is at Roxas Boulevard in Parañaque, while its southern terminus in Kawit will be connected to the CAVITEX–CALAX Link (CCLink), which will provide a direct connection to the Cavite–Laguna Expressway (CALAX) upon completion. It forms part of Expressway 3 (E3) of the Philippine expressway network and Radial Road 1 (R-1) of Metro Manila's arterial road network.

CAVITEX is operated and maintained by the PEA Tollway Corporation (PEATC), (Note: PEA stands for "Public Estates Authority", the former name of the Philippine Reclamation Authority (PRA).) a non-chartered government-owned and controlled corporation (GOCC) and a subsidiary of the Philippine Reclamation Authority (PRA), an agency under the Office of the President. PEATC is in a joint venture with the Cavite Infrastructure Corporation (CIC), a unit of Metro Pacific Investments.

== Route description ==
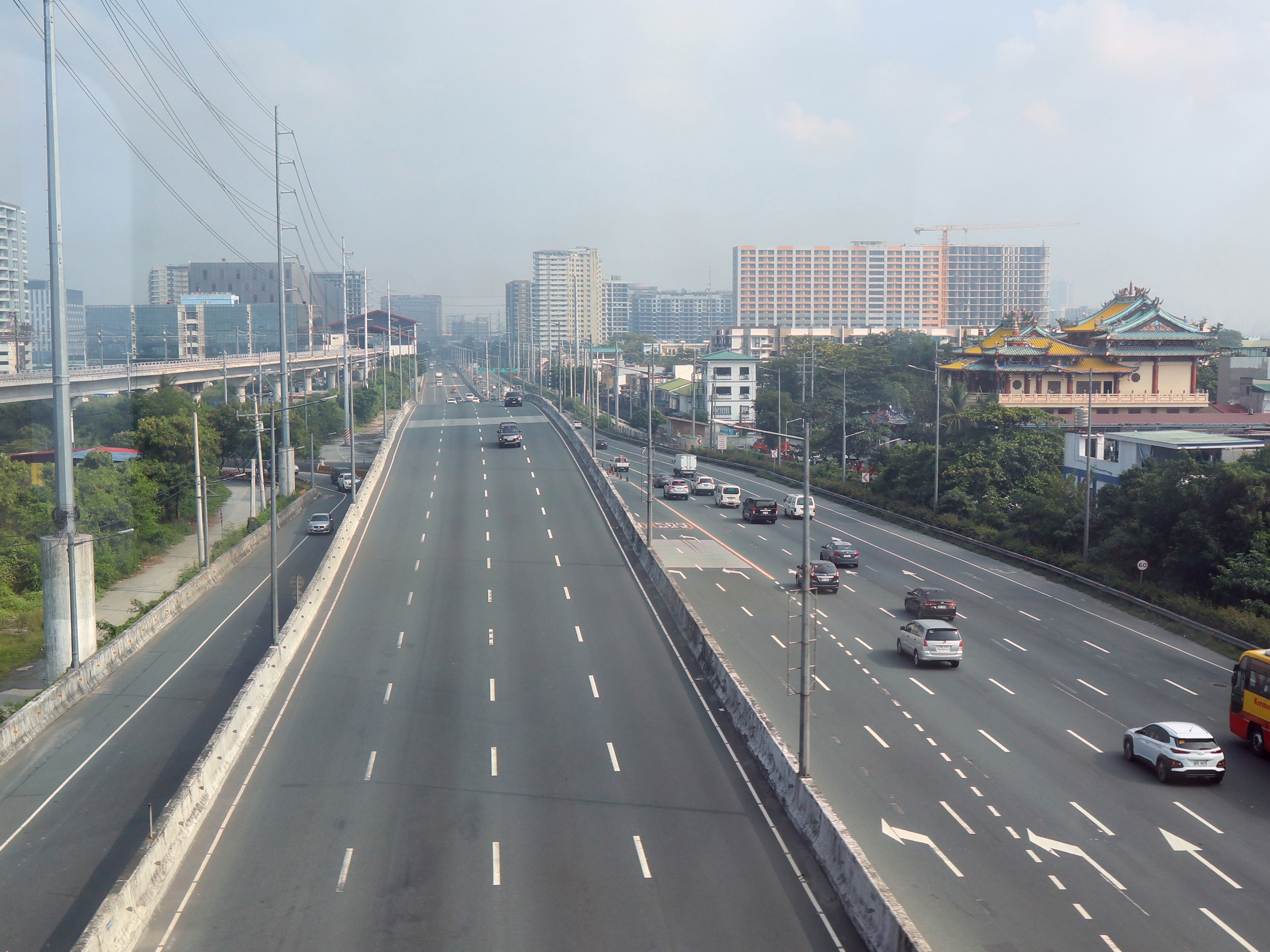
The expressway at its interchange with Pacific Avenue in Parañaque

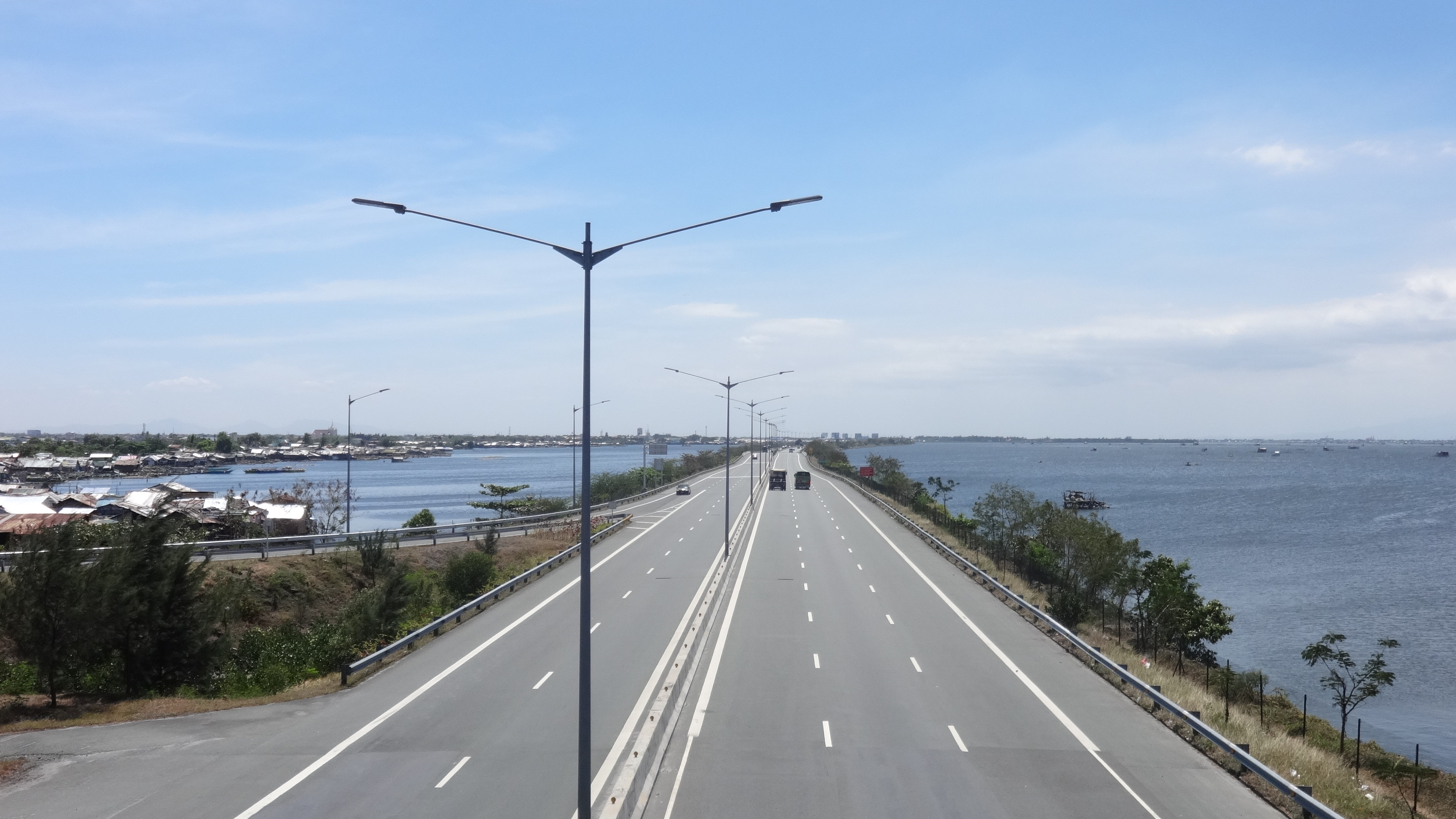
The expressway's Kawit extension

The Manila–Cavite Expressway follows a mostly curving route on the southwestern shore of Manila Bay, and the Bacoor–Kawit extension is built on reclaimed land near the coastal barangays of Bacoor. The road uses a barrier toll system, which involves toll barriers at entry points and no toll collection at the exit points, except at the Kawit and Parañaque toll plazas. The expressway is a physical extension of Roxas Boulevard. The lane count typically consists of four lanes per direction in Segment 1 (Parañaque to Zapote, Bacoor), originally known as Coastal Road, and two lanes per direction in Segment 4 and its extension (Bacoor to Kawit), also known as the Kawit extension and forms part of R-1 Extension; it widens to 24 total lanes at the Parañaque toll plaza and 21 at the Kawit toll plaza.

The expressway starts at the traffic light intersection with NAIA Road, Roxas Boulevard, and New Seaside Drive in Barangay Tambo. Past the intersection is an eastbound entrance and westbound exit of NAIA Expressway. The only at-grade intersection of the expressway then comes at its intersection with Pacific Avenue, where southbound motorists are also carried by the Pacific Avenue Flyover. The expressway then meets the western terminus of the CAVITEX–C-5 Link and widens on approach to the Parañaque toll plaza. Past the toll plaza, it meets a right-in/right-out interchange with the Circumferential Road 5 (C-5) Extension, accessible only for northbound motorists. The expressway then enters the province of Cavite and passes the Bacoor (Longos) Exit, the original end of the expressway at Bacoor, where the original alignment involved a curve that was changed to a full interchange with the opening of the Kawit extension. CAVITEX past Bacoor Exit becomes a four-lane dual carriageway on reclaimed land built on the shores of the seaside barangays of Bacoor. The expressway widens once again at the approach to the Kawit toll plaza. The terminus at Kawit is a box intersection with Tirona Highway, Covelandia Road, and Antero Soriano Highway, which is the physical extension of the existing expressway. The end of the expressway at Kawit will accommodate the Cavite end of the Cavite–Laguna Expressway.

== History ==
=== Proposed Cavite Boulevard ===
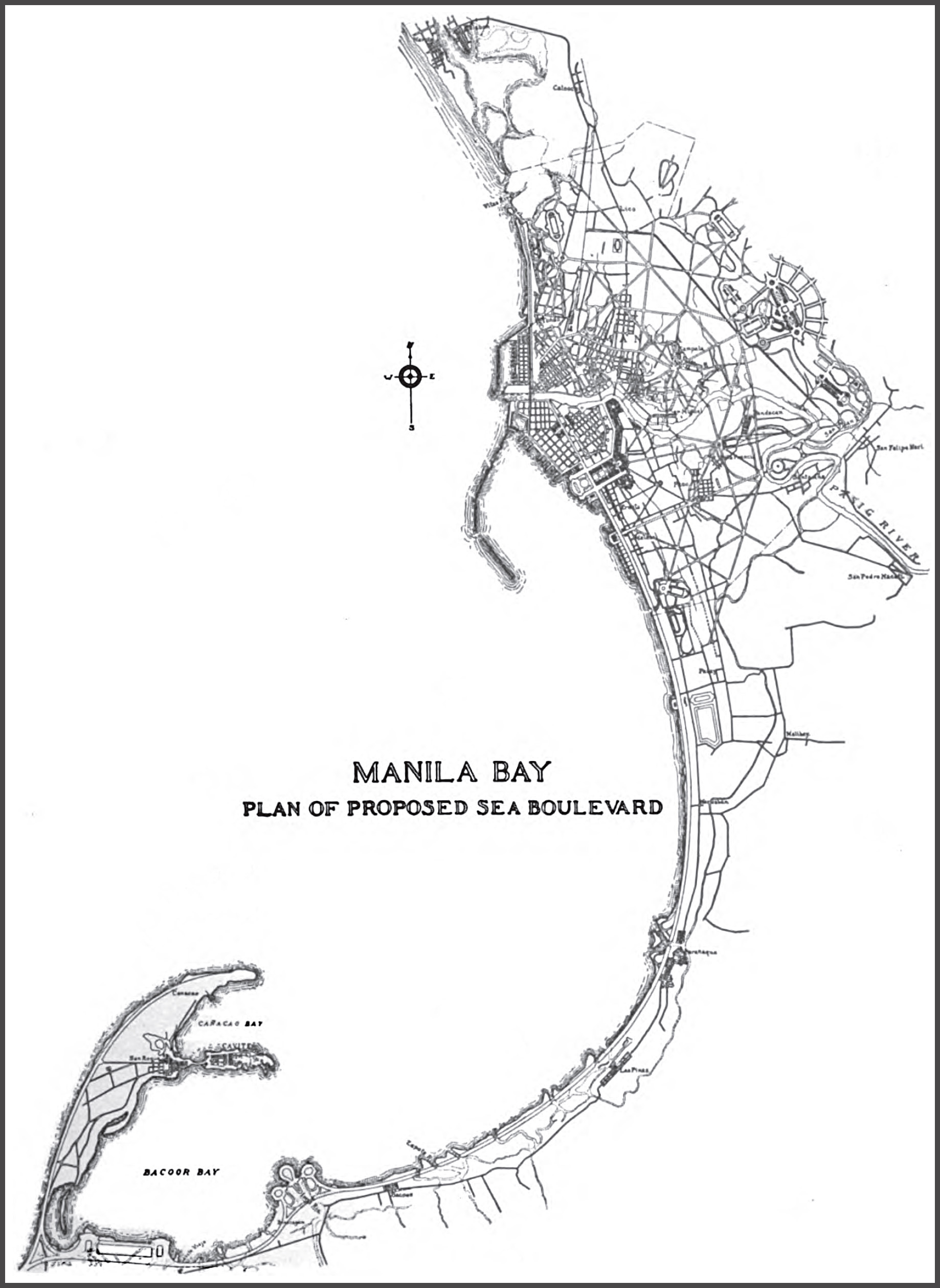
Daniel Burnham's plan of the Cavite Boulevard from Manila to Cavite

Even before the conception of the expressway, the Cavite Boulevard was planned by Architect Daniel Burnham to connect the city of Manila with the province of Cavite as part of his plan to beautify the city. According to his original concept of the Cavite Boulevard, the bayfront boulevard would be built on reclaimed land from Luneta in Manila to Cavite Navy Yard, about 20 miles (32 km) away, as it follows the shoreline to Cavite. However, the present-day Roxas Boulevard, a part of this plan, was built up to Parañaque only.

=== As an untolled road ===
In 1963, Republic Act No. 3572 was enacted to allocate funds for the extension of Dewey Boulevard (now Roxas Boulevard) to Cavite City, realizing the long-envisioned plan for the bayfront boulevard initially conceived by Daniel Burnham. In 1973, under the administration of President Ferdinand Marcos, they proposed a planned highway, dubbed the Manila Bay Coastal Road Project, and its route would be started at the CCP Complex near the Manila-Pasay Boundary to Bacoor. However, this was later converted into two boulevards: Macapagal Boulevard and Jose W. Diokno Boulevard. The Construction and Development Corporation of the Philippines (CDCP), now the Philippine National Construction Corporation (PNCC), entered into a contract with the Republic of the Philippines, represented by the then Department of Public Highways (DPH), now the Department of Public Works and Highways (DPWH), dated November 20, of that year, for the construction of the Manila-Cavite Coastal Road and the reclamation of some portions of the foreshore and off-shore lands along Manila Bay at the PNCC's own expense, otherwise known as the Manila-Cavite Coastal Road and Reclamation Project (MCCRRP). The contract was awarded to Marubeni.

In response to the daily traffic congestion in the narrow passage between Parañaque and Las Piñas leading to Cavite, the government later constructed a 6.6-kilometer (4.1 mi), four-lane (two on each side) asphalt reclaimed road from Roxas Boulevard leading to the then-municipalities of Parañaque, Las Piñas, and Bacoor which opened in 1985. In 1988, the final construction work was completed and conducted that year, and the road was expanded into four lanes. Originally named the Manila–Cavite Coastal Road, it was renamed Aguinaldo Boulevard in 1989.

=== As an expressway ===
==== Development and construction ====
The road deteriorated so fast that it needed to be upgraded to toll standards. This led to the Manila-Cavite Toll Expressway Project (MCTEP), more popularly known as "Coastal Road". It is a joint venture project of the Public Estates Authority (now the Philippine Reclamation Authority) and the Malaysian group of Majlis Amanah Rakyat (MARA) and Renong Berhad (Renong).

The project is an offshoot of the February 3, 1994, state visit to the Philippines of then Malaysian Prime Minister Mahathir Mohamad, where a Memorandum of Understanding for joint and cooperative implementation of critical infrastructure projects in the Philippines was signed. The MOU provided, among others, the construction and completion of the Manila-Cavite Toll Expressway and the expansion, extension, and modernization of other roadways and tollway systems. The project is a major component of a vast network of inter-urban roads traversing six municipalities, namely Parañaque, Las Piñas, Bacoor, Imus, Kawit, and Noveleta.

On December 27, 1994, a Joint Venture Agreement by and between the PEA, MARA and Renong was signed whereby PEA shall ensure that all land and rights of way necessary are made available for the carrying out of the Design and Construction Works obligation of the Malaysian parties. The groundbreaking for the new expressway took place on September 14, 1995, beginning with Segment 1, which included widening the existing mainline from Parañaque to Zapote and upgrading existing bridges. On July 26, 1996, the Toll Operation Agreement between the Republic of the Philippines (acting through the Toll Regulatory Board), Public Estates Authority and UEM-Mara Philippines Corporation was signed. It was under this Agreement that PEA Tollway Corporation (PEATC) was created. Under the agreement, PEATC is to undertake and perform the obligations of PEA, which principally provides the operation and maintenance of the toll roads or any of its segments. Commercial operations started on May 24, 1998.

On December 15, 1999, Coastal Road Corporation, a wholly owned Filipino entity, bought all UEM and MARA shares in UEM-Mara Philippines Corporation. The buy-out officially relinquished all the obligations and liabilities of the Malaysian Companies under the JVA and the TOA, as CRC took over the project's management and immediately undertook the unfinished portions of the MCTE Project.

On November 14, 2006, an Operations and Maintenance Agreement was signed between the Philippine Reclamation Authority, UEM-Mara Philippines Corporation (UMPC), and the Toll Regulatory Board, giving UMPC participation in the operations and maintenance of the expressway. In December 2012, Metro Pacific Investments Corporation acquired Cavitex Holdings Inc. for P6.77 billion, and the company assumed management assistance on January 2, 2013.

==== Extensions and expansions ====
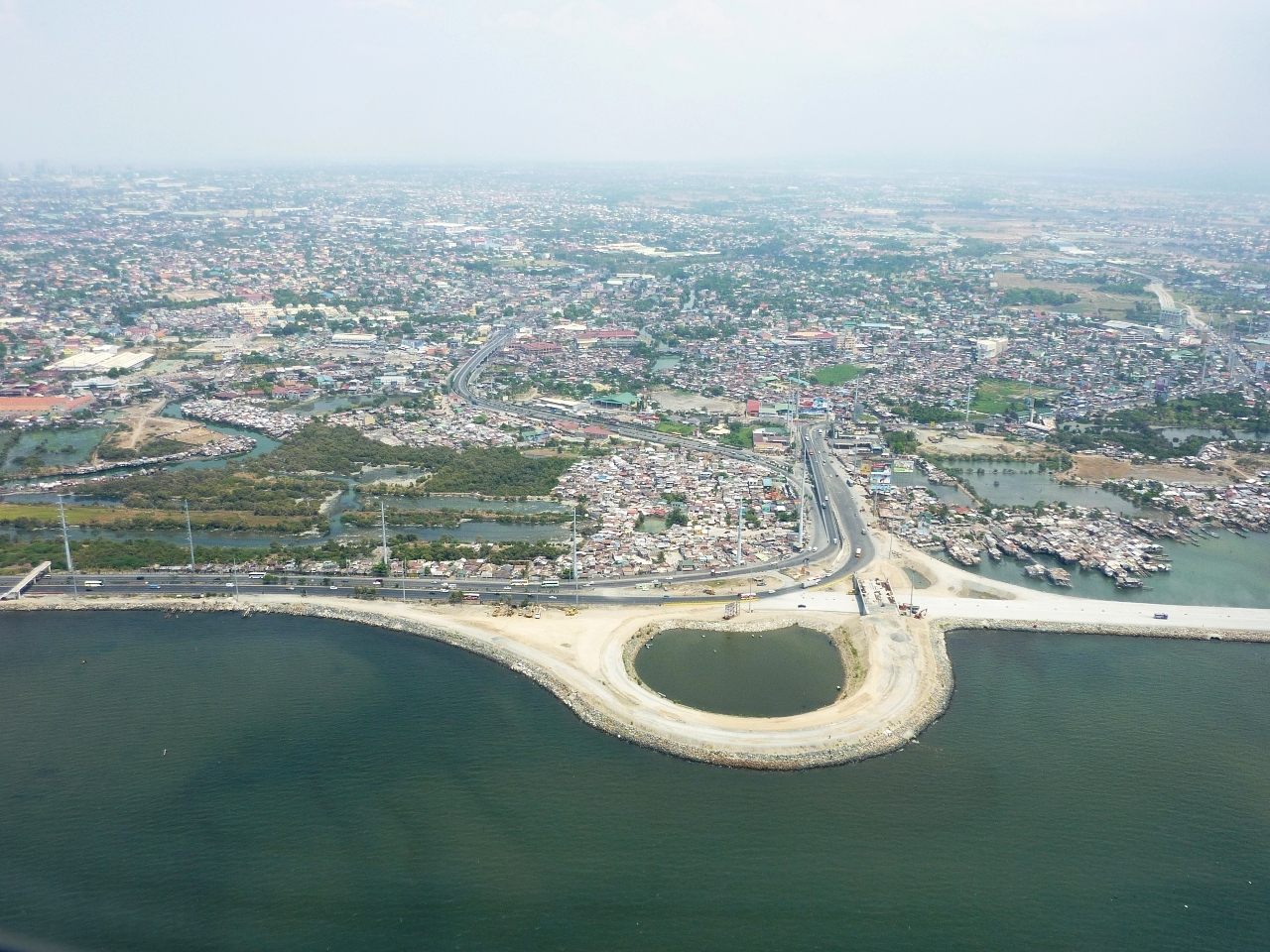
Zapote Interchange under construction in 2010 as part of the R1 Expressway Extension project

On February 7, 2004, President Gloria Macapagal Arroyo led the groundbreaking rites for the extension called Segment 4. In the following year, the construction of the expressway's 7-kilometer (4.3 mi) extension from Bacoor to Kawit, Cavite, known as the R1 Expressway Extension, was started; it was inaugurated on April 27, 2011 by President Benigno Aquino III and formally opened to motorists on May 1. In 2015, the C-5 Road was extended south to connect to the northbound lanes of the expressway in Las Piñas.

On December 28, 2016, the access ramps connecting Coastal Road and NAIA Expressway opened to motorists from Cavite and Las Piñas for easier access to NAIA Terminals 1, 2, and 3 and vice versa.

The Pacific Avenue flyover, which was planned in 2016, started construction in 2017 and was expected to be completed by March 2018. However, due to difficulties in transporting equipment and the flyover's location between the northbound and southbound parts of the expressway, the completion date was moved to August 2018. The flyover eliminated the signalized intersection for vehicles bound for Diosdado Macapagal Boulevard via Pacific Avenue and improved traffic around it.

By June 2018, the expressway is being expanded with the construction of additional lanes on the NAIA–Zapote segment. On September 3, 2024, the Kabihasnan entry toll plaza in Parañaque was permanently closed.

==== Dispute over the expressway operations ====
In 2024, PEATC demanded the turnover of the operations and maintenance (O&M) of the expressway from the Cavitex Infrastructure Corporation, and the company belied the claims of the Metro Pacific Tollways Corporation (MPTC) in the mandamus case filed before the Court of Appeals (CA) for the return of the CAVITEX. In May of that year, PEATC insisted on its right to control the management and collection of fees amid a row with another company that already reached the Court of Appeals. CAVITEX Infrastructure Corp. has filed with PEATC over the alleged unauthorized filing of a petition seeking to remove CIC's right to manage and operate the expressway.

However, the government cannot seize control of operations and maintenance before the expiration of its concession period. The CIC said all the costs of the private concessionaire will have to be refunded if PEATC, a government-owned and controlled corporation, insists on taking over the CAVITEX operations.

== Future ==
=== CAVITEX–CALAX Link ===
The Segment 4 Extension, or simply the CAVITEX–CALAX Link (CCLink), is a 1.3-kilometer (0.81 mi) elevated connector road in Kawit that will connect CAVITEX and the Cavite–Laguna Expressway (CALAX). It is expected to be completed in the second quarter of 2025. It will complete the E3 link gap by connecting the respective Kawit interchanges of both expressways via the Antero Soriano Highway right-of-way.

On June 21, 2024, President Bongbong Marcos and Manuel Pangilinan led the groundbreaking of the CAVITEX–CALAX Link.

=== NLEX Harbor Link connection ===
A proposal to connect the NLEX Harbor Link in Navotas with CAVITEX near Pacific Avenue was revealed by NLEX Corporation to connect NLEX to CAVITEX seamlessly. The expressway will be a six-lane elevated expressway (on most of the expressway above R-10 and R-1) built in phases. NLEX is currently proposing the first phase of this expressway, with a length of 5.1 kilometers (3.2 mi) from Navotas Interchange of NLEX Harbor Link on Navotas to Anda Circle in Manila, with the proposed budget between ₱15 billion and ₱16 billion. Also, this plan would have connected to CAVITEX in the future with a total length of 9.4 kilometers. However, the project was not realized when San Miguel Corporation proposed its expressway project, the Southern Access Link Expressway (SALEX), using the same alignment as NLEX Corporation and CIC's proposal. If plans are further realized, an interchange could be built in Navotas that can mark the junction between the said expressway, NLEX Harbor Link and a future expressway that connects to the New Manila International Airport

=== Segment 5 ===
Segment 5 of the expressway was proposed in the 1990s, and the extension would have been a 4-kilometer (2.5 mi) extension from Kawit to the intersection of EPZA Diversion Road in Noveleta. However, the route was revised when the development of CALAX started in the 2010s.

In 2018, Metro Pacific Investments Corporation submitted a proposal to the Toll Regulatory Board to extend the expressway from Kawit to Noveleta, as well as an extension further west up to Tanza and north up to Cavite City. The 9.5-kilometer (5.9 mi) extension is estimated to cost ₱22.5 billion. A part of the R1 Expressway Extension project that includes the existing Segment 4 (Zapote–Kawit segment), the project proposal also includes a spur road accommodating vehicles from the Cavite Export Processing Zone. As of 2026, the project has yet to be finalized by the government.

=== Sangley Point extension ===
A proposal to extend the expressway from Kawit to Sangley Point Airport in Cavite City was submitted to the Department of Public Works and Highways in 2017 by CAVITEx Holdings, Inc. The proposed project aims to construct a 4.63-kilometer-long (2.88 mi) viaduct. Its cost is yet to be determined as it awaits approval from the government. It is not to be confused with Segment 5.3, which will branch from Noveleta to Cavite City.

Years later, the proposed Sangley Boulevard forms part of the Sangley Point International Airport (SPIA) project. It is planned as a 4.90-kilometer expressway linking CAVITEX near Island Cove in Kawit with Sangley Point International Airport in Cavite City, providing a dedicated connection between the existing expressway network and the proposed airport.

== Toll ==
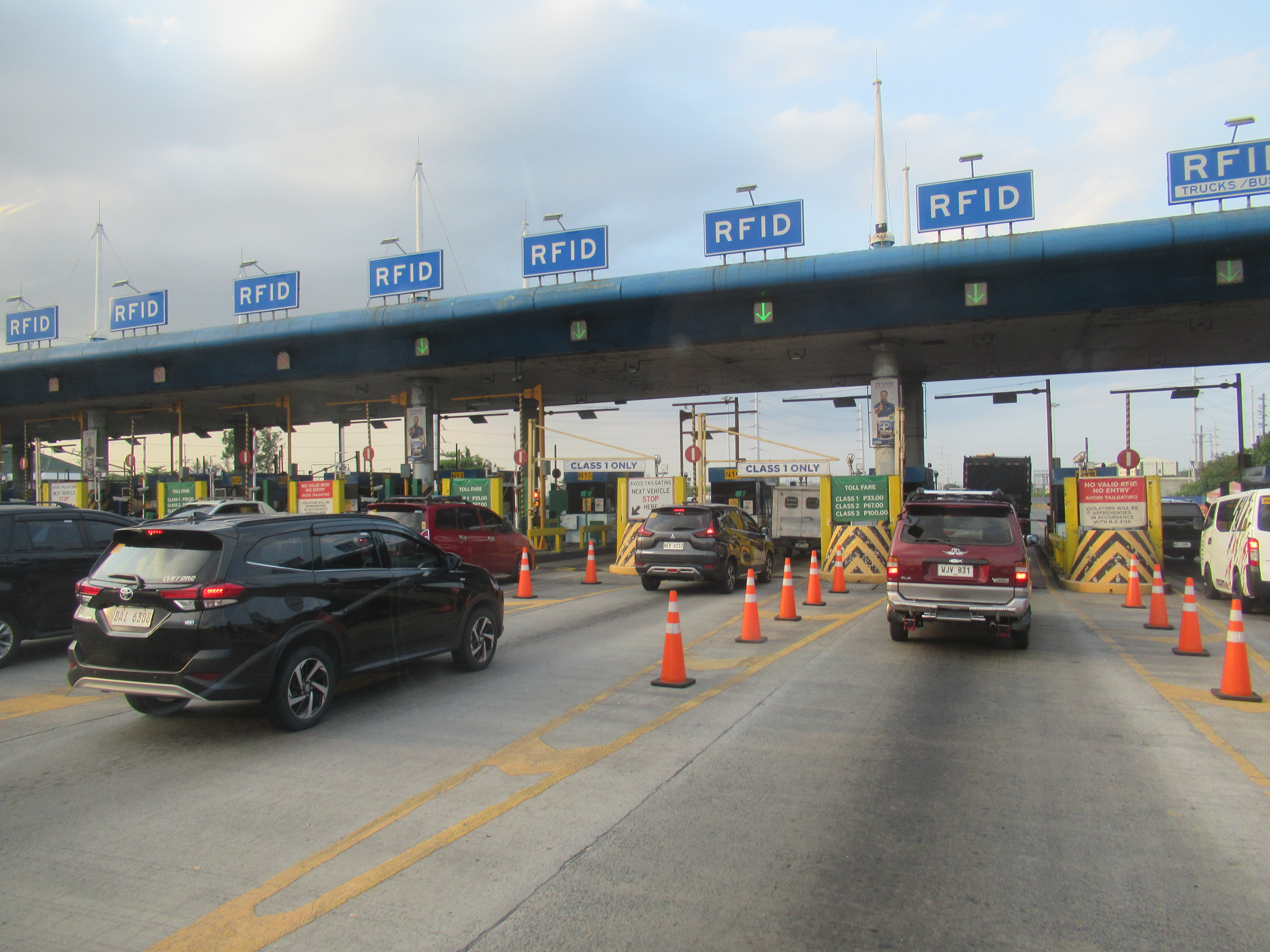
Parañaque Toll Plaza

The expressway features a limited number of interchanges. The original south terminus in Bacoor has been converted into a full trumpet interchange. There are two toll barriers on the expressway: the original barrier in Parañaque and the extension barrier in Kawit. Vehicles are charged a flat toll rate based on vehicle class.

The expressway employs a barrier toll system at entry points, with fixed toll rates. Toll collection points are the Parañaque and Kawit toll plazas, while the Kabihasnan toll plaza served as one until its permanent closure in 2024. Exit points do not have toll collection. For vehicles using the CAVITEX–C-5 Link, tolls for the segments from Zapote eastwards are collected there instead of the Parañaque toll plaza. PEATC has also incorporated a near-field communication prepaid card it calls E-TAP. The expressway also now accepts an electronic toll collection (ETC) system called Easytrip RFID, which currently manages ETC for the North Luzon Expressway, Subic–Clark–Tarlac Expressway, and Cavite–Laguna Expressway. ETC collections are made on both dedicated and mixed lanes at the toll barriers.

Tolls are assessed in each direction at each barrier, based on class. Under the law, all toll rates include a 12% value-added tax.

Class	Parañaque (R-1 Expressway)	Kawit (R-1 Expressway Extension)
1	₱39.00	₱103.00
2	₱78.00	₱207.00
3	₱117.00	₱310.00

== Exits ==
Exits are numbered by kilometer posts, with Rizal Park in Manila designated as kilometer zero.

Region	Province	City/Municipality	km	mi	Exit	Name	Destinations	Notes
Metro Manila	Parañaque		8	5.0		Tambo	N194 (NAIA Road) / Seaside Drive – Airport, Manila, Bay City	Northern terminus; continues north as N61 (Roxas Boulevard); future connection with Southern Access Link Expressway (SALEX)
Metro Manila	Parañaque		8.3	5.2			E6 (NAIAx) – Airport, Skyway	Northbound exit and southbound entrance
Metro Manila	Parañaque		8.45	5.25	Caltex service station (southbound only), demolished			
Metro Manila	Parañaque		10	6.2		Pacific Avenue	Pacific Avenue – PITX, Macapagal Boulevard	Northbound exit and current southbound entry, Flyover half-T interchange; no right turns from southbound lane. Former traffic light intersection.
Metro Manila	Parañaque		13	8.1		Kabihasnan		Tolled northbound entrance (until 2025) (Note: This source initially announced its closure in September 2024, but its operations was extended until March 1, 2025, during the partial opening of CAVITEX–C-5 Link that features Parañaque (Sucat) on/off-ramp exit that leads to Ninoy Aquino Avenue. That exit would make the Kabihasnan entrance ramp virtually redundant.)
Metro Manila	Parañaque		13	8.1		CAVITEX–C-5 Link	E5 (CAVITEX–C-5 Link) – Taguig	Trumpet interchange
Metro Manila	Parañaque		13	8.1	Parañaque toll plaza			
Metro Manila	Las Piñas		14	8.7			C-5 Road Extension	Northbound entrance only
Calabarzon	Cavite	Bacoor	15	9.3		Longos	N62 (Aguinaldo Boulevard) / N411 (Alabang–Zapote Road) – Las Piñas, Bacoor	Zapote Interchange. Trumpet interchange; former southern terminus (1998–2011)
Calabarzon	Cavite	Bacoor			Viaduct 1 over Bacoor Bay			
Calabarzon	Cavite	Bacoor			Viaduct 2 over Bacoor Bay			
Calabarzon	Cavite	Bacoor			Viaduct 3 over Bacoor Bay			
Calabarzon	Cavite	Bacoor				Sangley Boulevard	– Sangley Point Cargo City, Sangley Point International Airport	Proposed interchange providing access to Sangley Point Cargo City (SPCC) and Sangley Point International Airport (SPIA); Sangley Boulevard connects CAVITEX Segment 4 near Island Cove with SPIA across Bacoor Bay and Fort San Felipe.
Calabarzon	Cavite	Kawit			Imus Viaduct over the Imus River			
Calabarzon	Cavite	Kawit	23	14	Kawit toll plaza			
Calabarzon	Cavite	Kawit	24	15		Marulas	N62 (Tirona Highway) – Cavite City, Noveleta	Southbound exit only
Calabarzon	Cavite	Kawit	24	15		Binakayan (Zeus)	N62 (Tirona Highway) / N64 (Antero Soriano Highway) / N400-2 (Covelandia Road) – Binakayan (Kawit), Tanza, Ternate, Maragondon, Nasugbu	Southern end of R-1 concurrency, current southern terminus; future connection to Segment 5
Calabarzon	Cavite	Kawit			Future southern terminus (CAVITEX–CALAX Link) after Binakayan exit and connecting with Kawit Viaduct Extension before Kawit interchange; continues south as E3 (Cavite–Laguna Expressway)			
1.000 mi = 1.609 km; 1.000 km = 0.621 mi: Closed/former; Concurrency terminus; Incomplete access; Tolled; Unopened

=== Segment 5 ===
The entire route is located in Cavite.

City/Municipality	km	mi	Exit	Name	Destinations	Notes
Kawit				Binakayan (Zeus)	E3 (CAVITEX) – Manila, Laguna	Connection to the existing CAVITEX
Noveleta				Noveleta	N62 (Manila–Cavite Road)	End of Segment 5.1 and start of Segment 5.2
Noveleta					CEPZ Spur Road – CEPZ	
Rosario				Rosario	Rosario	Various alignments under consideration
Tanza			Tanza toll plaza			
Tanza				Tanza	N402 (Antero Soriano Highway)	Future southern terminus
1.000 mi = 1.609 km; 1.000 km = 0.621 mi: Tolled; Unopened

=== Sangley Boulevard ===
The entire route is located in Cavite.

City/Municipality	km	mi	Exit	Name	Destinations	Notes
Kawit				Sangley Boulevard	E3 (CAVITEX)	Southern terminus; connection to the main line at CAVITEX Segment 4 near Island Cove.
Cavite City				Sangley Point Cargo City		Access to Sangley Point Cargo City (SPCC).
Cavite City				Airport Junction	Sangley Point International Airport	Northern terminus.
1.000 mi = 1.609 km; 1.000 km = 0.621 mi: Unopened
