= CAVITEX–CALAX Link =

Highway viaduct in Kawit, Cavite, Philippines

- Carries: E3 (Manila–Cavite Expressway and Cavite–Laguna Expressway)
- Crosses: N64 (Antero Soriano Highway)
- Locale: Kawit, Cavite, Philippines
- Official name: CAVITEX Segment 4 Extension
- Maintained by: Cavitex Infrastructure Corporation (CIC) / MPCALA Holdings Incorporated (Metro Pacific Tollways Corporation)

Characteristics
- Design: Elevated viaduct (Prestressed concrete box girder)
- Material: Prestressed concrete, structural steel
- Total length: 1 kilometer (0.62 mi)
- No. of lanes: 4 lanes (2×2 dual carriageway)

History
- Engineering design by: DCCD Engineering Corporation (main viaduct)
- Constructed by: EEI Corporation (main viaduct); Leighton Asia (Kawit Viaduct Extension)
- Opening: 2026 (expected)

Statistics
- Toll: Integrated into CAVITEX / CALAX toll network

The CAVITEX–CALAX Link (CCLink), officially the CAVITEX Segment 4 Extension, is a 1-kilometer-long (0.6 mi), four-lane viaduct currently under construction in Kawit, Cavite, Philippines. It connects the southern terminus of the Manila–Cavite Expressway (CAVITEX) to the northern terminus of the Cavite–Laguna Expressway (CALAX), providing a direct connection between the two expressways.

The project is owned and operated by Cavitex Infrastructure Corporation (CIC), a subsidiary of Metro Pacific Tollways Corporation (MPTC), which is a parent of Metro Pacific Investments, in a joint venture with the Philippine Reclamation Authority (PRA).

== Project Overview ==
The CAVITEX–CALAX Link addresses the critical regional traffic bottleneck between Metro Manila's coastal corridor and Cavite's industrial and residential hubs. Prior to its construction, vehicles transferring between CAVITEX and CALAX were required to navigate surface-level intersections along Tirona Highway, Antero Soriano Highway (N64), and Centennial Road in Kawit.

The elevated link consists of a 2×2 dual-carriageway main alignment viaduct, connecting ramps, and an updated toll administration compound. Once fully operational, it allows continuous high-speed transit from Roxas Boulevard in Manila directly to Mamplasan, Biñan in Laguna.

== History ==
=== Background and conceptualization ===
The Manila–Cavite Expressway (CAVITEX) and the Cavite–Laguna Expressway (CALAX) were originally conceptualized as separate routes. As suburban development expanded rapidly in Cavite, vehicles transferring between the southern terminus of CAVITEX and CALAX faced major congestion on local arterial roads.

To resolve this issue, a direct elevated connector road—designated as the CAVITEX Segment 4 Extension—was incorporated into the government's Public-Private Partnership (PPP) agenda under the Department of Public Works and Highways (DPWH) and the Philippine Reclamation Authority (PRA).

=== Groundbreaking and execution ===
On May 24, 2024, project concessionaire Cavitex Infrastructure Corporation (CIC), in partnership with the PRA, signed the ₱1.79-billion main civil works contract with EEI Corporation to build the 1.2-kilometer elevated viaduct and associated ramp infrastructure.

The project's official groundbreaking ceremony took place on June 21, 2024, led by President Bongbong Marcos alongside Metro Pacific Tollways Corporation (MPTC) executives.

Primary civil construction officially commenced on October 1, 2024, marked by traffic rerouting measures and lane adjustments along Centennial Road and Covelandia Road in Kawit to facilitate foundation piling works. Leighton Asia was contracted to construct the interfacing structural works connecting the viaduct directly into CALAX Subsection 1.

Throughout late 2024 and 2025, structural construction progressed across the site with deep pile driving, pier column erection, and the launching of precast concrete box girders over major thoroughfares. Independent field updates by Dimitri Valencia tracked the full completion of girder installations along the Kawit Viaduct Extension in early 2026.

== Construction ==
On May 24, 2024, Cavitex Infrastructure Corporation (CIC) officially signed the ₱1.79-billion construction contract for the Segment 4 Extension with EEI Corporation. Site preparation and primary civil works officially commenced on October 1, 2024, marked by traffic rerouting and lane adjustments along Centennial Road and Covelandia Road in Kawit.

Construction responsibilities were divided as follows:

- EEI Corporation: Main alignment elevated viaduct, main ramp structures, access roads, Kawit toll administrative compound, and Centennial Road intersection improvements.
- Leighton Asia: Interfacing structural civil works linking the viaduct directly into CALAX Subsection 1 (Kawit Segment).

By early 2026, major structural milestones were achieved. Field progress reports by infrastructure video chronicler Dimitri Valencia documented the completion of girder installations along the Kawit Viaduct Extension between January and February 2026, leading into final deck slabbing, asphalt paving, and toll facility fittings.

== See also ==
- List of bridges in the Philippines
