= R-7 expressway =

R-7 Expressway can refer to:

- R7 expressway (Czech Republic)
- R-7 Expressway (Philippines)
- R7 expressway (Slovakia)
