= Philippine expressway network =

- Shields for E1 (expressway) / AH26 (Pan-Philippine Highway) and E5 (expressway)

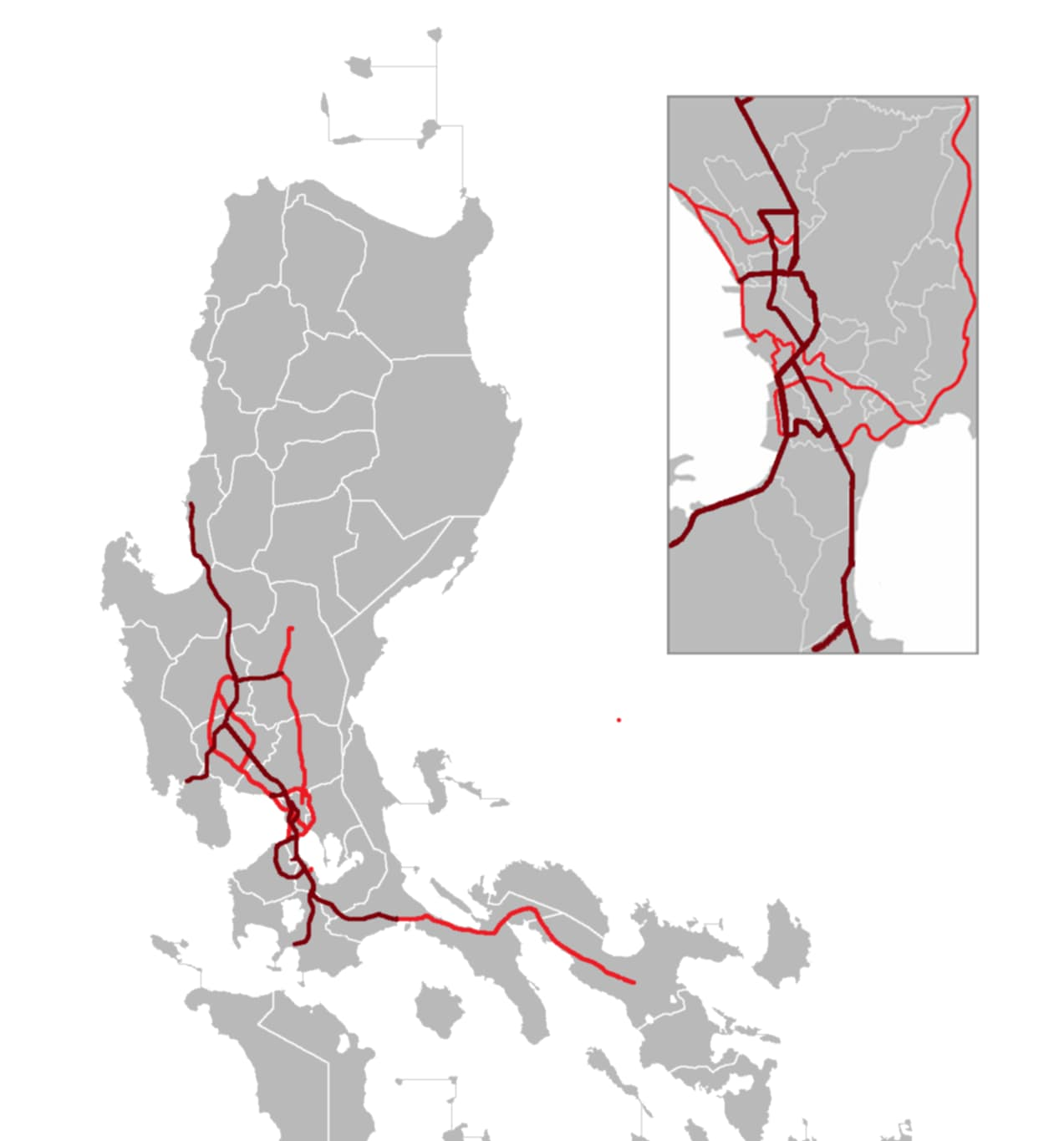
- Map of expressways in Luzon, maroon for built expressways and expressways under construction, red for proposed expressways

System information
- Maintained by private companies under concession from the Department of Public Works and Highways
- Length: 626 km (389 mi)
- Formed: 1968

Highway names
- Expressways: Ex

System links
- Roads in the Philippines; Highways; Expressways; List

The Philippine expressway network, also known as the High Standard Highway Network (HSH), is a controlled-access highway network managed by the Department of Public Works and Highways (DPWH) that consists of all expressways and regional high-standard highways in the Philippines.

High standard highways are defined as highways which provide a high level of traffic services by assuring high speed mobility and safe travel in order to vitally support socio-economic activities for sound socio-economic development of strategic regions and the country as a whole. In the Philippines, controlled-access highways are known as expressways. They are multi-lane divided toll roads which are privately maintained under concession from the government. The regional high standard highways are partial controlled-access highways that function as supplementary to expressways.

The Philippine expressway network spanned 420 kilometers (260 mi) in length in 2015 and was extended to 626 kilometers (389 mi) in 2020, and is to be extended to 995 kilometers (618 mi) beyond 2030 according to the master plan submitted by the Japan International Cooperation Agency (JICA) in 2010. In 2021, JICA updated their plans by proposing a master plan for the development of 4,400 kilometers of expressways (HSH).

== Overview ==
The Philippine highway network spans over 32,000 kilometers (20,000 mi) across all regions of the Philippines. These highways, however, are mostly single and dual carriageways with many U-turn lanes and intersections slowing down traffic. Coupled with the increase in the number of vehicles and the demand for limited-access highways, the Philippine government requested the government of Japan to conduct a master plan for the development of a high standard highway network in 2009 under the Philippine Medium-Term Public Investment Plan (2005–2010). The plan calls for the promotion of national integrity by strengthening the Philippine Nautical Highway System linking roads and ferries, the decongestion of traffic in Metro Manila, and the improvement of accessibility to main tourist spots, among others.

The Philippine expressway network master plan covers the development of high standard highways surrounding Metro Manila in Luzon, Metro Cebu in the Visayas, and the Metro Davao–General Santos area in Mindanao.

== Laws and restrictions ==
The establishment of limited-access highways or expressways are provided and defined by Republic Act No. 2000 or the Limited Access Highway Act, signed on June 22, 1957. Through the act, the Department of Public Works and Highways is authorized to designate new or existing roads as limited-access highways and to regulate points of entry along these limited-access highways.

Traffic laws on expressways are defined by the Limited Access Highway Act and Department of Public Works and Communications (DPWC) Administrative Order No. 1 series of 1968.

Standard traffic laws on all expressways based on the above laws include:

- Follow the rules and regulations of the Land Transportation and Traffic Code;
- Follow the minimum speed limit and maximum speed limit, except when on accelerating or deaccelerating lanes;
- Slow moving vehicles must stay on the right lane;
- When overtaking other vehicles, the left lane must be used as a passing lane;

While traveling along the expressway, vehicles are prohibited from:

- Entering or exiting an expressway into abutting lands or roads outside of designated access points;
- Driving a vehicle over or across the median strip;
- Making a left turn or u-turn except where explicitly allowed;
- Lane splitting, lane sharing, or lane filtering (including motorcycles);
- Stopping, loading, or unloading a vehicle outside of service areas;
- Making repairs to vehicles on travel lanes;
- Conducting or holding rallies, parades, funeral processions, and the like;

The following conveyances are prohibited on all expressways in the Philippines:

- Two-wheeled motorcycles with an engine displacement below 400 cubic centimeters (24 cu in);
- Three-wheeled motorcycles with an engine displacement below 600 cubic centimeters (37 cu in);
- Jaywalking, loitering, or travelling on foot;
- Riding or herding animals;
- Riding a bicycle, tricycle, pedicab, or any unmotorized vehicle;
- Driving any vehicle or equipment with an overall height exceeding 14 feet (4.3 m) or incapable of traveling at the minimum speed limit;
- Putting any stickers, posters, and tarpaulins within the expressway premises, including those used during elections;

== Types ==
High standard highways in the Philippines are classified into two types: the arterial high standard highways or expressways, and regional high standard highways.

=== Controlled-access highways or Expressways (HSH-1) ===
Arterial high standards highways (HSH-1) in the Philippines are known as expressways. They are highways with controlled-access, normally with interchanges and may include facilities for levying tolls for passage in an open or closed system. Standard features of Philippine expressways include guard rails, rumble strips, signs and pavement markings, solid wall fence, speed radars, toll plaza, closed-circuit television and rest and service areas. The speed limit is 100 km/h (62 mph) for cars and jeepneys, 80 km/h (50 mph) for trucks and buses, and 60 km/h (37 mph) is the minimum for all classes of vehicles.

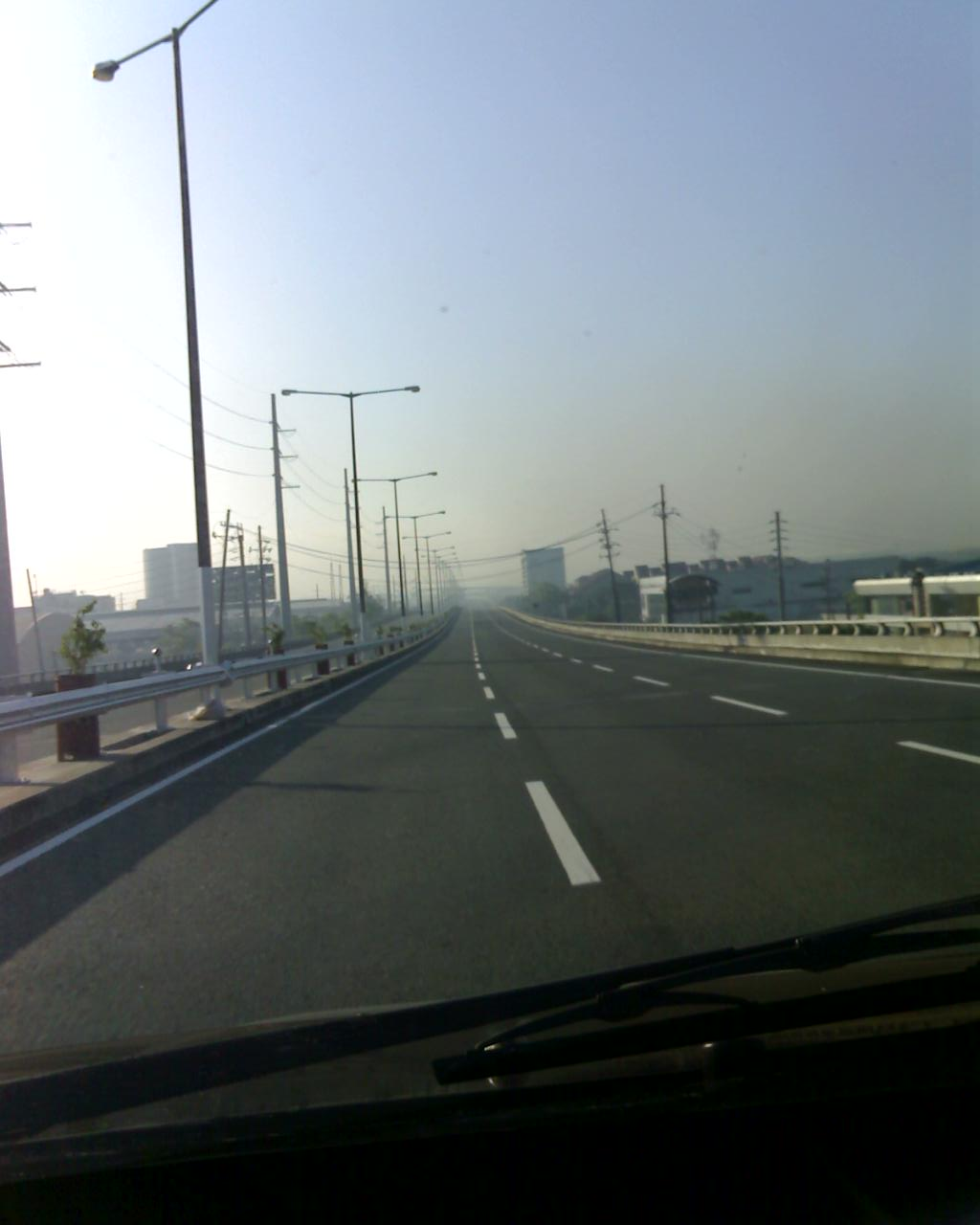
The Skyway, the first elevated toll road in the country, as pictured in 2007

The first expressways in the Philippines are the North Luzon Expressway (NLEX) and the South Luzon Expressway (SLEX), both of which were built in the late 1960s. The first elevated toll road in the Philippines is the Skyway, with its construction consisting of numerous sections called "stages". Its latest section, Stage 3, was completed in 2021. The Southern Tagalog Arterial Road (STAR) Tollway, from Santo Tomas to Lipa in Batangas was opened in 2001 and was extended in 2008. The Subic–Clark–Tarlac Expressway (SCTEX), the longest tollway in the Philippines was opened in 2008, setting the stage for the development of the Tarlac–Pangasinan–La Union Expressway (TPLEX), which would extend beyond the SCTEX' northern terminus in Tarlac City. The TPLEX was opened in 2013. The Cavite–Laguna Expressway (CALAX), another expressway in Southern Luzon, was partially opened on October 30, 2019. The Central Luzon Link Expressway (CLLEX) was partially opened on July 15, 2021.

There are many under construction and proposed expressways in the Philippines. All the expressways in the Philippines are privately maintained under concession agreements either with the Department of Public Works and Highways or the Toll Regulatory Board through build–operate–transfer (BOT) arrangements. At present, there are 15 expressways in the Philippines that connect Metro Manila to northern and southern Luzon and 1 expressway in Metro Cebu.

=== Regional high standard highways (HSH-2) ===
Regional high standard highways in the Philippines are multi-lane arterial roads with bypass, grade separation and/or frontage road. They connect the expressways and are mostly partial controlled-access highways. Their design speed is 80–100 km/h (50–62 mph) for inter-urban regional highways and 60 kilometers per hour (37 mph) for intra-urban highways.

== Numbering system ==
Under the implementation of a route numbering system commissioned by the Department of Public Works and Highways (DPWH) on 2014, expressways are signed with yellow pentagonal signs with black numerals. They are prefixed with the letter "E" for "Expressway" to distinguish them from national highways. Expressways numbers are assigned sequentially and continuously.

=== Numbered routes ===
The Philippine expressway network is currently consisting of six discontinuous network of expressways, all of which are located in the island of Luzon.

Image	Route	From	To	Length	Toll roads	Areas served	Notes
North Luzon Expressway	E1	Quezon City	Rosario, La Union	226 km (140 mi)	North Luzon Expressway; Subic–Clark–Tarlac Expressway (Mabalacat–Tarlac City segment); Tarlac–Pangasinan–La Union Expressway	Bulacan, La Union, northern Metro Manila, Nueva Ecija, Pampanga, Pangasinan, Tarlac	Includes the 3.36-kilometer (2.09 mi) NLEX Tabang Spur Road in Bulacan.
South Luzon Expressway	E2	Caloocan	Batangas City	103.7 km (64.4 mi)	South Luzon Expressway (Magallanes–Santo Tomas segment); Skyway (Note: The extent of E2/AH26 in Skyway is unknown since the DPWH's GIS apps does not show any route designation for the tollway. Despite this, some E2/AH26 markers were seen between Buendia and Alabang until they were dismantled together with the center barriers in 2020.); Southern Tagalog Arterial Road	Batangas, Cavite, Laguna, Metro Manila	
	E2	Muntinlupa		4 km (2.5 mi)	Muntinlupa–Cavite Expressway	Southern Metro Manila, Cavite	Spur of E2
	E2	Caloocan	Manila	7.7 km (4.8 mi)	NLEX Connector	Western Metro Manila	Operational (Caloocan to Magsaysay Boulevard); under construction (Magsaysay Boulevard to Santa Mesa)
	E3	Parañaque	Kawit, Cavite	14 km (8.7 mi)	Manila–Cavite Expressway	Cavite, southern Metro Manila	
	E3	Kawit, Cavite	Biñan	44.6 km (27.7 mi)	Cavite–Laguna Expressway	Cavite, Laguna	Partially operational (General Trias to Biñan)
Subic Freeport Expresway Subic–Clark–Tarlac Expressway	E4	Olongapo	Mabalacat	59.3 km (36.8 mi)	Subic–Clark–Tarlac Expressway (Dinalupihan–Mabalacat segment); Subic Freeport Expressway	Bataan, Pampanga, Zambales	
NLEX Segment 8.1 (Mindanao Avenue Link)	E5	Quezon City	Navotas	24.85 km (15.44 mi)	NLEX Harbor Link	Northern Metro Manila	Operational (Valenzuela to Navotas)
CAVITEX-C5 Link (C5 Southlink) Expressway (Merville Segment)	E5	Taguig	Parañaque/Las Piñas	7.7 km (4.8 mi)	CAVITEX–C-5 Link	Southern Metro Manila	
	E5	Quezon City	Taguig	34 km (21 mi)	Southeast Metro Manila Expressway	Rizal, eastern Metro Manila	Under construction
	E6	Parañaque	Taguig	11.6 km (7.2 mi)	NAIA Expressway	Southern Metro Manila, primarily Ninoy Aquino International Airport	

=== Unnumbered routes ===
Image	From	To	Length	Toll roads	Areas served	Notes
	Tarlac City	San Jose, Nueva Ecija	66.4 km (41.3 mi)	Central Luzon Link Expressway	Tarlac, Nueva Ecija	Partially operational (Tarlac City to Cabanatuan). The segment of the expressway in Tarlac is designated as N308 of the Philippine highway network.
	Cebu City	Cordova	8.9 km (5.5 mi)	Cebu–Cordova Link Expressway	Cebu City, Cordova	Longest bridge in the Philippines, first expressway outside Luzon and in the Visayas

== Tolls ==
Most of the expressways implement tolls, usually of the closed road and barrier toll systems. On expressways roads using closed road tolling, motorists first get a card or ticket at the entry point and surrender them upon exit. On expressways implementing barrier tolling, toll collection is done at toll plazas on a fixed rate. Some expressways employ a hybrid system that includes both, like the North Luzon Expressway, which uses both barrier ("open system") and closed road tolling.

Electronic toll collection (ETC) is first implemented on the Skyway and South Luzon Expressway, using transponder technology branded E-Pass. ETC systems are implemented by some toll road operators, with inter-running support on other connected expressways. Toll plazas or toll gates have ETC lanes on the leftmost lanes or on "mixed" lanes, that allow cash collection, or both. Latest ETC systems use radio frequency identification (RFID) technology over transponder technology for collection. Having different ETC systems that are not supported on other roads, a plan for a unified ETC system is promoted for motorists' convenience. Cashless toll collections on all expressways are on a dry run since 2023, aiming for full implementation in 2025. However, plans were changed.

In 2026, the government announced the start of a test for barrier-less system for expressways, and newly returned transportation secretary Vince Dizon said that the full implementation of barrier-less/multi-lane free flow (MLFF) program has become the national priority.

As of June 2024, the toll rates by expressway are as follows:

Name	Class 1 (Cars, Motorcycles, SUVs, Jeepneys)	Class 2 (Buses, Light Trucks)	Class 3 (Heavy Trucks)
Cavite–Laguna Expressway	₱4.656/km	₱9.368/km	₱14.023/km
CAVITEX–C-5 Link	₱35.00	₱69.00	₱104.00
Manila–Cavite Expressway	₱8.00 (Kabihasnan) ₱35.00 (Parañaque) ₱73.00 (Kawit)	₱70.00 (Parañaque) ₱146.00 (Kawit)	₱104.00 (Parañaque) ₱219.00 (Kawit)
Metro Manila Skyway	₱164.00 (to & from Alabang/SLEx) ₱118.00 (to & from Sucat/Dr. A. Santos Ave.) ₱72.00 (to & from Bicutan/Doña Soledad) ₱105.00 (Buendia to Plaza Azul/Nagtahan) ₱129.00 (E. Rodriguez to NLEX Balintawak) ₱264.00 (Buendia to NLEX Balintawak)	₱329.00 (to & from Alabang/SLEx) ₱237.00 (to & from Sucat/Dr. A. Santos Ave.) ₱145.00 (to & from Bicutan/Doña Soledad) ₱210.00 (Buendia to Plaza Azul/Nagtahan) ₱258.00 (E. Rodriguez to NLEX Balintawak) ₱528.00 (Buendia to NLEX Balintawak)	₱493.00 (to & from Alabang/SLEx) ₱356.00 (to & from Sucat/Dr. A. Santos Ave.) ₱218.00 (to & from Bicutan/Doña Soledad)
Muntinlupa–Cavite Expressway	₱18.00	₱37.00	₱55.00
NAIA Expressway	₱35.00 (Short Segment) ₱45.00 (Full Route)	₱69.00 (Short Segment) ₱90.00 (Full Route)	₱104.00 (Short Segment) ₱134.00 (Full Route)
NLEX Connector	₱86.00	₱215.00	₱302.00
North Luzon Expressway	₱74.00 [Open System (Balintawak–Marilao)] ₱4.27/km [Closed System (Bocaue–Sta.Ines)]	₱186.00 [Open System (Balintawak–Marilao)] ₱10.68/km [Closed System (Bocaue–Sta.Ines)]	₱223.00 [Open System (Balintawak–Marilao)] ₱12.81/km [Closed System (Bocaue–Sta.Ines)]
South Luzon Expressway	₱4.822/km	₱9.685/km	₱14.568/km
STAR Tollway	₱2.482/km	₱4.964/km	₱7.422/km
Subic–Clark–Tarlac Expressway	₱4.09/km	₱6.44/km	₱9.45/km
Subic Freeport Expressway	₱37.00	₱93.00	₱112.00
Tarlac–Pangasinan–La Union Expressway	₱3.50/km	₱8.70/km	₱10.50/km

Additionally, since June 1, 2024, the Agri-Trucks Toll Rebate Program is implemented to exempt vehicles carrying agricultural products from toll increases on expressways, aiming to ease inflation on these goods. For SMC Tollways-operated expressways such as SLEX and MCX, the average rebate ranges from ₱2 to ₱30. Meanwhile, Metro Pacific Tollways Corporation-operated expressways such as NLEX, SCTEX, and CAVITEX offer rebates ranging from ₱16 to ₱156. Both rates depend on the vehicle class, with the latter depending on the distance travelled as well.

== Luzon Spine Expressway Network ==
A component of the expressway network or the High Standard Highway Network is the Luzon Spine Expressway Network (LSEN). It is a planned network of interconnected expressways within the island of Luzon. It is part of the Build! Build! Build! Infrastructure Plan of DuterteNomics and the Build Better More of Bongbong Marcos.

In addition to the following expressways:

- Cavite–Laguna Expressway (CALAX)
- CAVITEX–C-5 Link
- Central Luzon Link Expressway (CLLEX)
- Manila–Cavite Expressway (CAVITEX)
- Muntinlupa–Cavite Expressway (MCX)
- NAIA Expressway (NAIAX)
- NLEX Connector
- NLEX Harbor Link
- North Luzon Expressway (NLEX)
- Skyway
- South Luzon Expressway (SLEX)
- Southern Tagalog Arterial Road (STAR Tollway)
- Subic Freeport Expressway (SFEX)
- Subic–Clark–Tarlac Expressway (SCTEX)
- Tarlac–Pangasinan–La Union Expressway (TPLEX)

New expressways will be built as well, such as:

- C-5 Expressway
- C-6 Expressway
- Calamba–Los Baños Expressway
- Camarines Sur Expressway
- Cavite–Batangas Expressway (CBEX)
- Cavite–Laguna Expressway (Kawit to Governor's Drive)
- CAVITEX–CALAX Link
- Central Luzon Link Expressway Phase 2
- Ilocos Norte-Ilocos Sur-Cordillera-Cagayan-Isabela Expressway (INISCCIEX)
- Laguna Lakeshore Expressway Dike (LLED)
- CAVITEX Segment 5 and Sangley Point Extension
- Manila–Quezon Expressway (MQEX)
- NAIA Expressway (BGC to Sales Interchange)
- Nasugbu–Bauan Expressway (NBEX)
- North Eastern Luzon Expressway (NELEX)
- NLEX Air
- NLEX Connector (Magsaysay to Sta. Mesa)
- NLEX Harbor Link Segment 8.2
- NLEX Phase 3
- North Luzon East Expressway (NLEE)
- Northern Access Link Expressway (NALEX)
- Ortigas Expressway
- Pangasinan Link Expressway (PLEX)
- Pasig River Expressway (PAREX)
- R-7 Expressway
- Skyway Stage 7
- SLEX Toll Road 4 and 5
- Southern Access Link Expressway (SALEX)
- Southeast Metro Manila Expressway (SEMME)
- Tanauan-Tagaytay Expressway
- Tarlac–Pangasinan–La Union Expressway Extension

== Asian Highway Network ==
The Asian Highway 26 passes through three expressways in the Philippines:

1. North Luzon Expressway from Guiguinto, Bulacan to Balintawak Interchange, Quezon City;
2. South Luzon Expressway from Magallanes Interchange, Makati to Calamba, Laguna; and
3. Skyway from Makati to Alabang.

== See also ==
- Philippine highway network
- List of expressways in the Philippines
- Transportation in the Philippines
- List of bridges in the Philippines
- Philippine Nautical Highway System
