= CAVITEX–C-5 Link =

Toll road in the Philippines

CAVITEX–C-5 Link
- C-5 Southlink Expressway
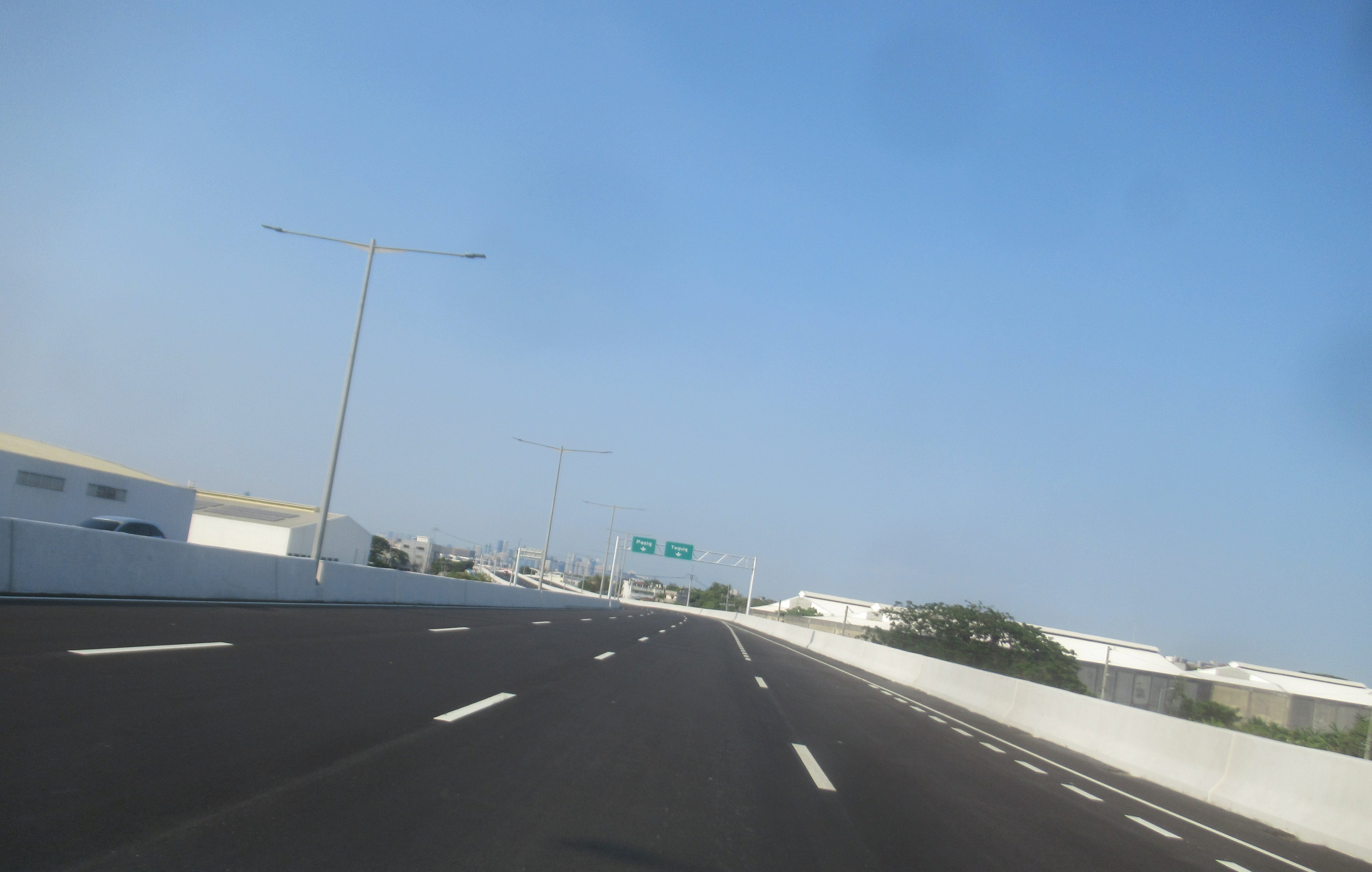
- The Segment 3B portion of the expressway near Merville, Parañaque

Route information
- Maintained by PEA Tollway Corporation and Cavitex Infrastructure Corporation
- Length: 7.708 km (4.790 mi)
- Existed: 2019–present
- Component highways: E5
- Restrictions: No motorcycles below 400cc

Major junctions
- East end: N11 (C.P. Garcia Avenue) in Taguig
- West end: E3 (Manila–Cavite Expressway) in Parañaque and Las Piñas

Location
- Country: Philippines
- Regions: Metro Manila
- Major cities: Taguig, Pasay, Parañaque, and Las Piñas

Highway system
- Roads in the Philippines; Highways; Expressways; List
← E4	→ E6

CAVITEX–C-5 Link, formerly the C-5 Southlink Expressway and signed as E5 of the Philippine expressway network, is a 7.708-kilometer (4.790-mile) controlled-access toll expressway in Metro Manila, connecting the Manila–Cavite Expressway (CAVITEX) at the Parañaque–Las Piñas boundary to Circumferential Road 5 (C-5) in Taguig. The project is being built at a cost of ₱15 billion. It is a joint project of the Philippine Reclamation Authority, Toll Regulatory Board, and Cavitex Infrastructure Corporation, a subsidiary of Metro Pacific Investments Corporation. It is also a part of the broader Circumferential Road 5 (C-5) network.

== Route description ==
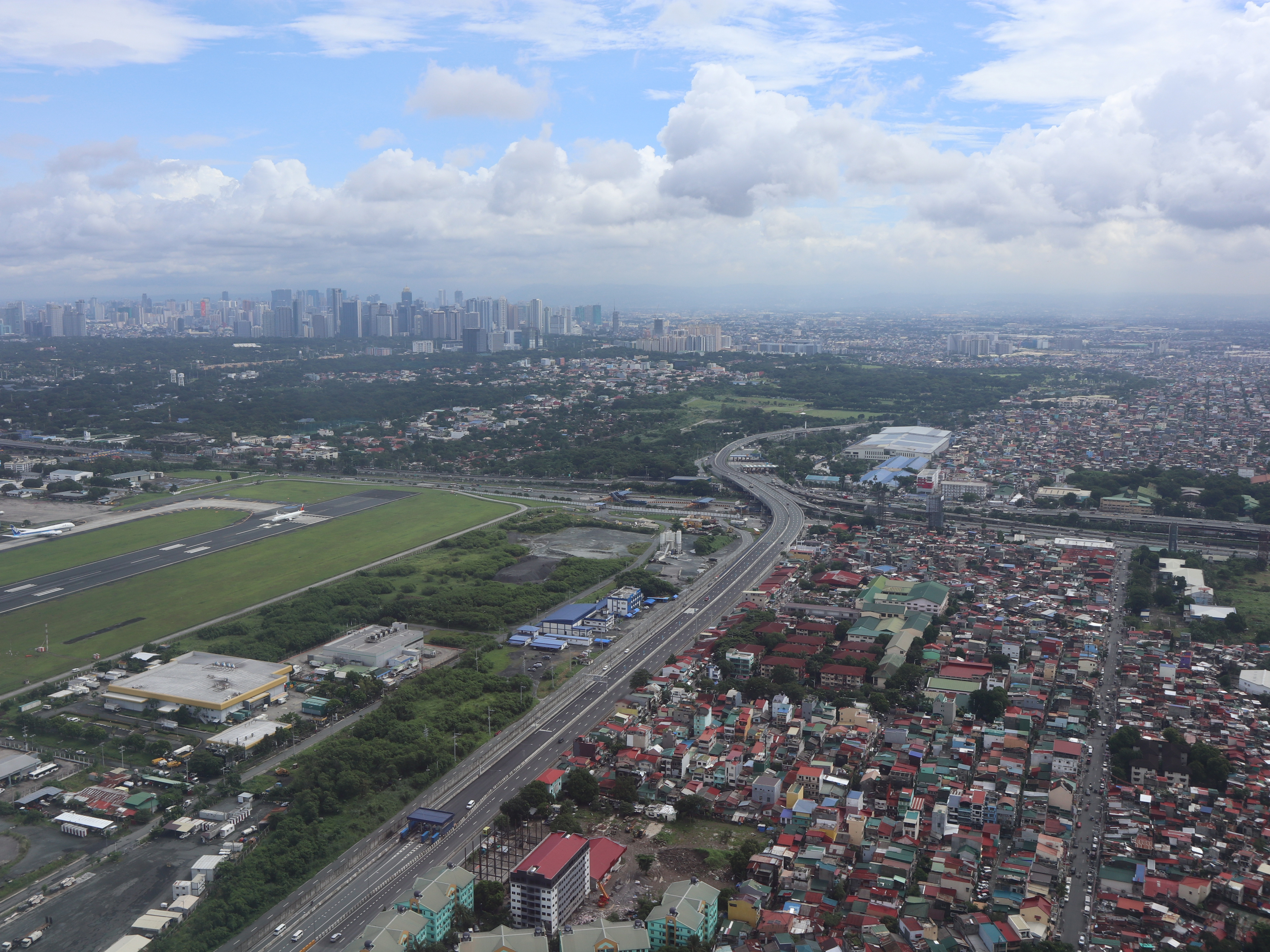
Aerial view of CAVITEX–C-5 Link in Pasay and Taguig

CAVITEX–C-5 Link starts at Carlos P. Garcia Avenue (C-5) in Taguig near its interchange with the South Luzon Expressway (SLEX). It then ascends as the existing flyover that crosses Skyway, the PNR Metro Commuter Line, SLEX and the at-grade expressway's service roads before descending along C-5 Extension, which serves as its frontage roads, in Pasay. It then continues its course south of Ninoy Aquino International Airport. It then passes by the Global Airport Business Park and Amvel City, where it meets its interchange towards Dr. Santos Avenue plus toll plaza located past the interchange. A flyover crosses Dr. Santos, the LRT-1 Cavite Extension, and Diego Cera Avenue. It ends at a trumpet interchange with CAVITEX near the latter's Parañaque toll plaza at the border between Parañaque and Las Piñas

Unlike most expressways in the Philippine expressway network, the maximum speed on its existing section is 60 kilometers per hour (37 mph).

== History ==
In 1993, the Japan International Cooperation Agency (JICA) conducted a study on the proposed urban expressway system in Metro Manila. The master plan included the proposed Central Circumferential Expressway that would follow the old Circumferential Road 5 alignment from Navotas to Parañaque with a total length of about 45.8 kilometers (28.5 mi).

On December 27, 1994, a Joint Venture Agreement between the Public Estates Authority (now called Philippine Reclamation Authority) and the Malaysian group of Majlis Amanah Rakyat (MARA) and Renong Berhad (Renong) was signed to develop the Manila–Cavite Toll Expressway Project (MCTEP). The project includes the original south extension of Circumferential Road 5, referred to as Segments 2 and 3. It was later approved by the Senate, and C-5's south extension has been made as a toll expressway. However, in 2010, the project was scrapped in favor of the toll-free C-5 Road Extension, which was controversial for traversing several of then-Senator Manny Villar's properties in Parañaque and Las Piñas. The toll expressway project was later revived as the C-5 Southlink Expressway project.

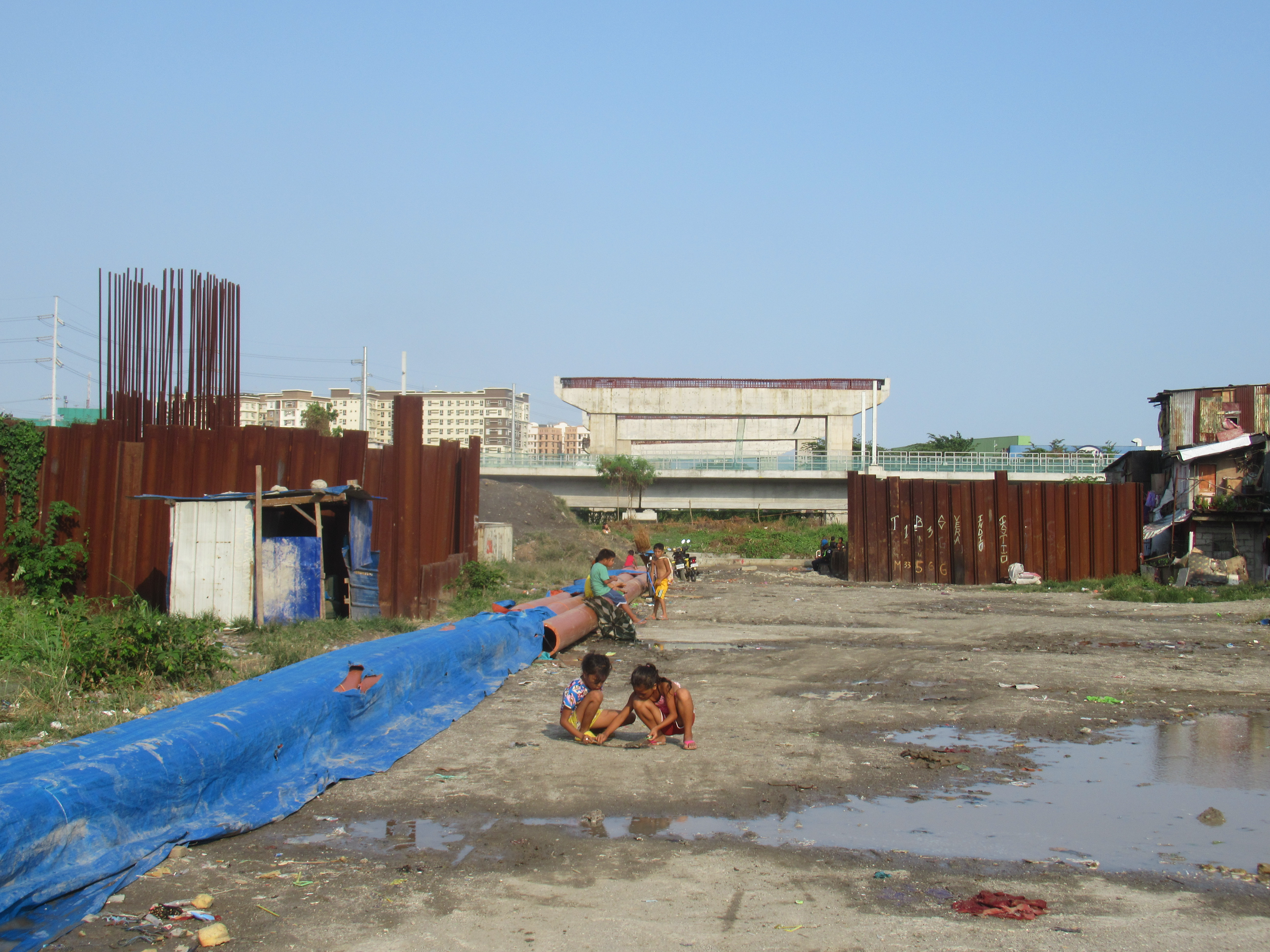
Segment 2 under construction in San Dionisio, Parañaque (April 2023)

Construction started on May 8, 2016. The expressway is being built in two phases. The first phase fills the gap between the C-5 main route and the C-5 Extension near Merville, Parañaque by constructing a 2.2-kilometer (1.4 mi) flyover over the South Luzon Expressway and Skyway. The second phase involves the construction of the Merville–R-1 segments.

Phase 1, or Section 3A-1 (C-5 to Merville), was opened to traffic on July 23, 2019. The 1.6-kilometer (0.99 mi) Segment 3A-2 (Merville to E. Rodriguez) opened on August 14, 2022, with the Merville Exit opening later on October 25.

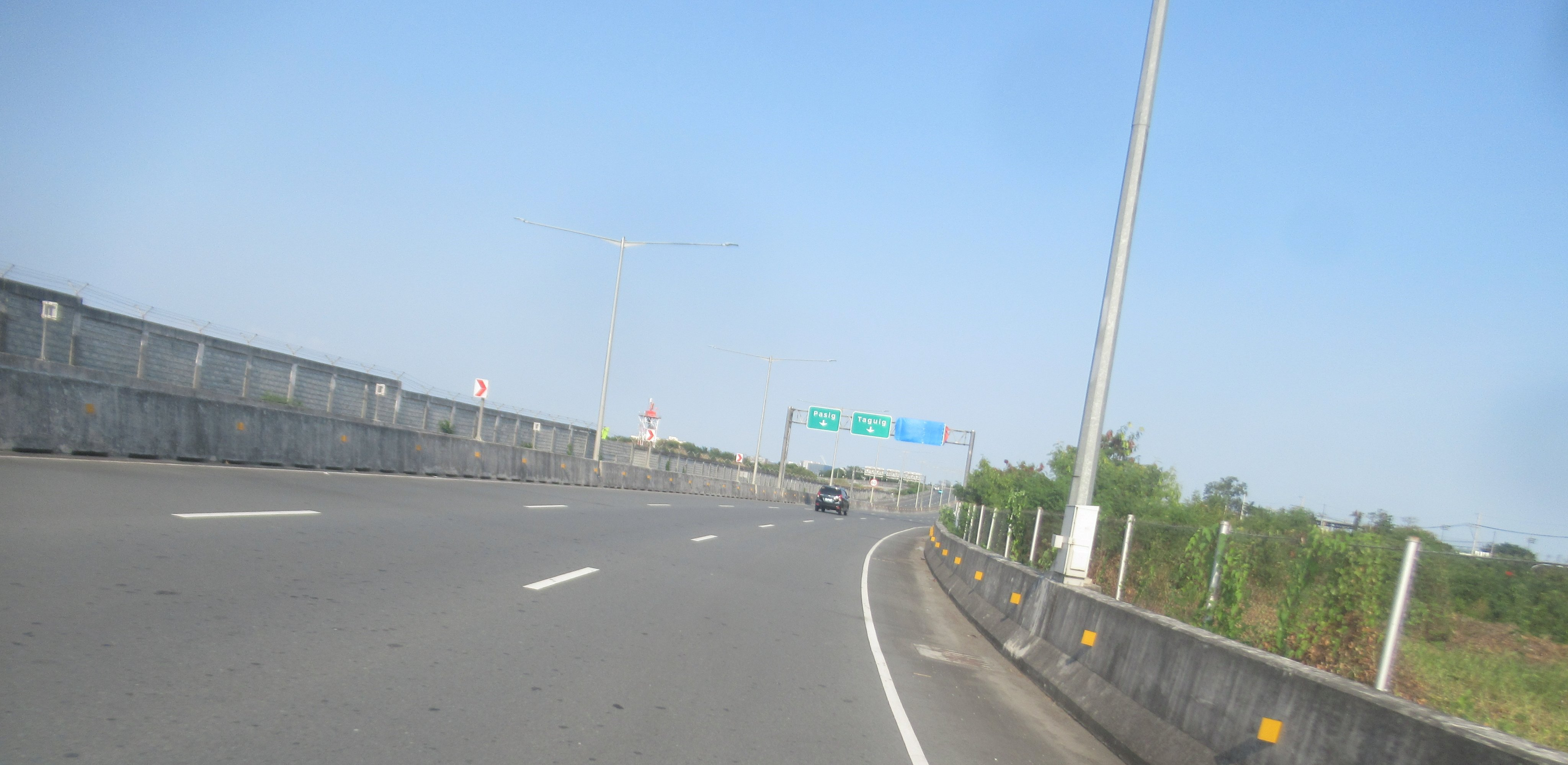
Segment 3B, opened in 2026, bridges the gap between the Merville and Parañaque (Sucat) interchanges.

On June 23, 2024, the expressway's 1.9-kilometer (1.2 mi) Segment 2, which runs from CAVITEX to Parañaque (Sucat) interchanges, was opened to traffic. The latter interchange is, however, independent from the existing 3.8-kilometer (2.4 mi) section from C-5 to Barangay Santo Niño in Parañaque. Toll collection on Segment 2 began on September 23, 2024. The 2-kilometer (1.2 mi) Segment 3B broke ground two days earlier, and was opened on March 30, 2026, completing the missing link.

=== Kaingin Service Road ===
In November 2024, the newly inaugurated CAVITEX Infrastructure Corporation's Kaingin Service Road (near the near the Ninoy Aquino International Airport perimeter fence) connects Multinational Avenue to the CAVITEX C5 Link Flyover Extension-Merville-C5.

== Toll ==
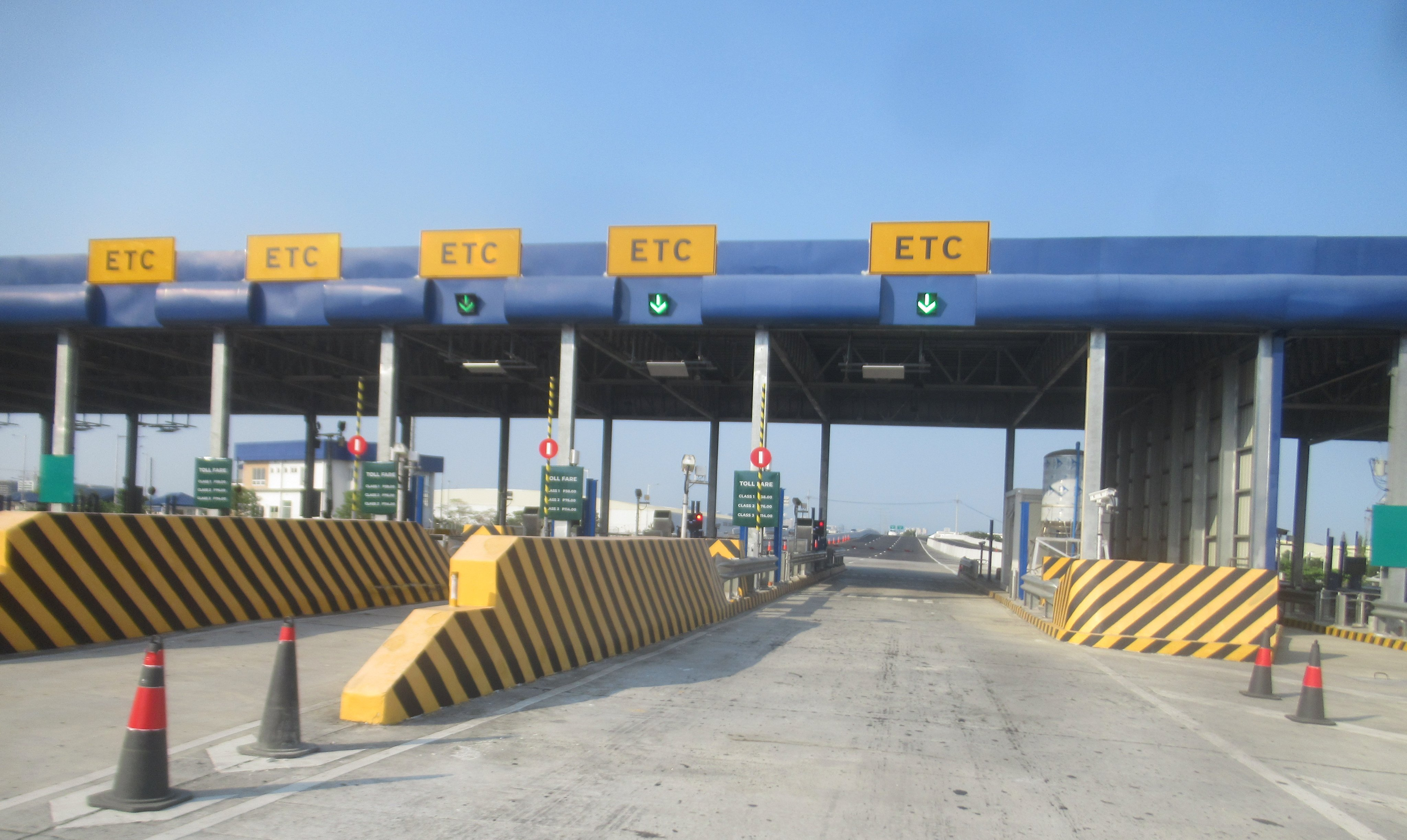
Sucat Toll Plaza

Integrated with the toll system of CAVITEX, the expressway utilizes a barrier toll system where motorists pay a flat rate at each designated plaza: the Taguig and Merville plazas charge a fixed fee upon exit from that segment, while separate rates are collected at the Sucat toll plaza or this expressway's Parañaque Exit, with the latter serving as the collection point for motorists moving between the link and the CAVITEX mainline. Segment 3B, which runs between the Sucat and Merville exits, remains toll-free until further notice.

The expressway fully implements an electronic toll collection (ETC) system, which is operated by Easytrip Services Corporation.

Tolls are assessed in each direction at each barrier, based on class. In accordance with the law, all toll rates include a 12% value-added tax.

Class	Toll	
Class	Taguig–Merville	Sucat–CAVITEX (Segment 2)
Class 1 (Cars, motorcycles, SUVs, Jeepneys)	₱35.00	₱38.00
Class 2 (Buses, light trucks)	₱69.00	₱76.00
Class 3 (Heavy trucks)	₱104.00	₱114.00

== Exits ==
This entire route is located in Metro Manila. Exits will be numbered by kilometer posts, with Rizal Park in Manila designated as kilometer zero.

Province	City/Municipality	km	mi	Exit	Name	Destinations	Notes
Taguig					Taguig	N11 (C.P. Garcia Avenue) – Taguig, Pasig, Pateros	Eastbound exit and westbound entrance; eastern terminus
Taguig				Taguig Toll Plaza (eastbound only)			
Pasay					SLEX	AH26 (SLEX) – Manila	Proposed eastbound exit and westbound entrance
Pasay				Merville Toll Plaza (westbound only)			
Pasay						C-5 Road Extension	Former western terminus (2019–2022)
Pasay					Merville	C-5 Road Extension	Westbound exit and eastbound entrance
Parañaque						C-5 Road Extension	Westbound exit and eastbound entrance; former western terminus (2022–2024)
Parañaque					Parañaque (Sucat)	N195 (Ninoy Aquino Avenue) / Victor Medina Street / C-5 Extension – NAIA Terminals 1 and 2, Sucat	Folded diamond interchange
Parañaque				Sucat Toll Plaza			
Parañaque					R-1 (CAVITEX)	E3 (CAVITEX) – Bacoor, Las Piñas, Kawit, Manila, Pasay	Western terminus; trumpet interchange
1.000 mi = 1.609 km; 1.000 km = 0.621 mi: Closed/former; Incomplete access; Tolled; Unopened

== See also ==
- NLEX Harbor Link
- Southeast Metro Manila Expressway
