= EEI Corporation =

Filipino construction and real estate company

- Type: Public
- Traded as: PSE: EEI
- Industry: Construction, Real estate
- Founded: April 17, 1931; 95 years ago
- Headquarters: RCBC Plaza, Makati, Metro Manila
- Key people: Henry Antonio (President and CEO); Lorenzo Tan (Chairman)
- Website: www.eei.com.ph

EEI Corporation is a construction and real estate company based in the Philippines.

== History ==
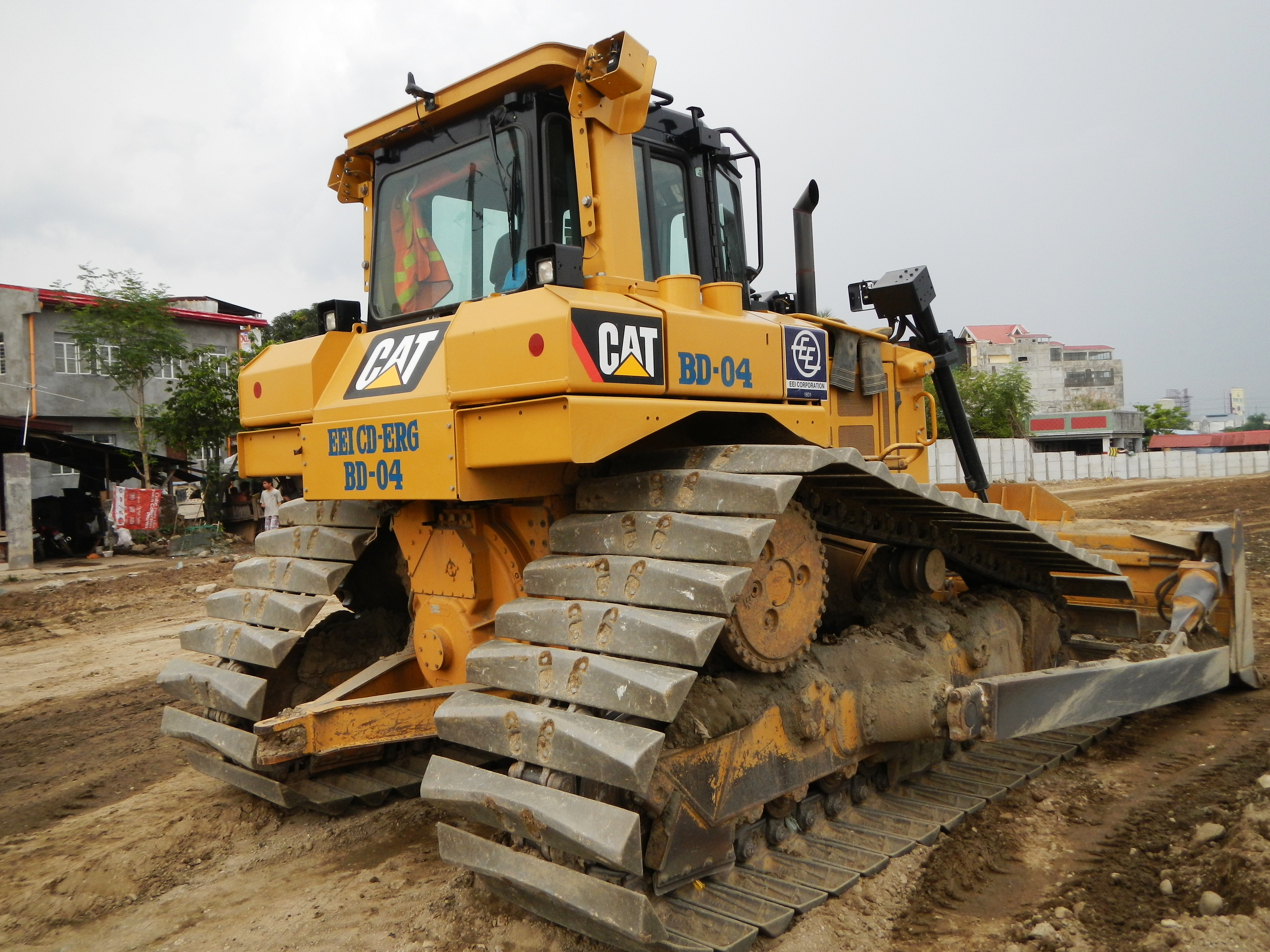
A Caterpillar D6 of EEI Corporation

The EEI Corporation was established on April 17, 1931, as a machinery and mills supply house called Engineering Equipment and Supply Co. (EESCO). EEI later divesified into steel fabrication, metal works, general machine work and other services.

In the 1970s, it established an overseas division which led to it partnering with firms in Southeast Asia, the Middle East and North Africa, and New Caledonia.

EEI was first listed at the Manila Stock Exchange and Makati Stock Exchange (later merged as the Philippine Stock Exchange) on July 21, 1975.

The Yuchengco Group's House of Investment (HI) in 2023 reduced its stakes in the EEI, selling 20 percent to RYM Business Management Corporation, a firm which is associated to Martin Romualdez. HI's stakes remains at 35.3 percent after the sale. RYM's shares was bought by another company controlled by Henry Antonio, EEI's president and CEO, in March 2025.

In August 2025, EEI announced plans to enter the real estate industry. They intend to develop townships and condominiums in Luzon.

== Major projects ==
- Metro Manila Subway – 7.3 km (4.5 mi)
- Philippine International Exhibition Center
- MRT Line 3
- MRT Line 7
- Malolos–Clark Railway (Package 4; with Acciona)
- South Commuter Railway (Package 7)
- NAIA Expressway (Phase 1)
- Skyway Stage 3
- Cavite–Laguna Expressway (Subsection 1)
- CAVITEX–CALAX Link

== See also ==
- DMCI Homes
