= Island Cove =

Island Cove may refer to:

- Lower Island Cove, Newfoundland and Labrador, Canada
- Upper Island Cove, Newfoundland and Labrador, Canada
- Island Cove (Cavite), Calabarzon, Philippines

== See also ==
- Cove Island
