= Pacific Avenue Flyover =

Flyover in Metro Manila, Philippines

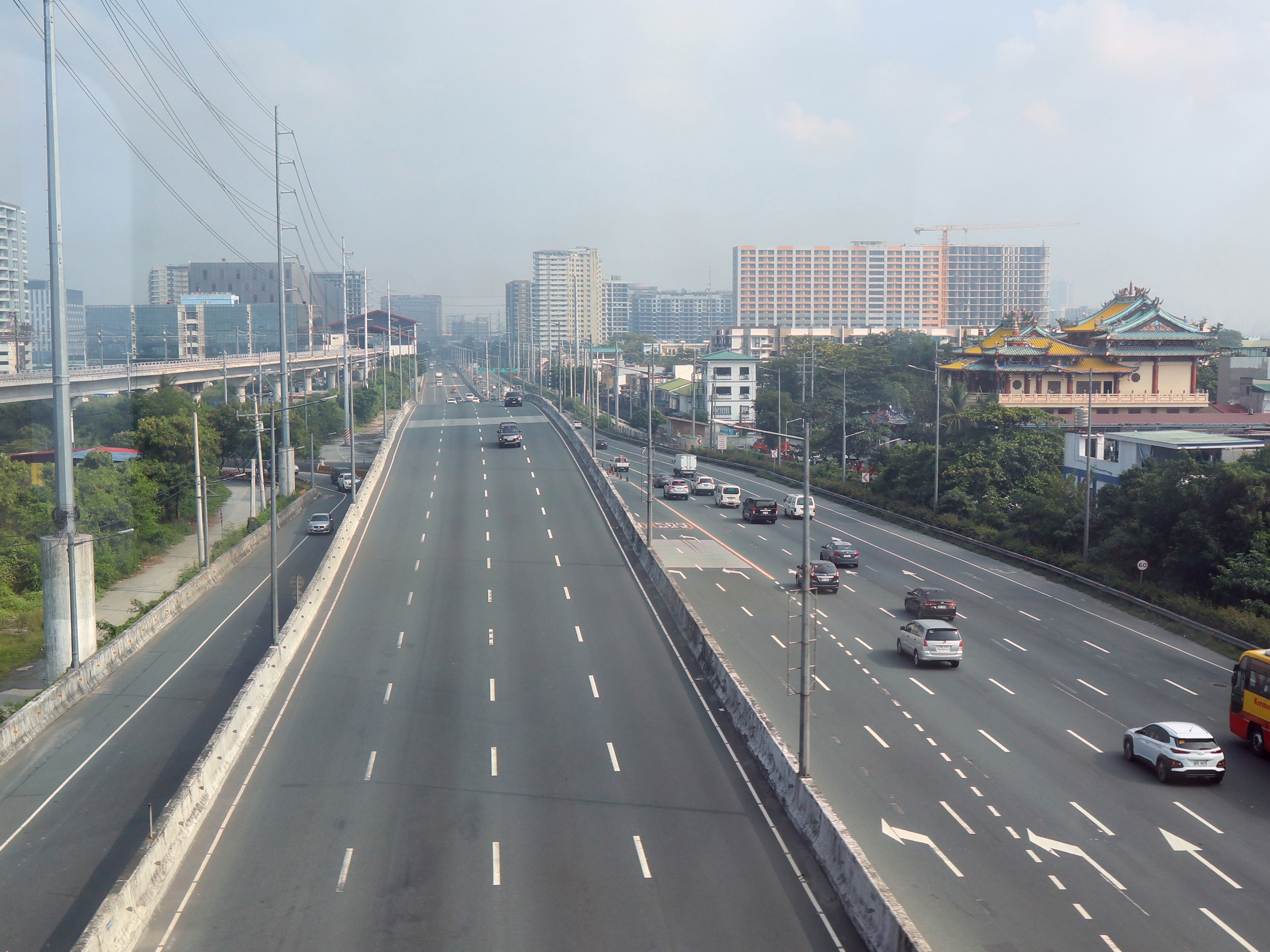
- The Pacific Avenue Flyover
- Coordinates: 14°30′16.4″N 120°59′25.8″E
- Carries: Motor vehicles (Southbound traffic only)
- Crosses: Junction of CAVITEX and Pacific Avenue
- Locale: Parañaque, Metro Manila, Philippines
- Owner: Philippine Reclamation Authority (PRA) and Cavitex Infrastructure Corporation (CIC), a subsidiary of Metro Pacific Tollways Corporation (MPTC).
- Maintained by: Public Estates Authority Tollway Corporation (PEATC); CIC

Characteristics
- Design: Concrete girder flyover
- Material: Concrete, steel
- Total length: 220 m (720 ft)
- No. of lanes: 4

History
- Built: 2018
- Opened: August 4, 2018 (Partial opening); December 18, 2018 (Full operation)

Location
- Interactive map of Pacific Avenue Flyover

The Pacific Avenue Flyover is a 220-meter (720 ft), four-lane grade-separated concrete vehicular flyover along the Manila–Cavite Expressway (CAVITEX) in Parañaque, Metro Manila, Philippines. Situated near the northern terminus of CAVITEX, the flyover bypasses the signalized intersection at Pacific Avenue, facilitating smooth southbound traffic flow from Roxas Boulevard and NAIA Expressway heading toward Cavite.

== Background and history ==
Prior to the construction of the flyover, the intersection of CAVITEX and Pacific Avenue (which serves as an access road toward Asia World, Parañaque Integrated Terminal Exchange, and Aseana City) operated as an at-grade, signalized junction with traffic stoplights. According to the MPTC, the stop light and the stop-and-go scheme was one of the main reasons for the heavy traffic in CAVITEX.

In 2018, the Department of Public Works and Highways (DPWH) in partnership with concessionaire Cavite Infrastructure Corporation (CIC), a subsidiary of MPTC, initiated an ₱800-million CAVITEX enhancement program, which included the construction of the Pacific Avenue Flyover.

=== Opening ===
On August 4, 2018, CIC partially opened two lanes of the flyover to ease congestion ahead of full completion.

On December 18, 2018, DPWH Secretary Mark Villar and MPTC officials led the formal commissioning and full opening of the southbound flyover.

== Route description ==
The Pacific Avenue Flyover strictly carries only southbound through-traffic bound for Cavite.

For vehicles southbound continuing straight toward Cavite uses the Pacific Avenue Flyover to bypass the intersection entirely. All northbound traffic, continuing straight towards Roxas Boulevard remains at ground level of the expressway. Vehicles northbound heading into Pacific Avenue use the designated left-turn lane to turn left beneath the flyover structure.

Traffic exiting Pacific Avenue onto CAVITEX is restricted to right turns only, merging into the southbound lanes heading toward Cavite. Direct left turns from Pacific Avenue onto northbound CAVITEX (Roxas Boulevard-bound) are prohibited at the junction.

== See also ==
- Manila–Cavite Expressway
- Parañaque Integrated Terminal Exchange
- Roxas Boulevard
