= Tirona Highway =

Major highway in the province of Cavite, Philippines

Tirona Highway

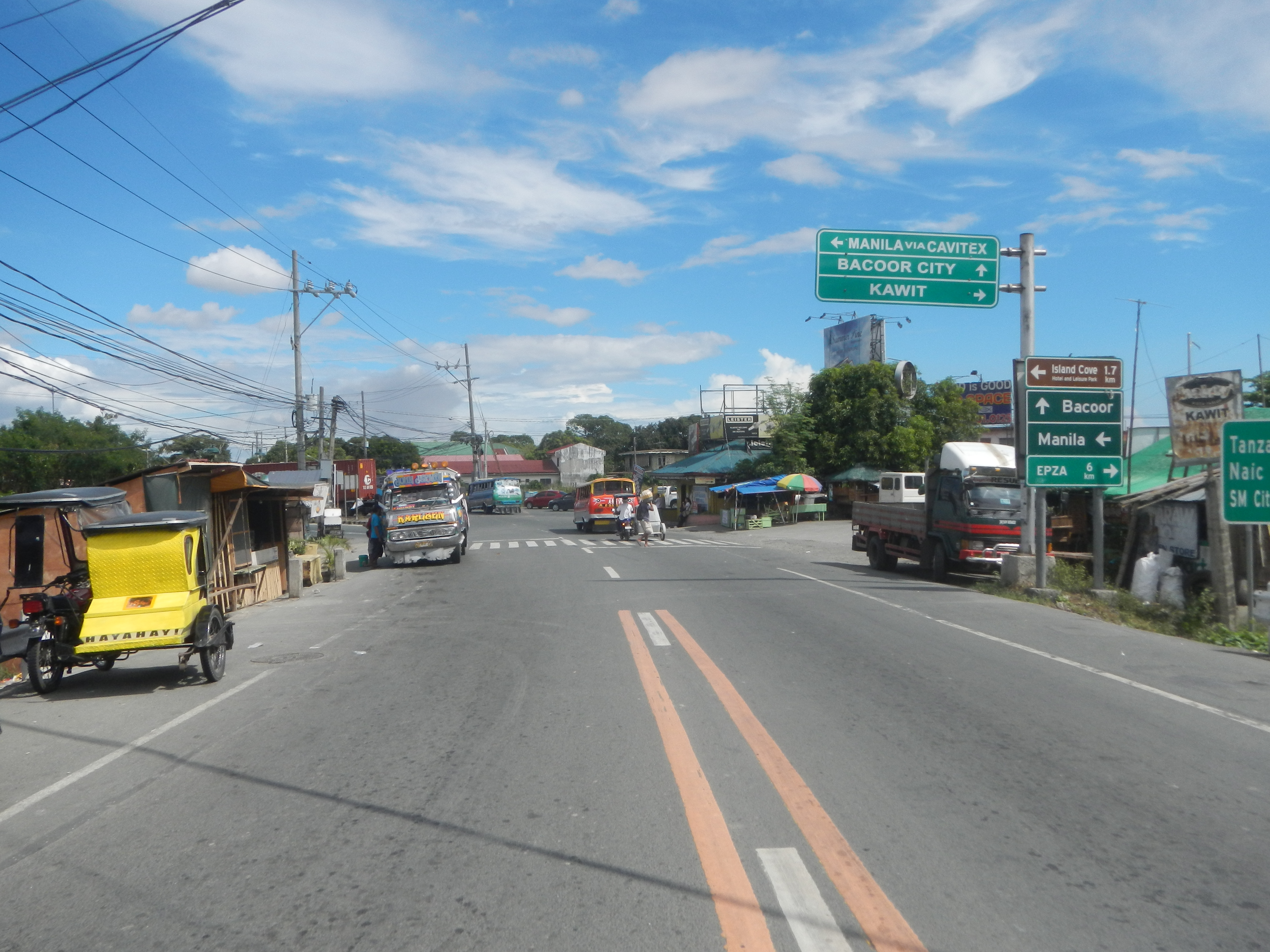
- Tirona Highway in Binakayan, Kawit, Cavite

Route information
- Maintained by Department of Public Works and Highways (DPWH) - Cavite District Engineering Office
- Component highways: N62

Major junctions
- East end: N62 / N419 (Aguinaldo Highway) in Bacoor
- N64 (Antero Soriano Highway); E3 (Manila–Cavite Expressway)
- West end: N62 (Magdiwang Highway) / Gregorio Street in Kawit

Location
- Country: Philippines
- Provinces: Cavite
- Major cities: Bacoor
- Towns: Kawit

Highway system
- Roads in the Philippines; Highways; Expressways; List

The Tirona Highway is a two-to-four lane, primary highway in Cavite, Philippines. It connects the city of Bacoor and the municipality of Kawit. It was named for Filipino revolutionary leader Daniel Tirona. The Aguinaldo Shrine, the site of the Philippine Declaration of Independence and residence of Emilio Aguinaldo, is located along the road.

The road forms part of National Route 62 (N62) of the Philippine highway network.
