= R-7 Expressway (Philippines) =

Road in the Philippines

Route information
- Length: 10.2 km (6.3 mi)

Major junctions
- South end: Manila
- Metro Manila Skyway Stage 3
- North end: N170 (Commonwealth Avenue)

Location
- Country: Philippines
- Regions: Metro Manila
- Major cities: Quezon City

Highway system
- Roads in the Philippines; Highways; Expressways; List

The R-7 Expressway is a proposed expressway in Quezon City, Metro Manila, Philippines. Originally proposed in 1993, the project will be constructed over the most heavily congested corridors in Metro Manila, namely Quezon Avenue and Commonwealth Avenue.

== Route ==
=== 1993 JICA study ===
In 1993, the Japan International Cooperation Agency (JICA) performed a study on urban expressways in Metro Manila, which included the R-7 route extending from C-3 to Batasan, covering a distance of approximately 12.3 kilometers (7.6 mi) and utilizing a combination of elevated, tunnel, and at-grade sections.

=== 1999 MMUTIS proposal ===
In 1999, JICA proposed the construction of a 13.5-kilometer (8.4 mi) six-lane elevated expressway along Quezon Avenue. In the Metro Manila Urban Transport Integrated Study proposal, it will be extended toward the east and connected to C-6 to serve traffic demand between Manila CBD and Marikina. The plan was also to include a design that would parallel with the then-proposed 1990s plan of the LRT Line 4 (planned by the French consortium since 1995), according to the designs.

=== 2010 proposal ===
The alignment was to have 16.1 kilometers (10.0 mi) of route, and the project will be constructed over one of the most heavily congested corridors in Metro Manila, namely Quezon Avenue and Don Mariano Marcos Avenue. It will be partially elevated and partially underground expressway. The expressway will connect Quezon City and Manila with a high-speed transport facility, thus decongesting traffic on at-grade roads. The project is believed to cost PhP 23.980 billion (US$532.89 million). However, the project was not included in the priority projects list under the administration of Benigno Aquino III.

=== 2014 and 2019 JICA studies ===
In 2014, under the Roadmap for Transport Infrastructure Development for Metro Manila and Its Surrounding Areas (Region III & Region IV-A; also known as the Metro Manila Dream Plan), the JICA study proposes a dual 2-lane elevated expressway with a length of 10.2 kilometers (6.3 mi) between Manila and Tandang Sora Avenue. A proposal was mentioned again in the 2019 follow-up report.

== See also ==
- Radial Road 7
