= Lane sharing =

Road usage practice involving multiple transportation types

Lane sharing is the use of a single lane by multiple types of transportation. It is commonly used to describe cyclists and motorists sharing a lane, where no dedicated bike lane is present.

Lanes are sometimes shared between bicycles and motor vehicles at intersections; when a bike lane is on the side of a road, turning vehicles may use the bike lane in addition to cyclists.

When lane sharing is done by using space between lines of traffic, it is called lane splitting. This is legal in some areas at intersections, where motorcycle users may use the spaces between cars to queue at a red light.

== Types ==
=== Trams and road traffic ===
Trams sometimes share lanes with road traffic, including cars, trucks, buses, and cyclists. Trams may have special rules giving them the right of way in such situations. Shared lanes which include both trams and cyclists may pose a hazard for the latter, due to the rails in the roadway. Where trams share lanes with motor vehicles, traffic lights are often modified to accommodate them.

Dedicated lanes can be used for buses and trams, excluding cars. By separating both buses and trams from private vehicles, both forms of public transportation can handle increased frequency with better reliability.
