= E3 expressway (Philippines) =

Philippine Expressway

Expressway 3

Route information
- Maintained by PEA Tollway Corporation and Metro Pacific Tollways Corporation
- Length: 59.93 km (37.24 mi)
- Existed: 2014–present

Main section
- North end: N61 (Roxas Boulevard) / N194 (NAIA Road/Seaside Drive) in Parañaque
- Major intersections: E6 (NAIA Expressway) in Parañaque; E5 (CAVITEX–C-5 Link) in Parañaque/Las Piñas; N62 (Aguinaldo Boulevard) / N411 (Alabang–Zapote Road) in Bacoor; N62 (Tirona Highway) / N64 (Antero Soriano Highway) / Covelandia Road in Kawit, Cavite; N65 (Governor's Drive) in General Trias; N410 (Aguinaldo Highway) in Silang; N420 (Santa Rosa–Tagaytay Road) in Santa Rosa, Laguna
- South end: AH26 (South Luzon Expressway) / Greenfield Parkway / LIIP Avenue in Biñan

Location
- Country: Philippines
- Regions: Metro Manila, Calabarzon

Highway system
- Roads in the Philippines; Highways; Expressways; List
← E2	→ E4

Expressway 3 (E3) forms a part of the Philippine expressway network. Its main route runs from Parañaque to Kawit, Cavite as the Manila–Cavite Expressway and from Kawit, Cavite to Biñan, Laguna as the Cavite–Laguna Expressway.

== Route description ==
=== Main route ===
==== Manila–Cavite Expressway ====
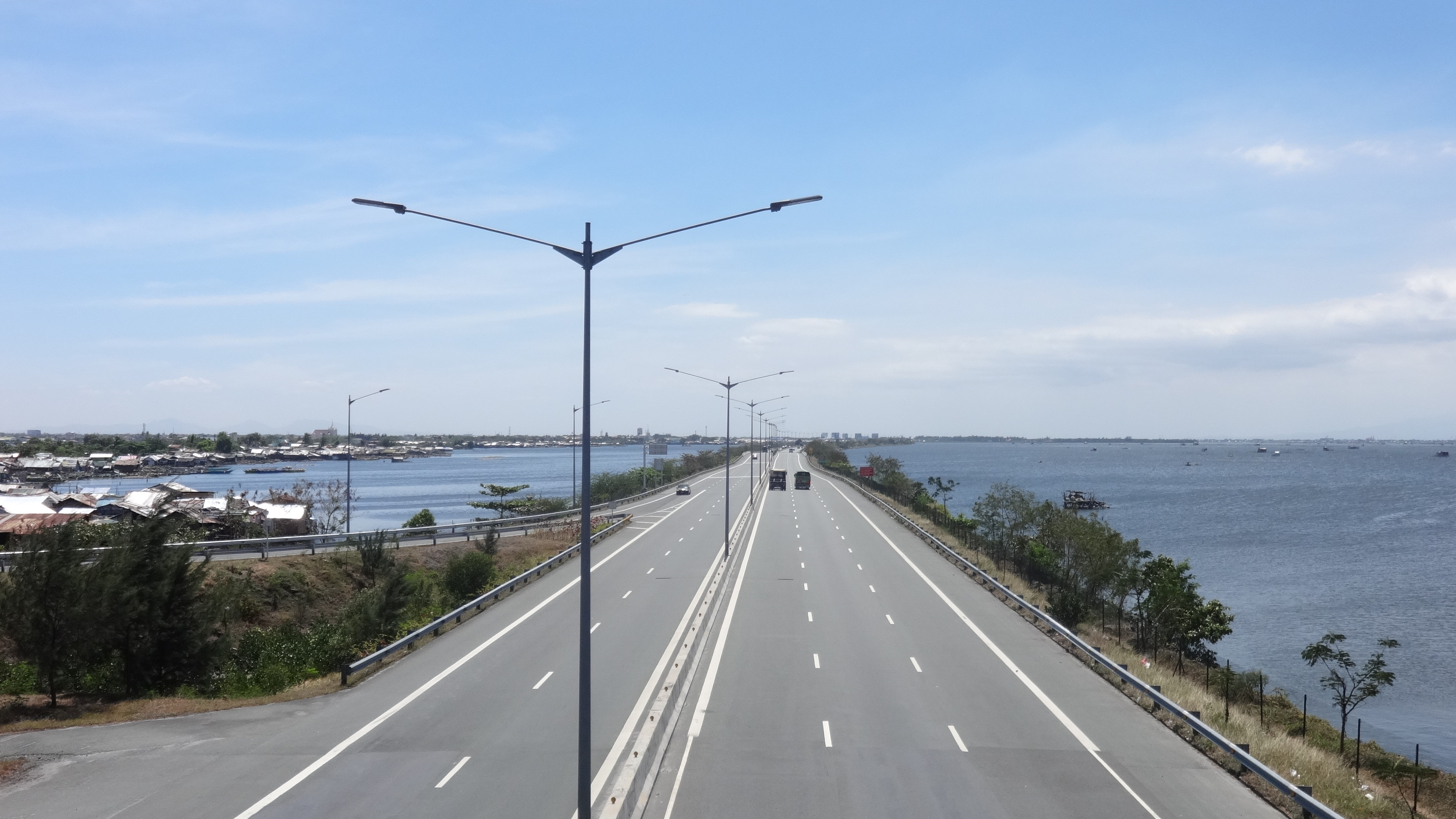
E3 as CAVITEX in Bacoor

E3 starts as a continuation of Roxas Boulevard southwards from its intersection with NAIA Road and Seaside Drive in Parañaque as the Manila–Cavite Expressway. It parallels Quirino Avenue in Parañaque, which continues as Diego Cera Avenue in Las Piñas. It continues further south as Aguinaldo Highway when it enters the Province of Cavite. It continues until it reaches Kawit, where it ends and becomes the Cavite–Laguna Expressway on the elevated CAVITEX–CALAX Link.

==== Cavite–Laguna Expressway ====
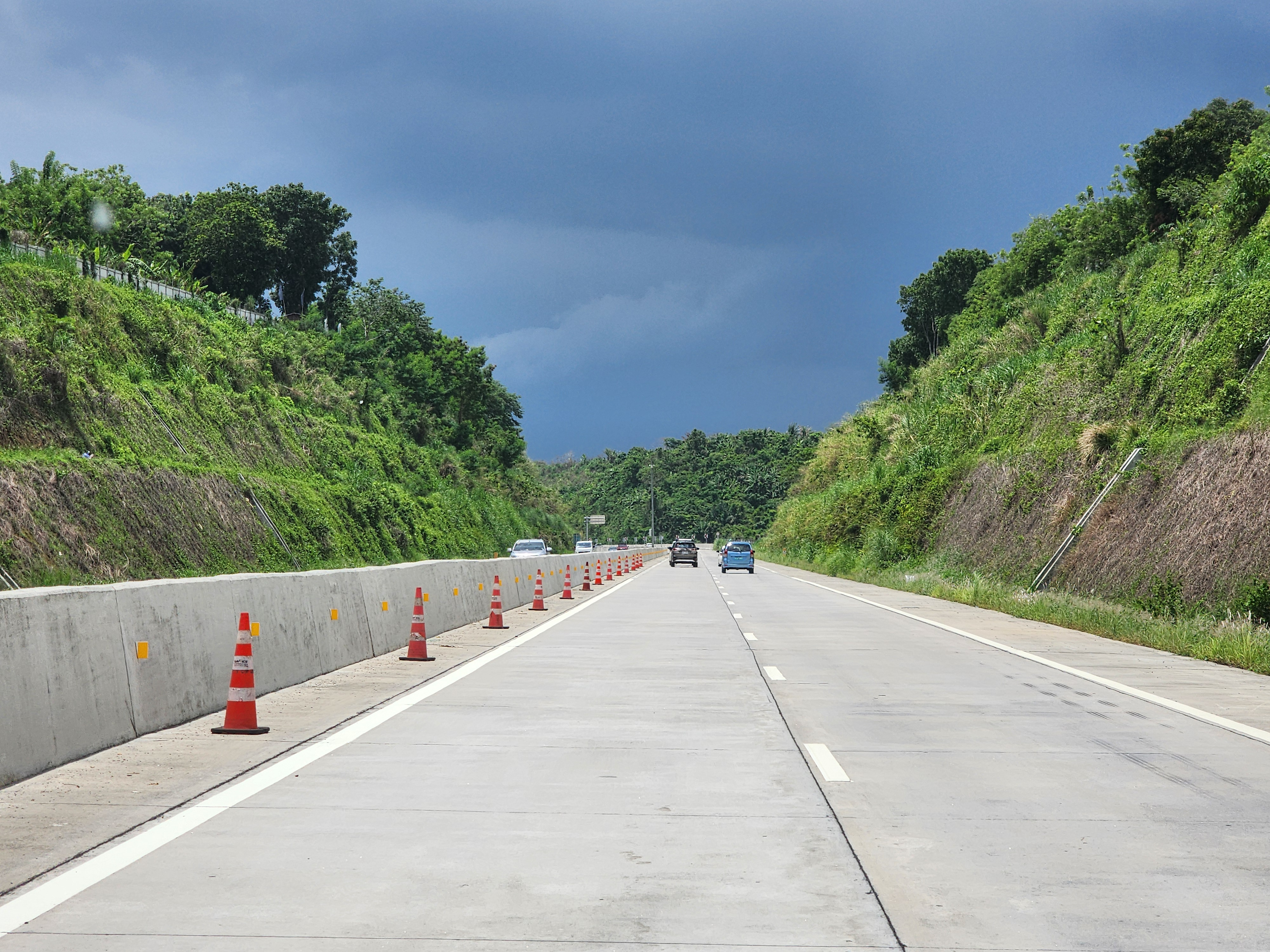
E3 as CALAX in Silang

E3 continues as Cavite–Laguna Expressway at Kawit Exit, an interchange with Tirona Highway (N62), Antero Soriano Highway (N64) and CAVITEX in Kawit, Cavite. It traverses from Kawit, Cavite, continuing its parallel run to the Aguinaldo Highway until Silang Exit, to which then it turns to run parallel to Governor's Drive up until its other end in Biñan, Laguna, where it ends at Greenfield Circle, a roundabout with the Mamplasan Exit of the South Luzon Expressway (E2), Greenfield Parkway, and LIIP Avenue.

== Exits ==
Exit numbers are based on kilometer posts, with Rizal Park in Manila designated as Kilometre Zero.

Region	Province	City/Municipality	km	mi	Exit	Name	Destinations	Notes
Metro Manila	Parañaque		7.50	4.66		Roxas Boulevard	N61 (Roxas Boulevard) / N194 (NAIA Road)	Northern terminus of CAVITEX (E3); at-grade continuation into Roxas Boulevard
Metro Manila	Parañaque		9.20	5.72		NAIAX Interchange	E6 (NAIA Expressway) – NAIA Terminals 1, 2, 3	Direct elevated connection to NAIAX (E6)
Metro Manila	Parañaque		10.00	6.21	Parañaque Toll Plaza			
Metro Manila	Las Piñas		13.20	8.20		Las Piñas	N62 (Alabang–Zapote Road) / Diego Cera Avenue	Ramps serving Las Piñas and Zapote
Metro Manila	Las Piñas		14.80	9.20		Zapote	N62 (Aguinaldo Highway)	Southbound off-ramp, northbound on-ramp
Metro Manila	Las Piñas		15.50	9.63		Zapote River Bridge		Metro Manila – Cavite boundary
Calabarzon	Cavite	Bacoor	16.80	10.44		Longos / Bacoor	N62 (Aguinaldo Highway) / Tirona Highway	At-grade signalized interchange serving Bacoor City
Calabarzon	Cavite	Bacoor	18.50	11.50	Kawit Toll Plaza			
Calabarzon	Cavite	Bacoor	21.00	13.05		Kawit	N62 (Centennial Road) / Antero Soriano Highway	Ramps serving Kawit and Noveleta
Calabarzon	Cavite	Imus	24.50	15.22	Cavite–Laguna Expressway			
Calabarzon	Cavite	General Trias	28.00	17.40		Open Canal	Open Canal Road / Arnaldo Highway	Diamond interchange
Calabarzon	Cavite	General Trias	32.50	20.19		Governor's Drive	N65 (Governor's Drive)	Diamond interchange serving General Trias and Trece Martires
Calabarzon	Cavite	Silang	38.00	23.61		Silang West	Aguinaldo Highway / Silang–General Trias Road	Diamond interchange
Calabarzon	Cavite	Silang	41.20	25.60		Silang East	N410 (Aguinaldo Highway)	Trumpet interchange
Calabarzon	Cavite	Silang	43.00	26.72	Silang Toll Plaza			
Calabarzon	Cavite	Silang	45.50	28.27		Santa Rosa–Tagaytay	N420 (Santa Rosa–Tagaytay Road)	Diamond interchange serving Tagaytay and Silang
Calabarzon	Cavite	Silang	47.20	29.33	Caltex / Shell Service Areas (CALAX)			
Calabarzon	Cavite	Silang	49.00	30.45		Laguna Boulevard	Laguna Boulevard / Nuvali Boulevard	Diamond interchange serving Don Bosco and Nuvali
Calabarzon	Laguna	Biñan	51.20	31.81		Laguna Technopark	Laguna Technopark Access Road	Diamond interchange
Calabarzon	Laguna	Biñan	53.00	32.93		Mamplasan	LIIP Avenue / Mamplasan Access Road	Diamond interchange
Calabarzon	Laguna	Biñan	54.20	33.68	Mamplasan Toll Plaza			
Calabarzon	Laguna	Biñan	55.00	34.18		SLEX Interchange	E2 (South Luzon Expressway) / AH26 – Manila, Calamba	Eastern terminus of CALAX (E3); trumpet interchange connecting to SLEX (E2)
1.000 mi = 1.609 km; 1.000 km = 0.621 mi: Tolled; Route transition
