= Island Cove (Cavite) =

Island and gambling complex in Cavite, Philippines

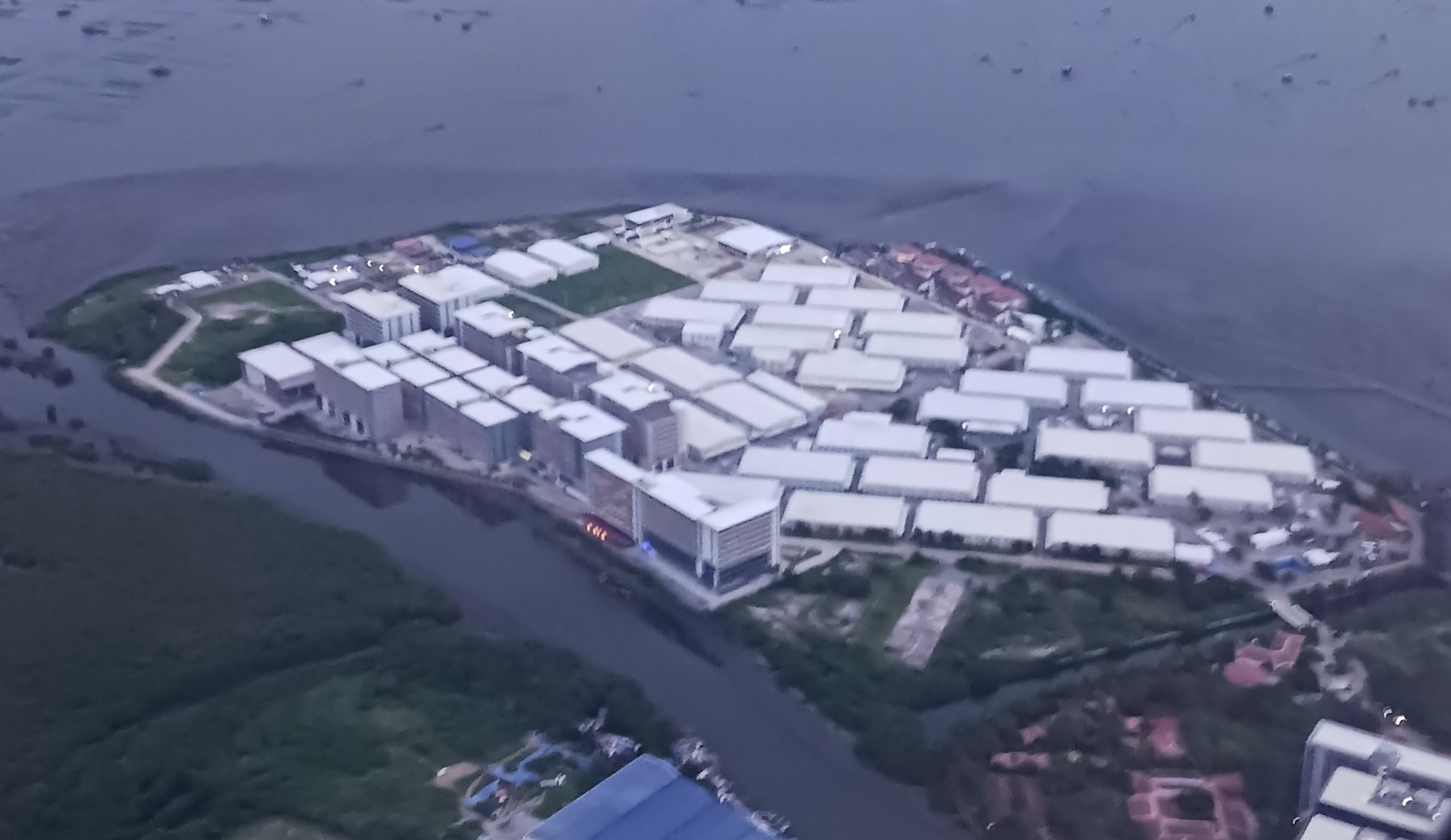
- Island Cove in 2023

Physical features
- Divisions: Island Cove, Animal Island

Location
- Location in the periphery of Metro Manila Location in Luzon Location in the Philippines
- Coordinates: 14°27′40″N 120°55′24″E
- Country: Philippines
- Province: Cavite
- Municipality: Kawit

Island Cove was an online gambling complex primarily owned and controlled by Chinese nationals located on Island Cove and Animal Island in Kawit, Cavite, Philippines.

It was originally a resort and leisure park called Covelandia Island Resort, which closed in 1986 and later reopened under the name Island Cove Resort and Leisure Park, or simply Island Cove, in 1997. Both were owned by the Remulla political family before the property became a hub for Philippine offshore gaming operators (POGOs). The site was operated by the Philippine Amusement and Gaming Corporation (PAGCOR) before being shut down in 2024.

Island Cove was formerly known as Pulo ni Burunggoy (transl. Burunggoy's Island).

== History ==
=== As a resort ===
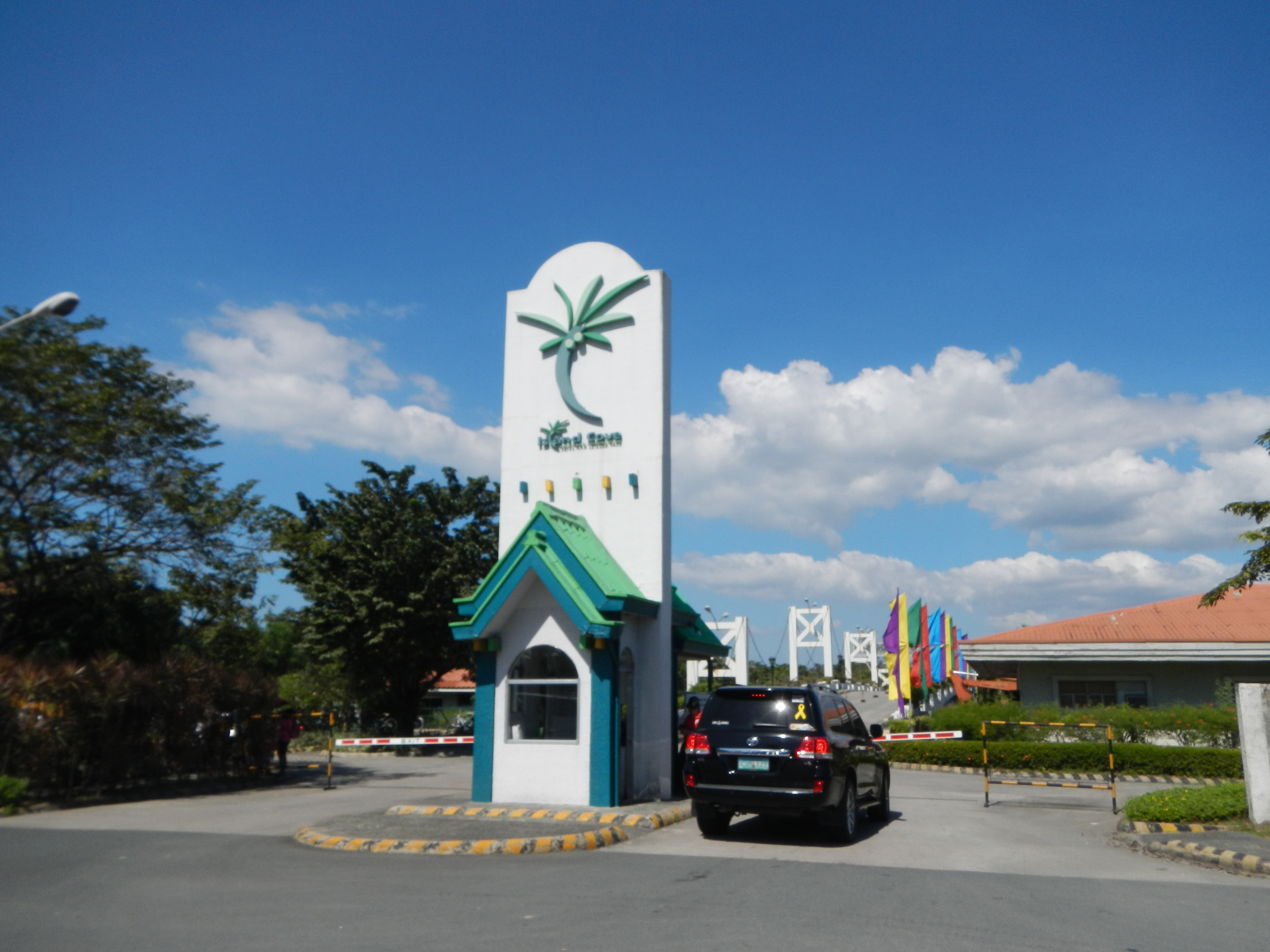
Entrance in 2013

The two islands were originally owned by the Remulla political family. The property hosted a resort and leisure complex twice: first as Covelandia Island Resort, which operated from the 1970s to the 1980s, and later as Island Cove Resort and Leisure Park, which operated from 1997 to 2018. The resort also featured zoos and a crocodile farm.

Starting in 2007, after his term as congressman ended, Gilbert Remulla served as the general manager of the resort. He stated that his father, Johnny Remulla, opened Covelandia in 1976, which closed in 1986. It then reopened as Island Cove Hotel and Leisure Park in 1997.

In 2018, the property was acquired from the Remullas by a group of Filipino-Chinese businessmen. The resort ceased operations on July 28.

=== As a gambling hub ===
The islands were later developed into an online gambling hub under Oriental Game Ltd. Construction lasted from 2018 to 2021 before the POGO hub became operational.

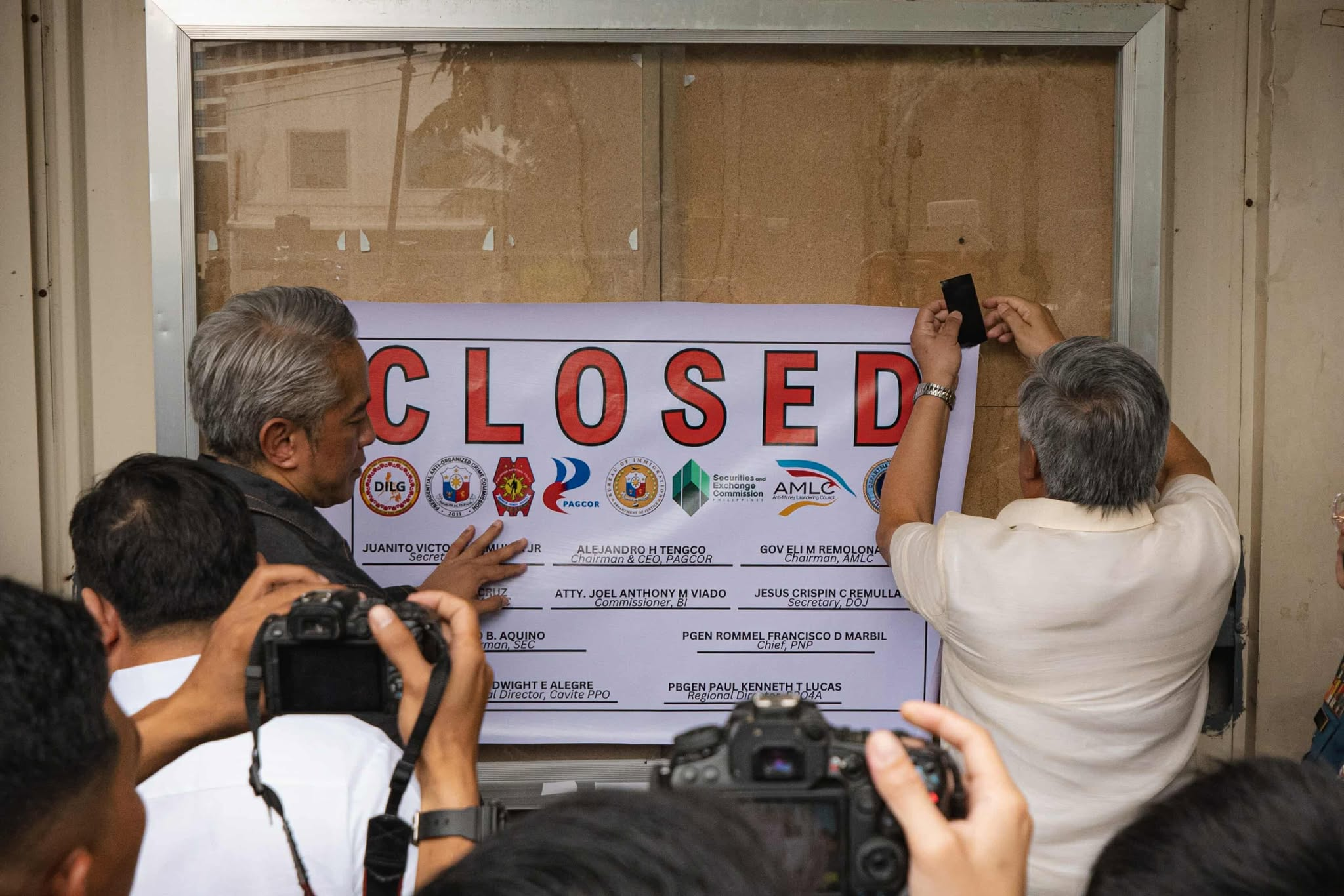
Formal closure of the Philippine Offshore Gaming Operator (POGO) at the former Island Cove in Kawit, Cavite.

The hub employed many Chinese migrant workers, raising security concerns due to its proximity to the Danilo Atienza Air Base amid the territorial disputes in the South China Sea. The Chinese government stated that gambling is illegal in China, including services provided from outside the country by POGOs.

In 2023, the POGO industry – and by extension, the hub – was the subject of a Senate inquiry. PAGCOR stated that it had found no illegal activities occurring within the hub's premises.

The casino hub ceased operations on November 30, 2024, following a directive by President Bongbong Marcos to ban POGOs in the country. It was certified closed by the Department of the Interior and Local Government on December 17, 2024.

== Facilities ==
=== Resort ===
By 2014, the resort had the following facilities:

- Oceania Swim and Splash Park
- Animal Island (a wildlife sanctuary)
- Adventure Zone (paintball arena and airsoft site)
- Island Cove Maze Challenge

The resort's proximity to Metro Manila was one of its main selling points.

By 2015, other amenities included a spa, KTV, four restaurants, and a hotel.

=== Gambling hub ===
The Island Cove POGO hub was built by Monolith, with Jose Siao Ling & Associates as the architect. It had a conditioned floor area of 276,782.09 m^{2} (2,979,257.6 sq ft). It covered an area of 30 hectares (74 acres) and consisted of 57 buildings. The hub included entertainment outlets, a clinic, restaurants, a hotel, and dormitories.

== Operations ==
=== Gambling hub ===
First Orient owned the Island Cove POGO hub but leased the property to four licensees: Glarion Technologies, Merit Legend Solutions, Squared Route Technologies, and Digital Jenius. At its peak, the hub employed around 30,000 people but had only 4,000 remaining at the time of its closure.
