= Alabang–Zapote Flyover =

Flyover in Bacoor and Las Piñas, Philippines

Alabang–Zapote Flyover
- Zapote Flyover (Note: In official Department of Public Works and Highways (DPWH) project documents and bridge inventories, the physical elevated bridge structure (Bridge ID: B01764LZ) is formally designated as "Zapote Fly-over", while the entire road segment including its eastern and western approach ramps is classified under the road name "Zapote-Alabang Flyover".); Zapote–Alabang Flyover; Zapote Overpass
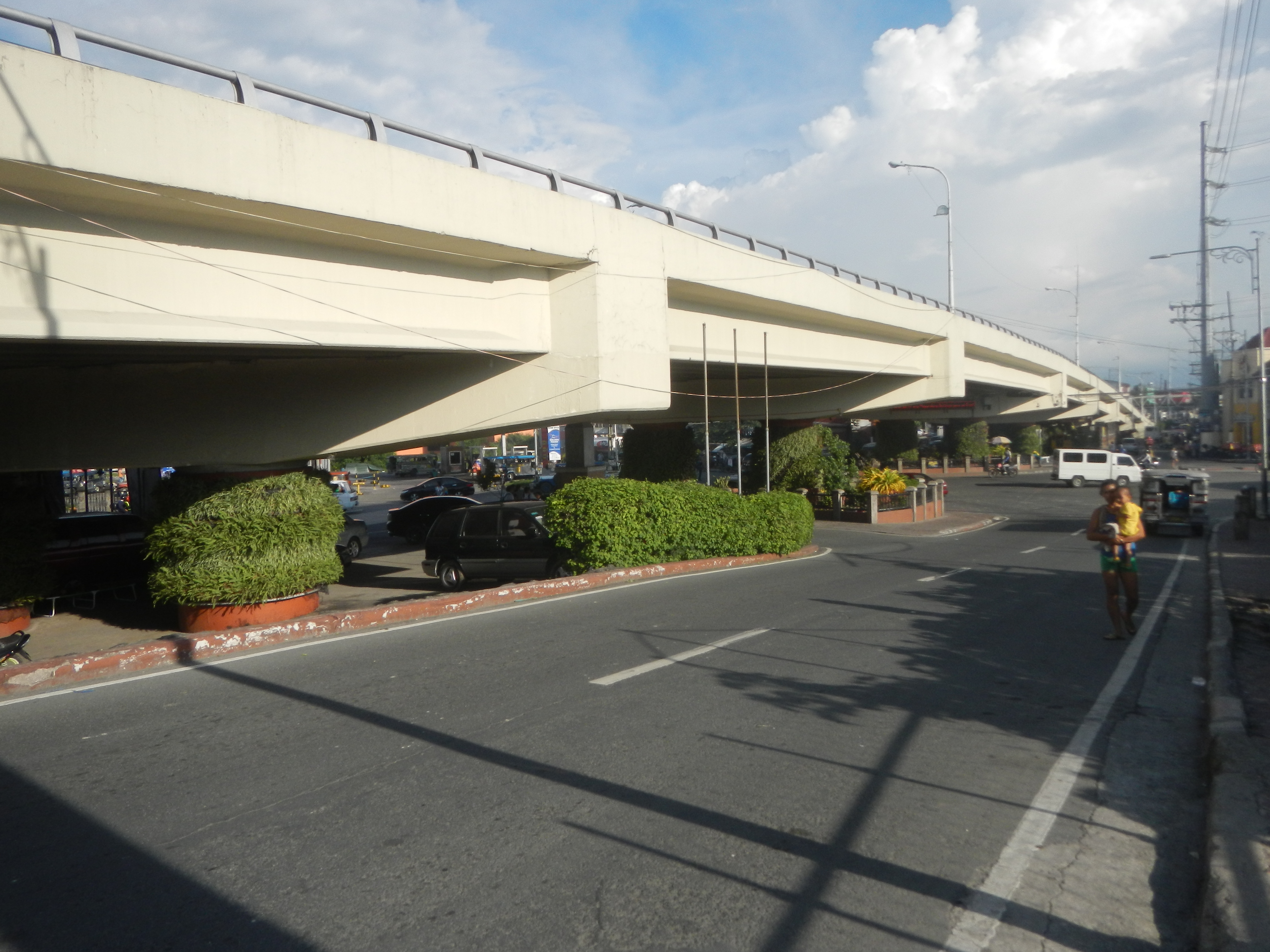
- Underside view of Alabang–Zapote Flyover from Zapote Bridge 2, Las Piñas City

- Interactive map of Alabang–Zapote Flyover

Location
- Las Piñas City, Metro Manila, Philippines
- Coordinates: 14°27′57.1″N 120°58′05.1″E
- Roads at junction: N62 (Emilio Aguinaldo Highway); N62 (Quirino Avenue); N411 (Alabang–Zapote Road); Las Piñas–Talaba Diversion Road

Construction
- Type: Two-level flyover
- Constructed: 1996–1998 by R. Eusebio Development Corp. and Concrete Aggregates Corp.
- Opened: May 1998
- Maintained by: Department of Public Works and Highways

The Alabang–Zapote Flyover, also known as Zapote Flyover (and formerly known as Alabang–Zapote Centennial Flyover) is a four-lane highway flyover located along the Alabang–Zapote Road between the cities of Bacoor and Las Piñas, Philippines.

== History ==
=== Planning and construction (1996–1998) ===
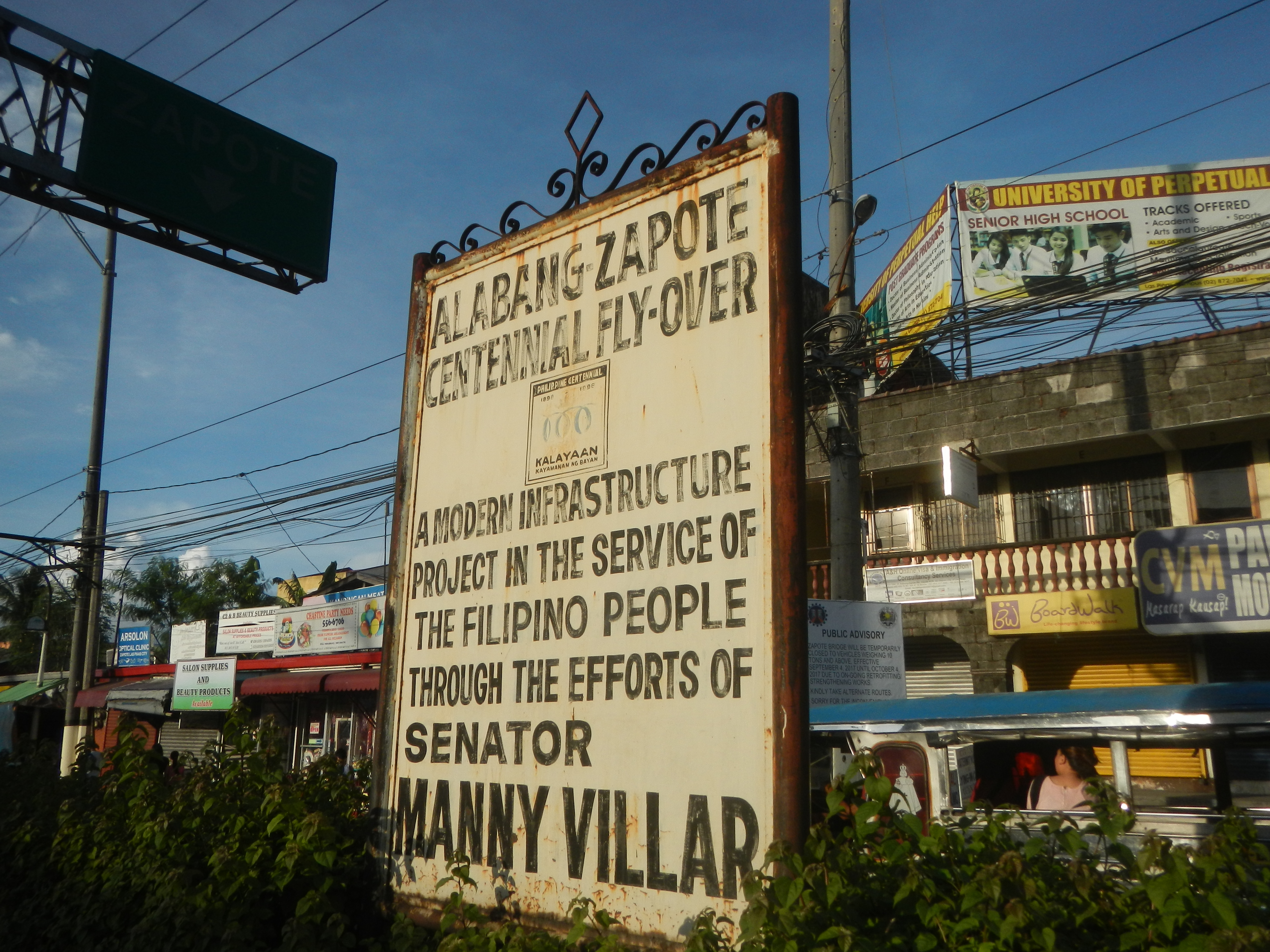
Project marker of
the flyover

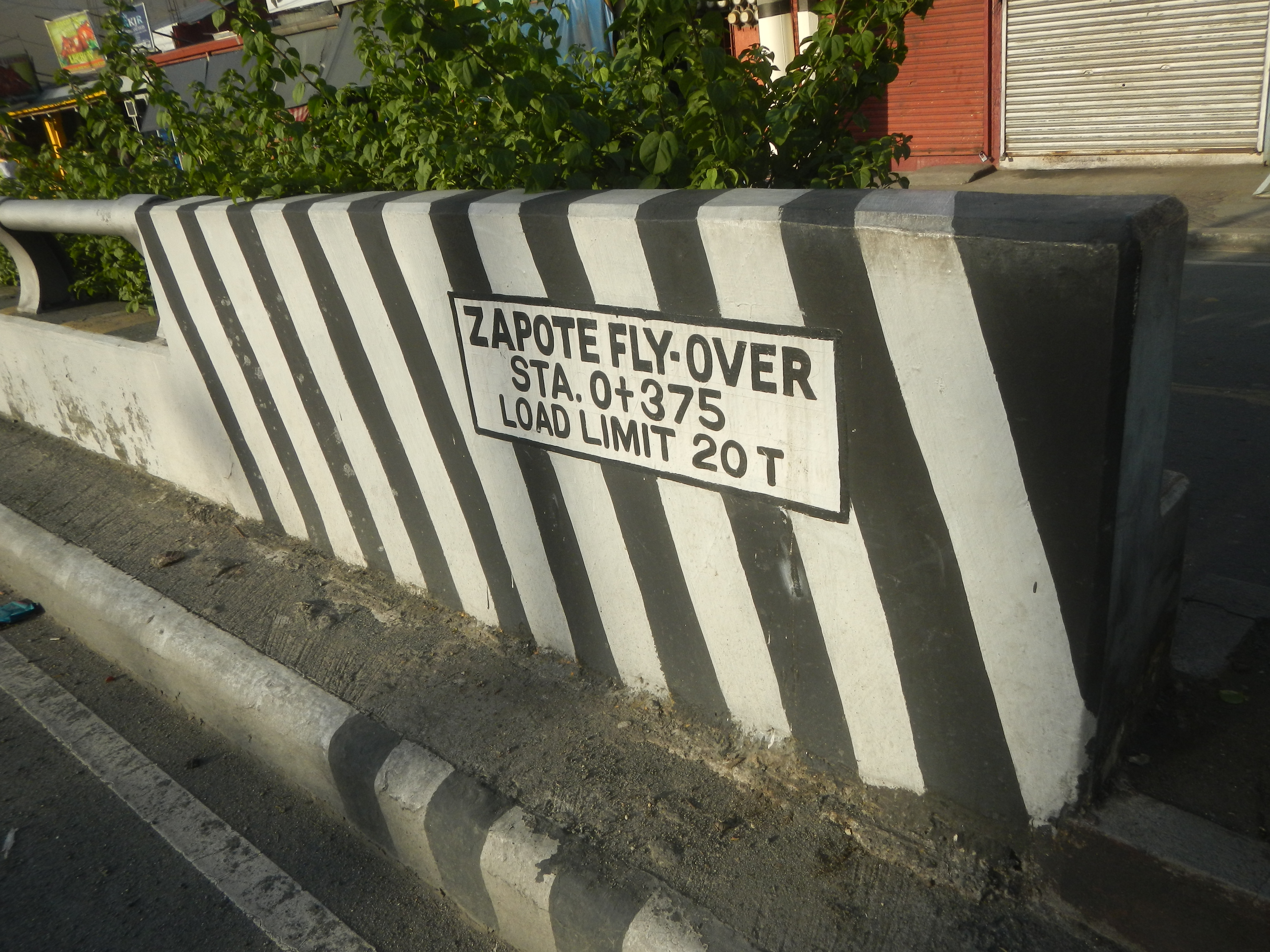
Flyover's identification
marker

The Alabang–Zapote Flyover was conceived as a remedial measure to ease perennial traffic congestion in the southern gateway of Metro Manila, which experienced severe bottlenecks during peak holiday seasons. The intersection connecting the Talaba Diversion Road (now Las Piñas–Talaba Diversion Road), Quirino Avenue, the Manila–Cavite Coastal Road (MCCR), and Alabang–Zapote Road was heavily congested, prompting the national government to expedite the project.

Construction of the flyover took place between 1996 and 1998. The construction of the 216.92-meter (711.7 ft) four-lane flyover was executed under a ₱16 million contract by a joint venture consisting of R. Eusebio Development Corp. and Concrete Aggregates Corp. To facilitate the project, then-representative of the Las Piñas–Muntinlupa lone district, Manny Villar Jr., resolved critical right-of-way issues that allowed full-scale construction to proceed. The project was integrated into Villar's broader ₱1-billion infrastructure development program for Las Piñas.

The construction of the flyover was rushed to be completed by Christmas in 1997. It was completed and opened in May 1998.

== Projections and design ==
At the time of its design, traffic volume along the Alabang–Zapote Road was growing at an estimated rate of 8.94% annually. Civil engineers designed the flyover to handle projected traffic volumes of up to 45,616 vehicles daily on Alabang–Zapote Road and an additional 80,700 daily vehicles on the MCCR by the year 2000. To ensure long-term structural integrity and public safety since the region is seismically active, developers integrated specialized earthquake-resistant design concepts into the flyover's foundational and structural plans.

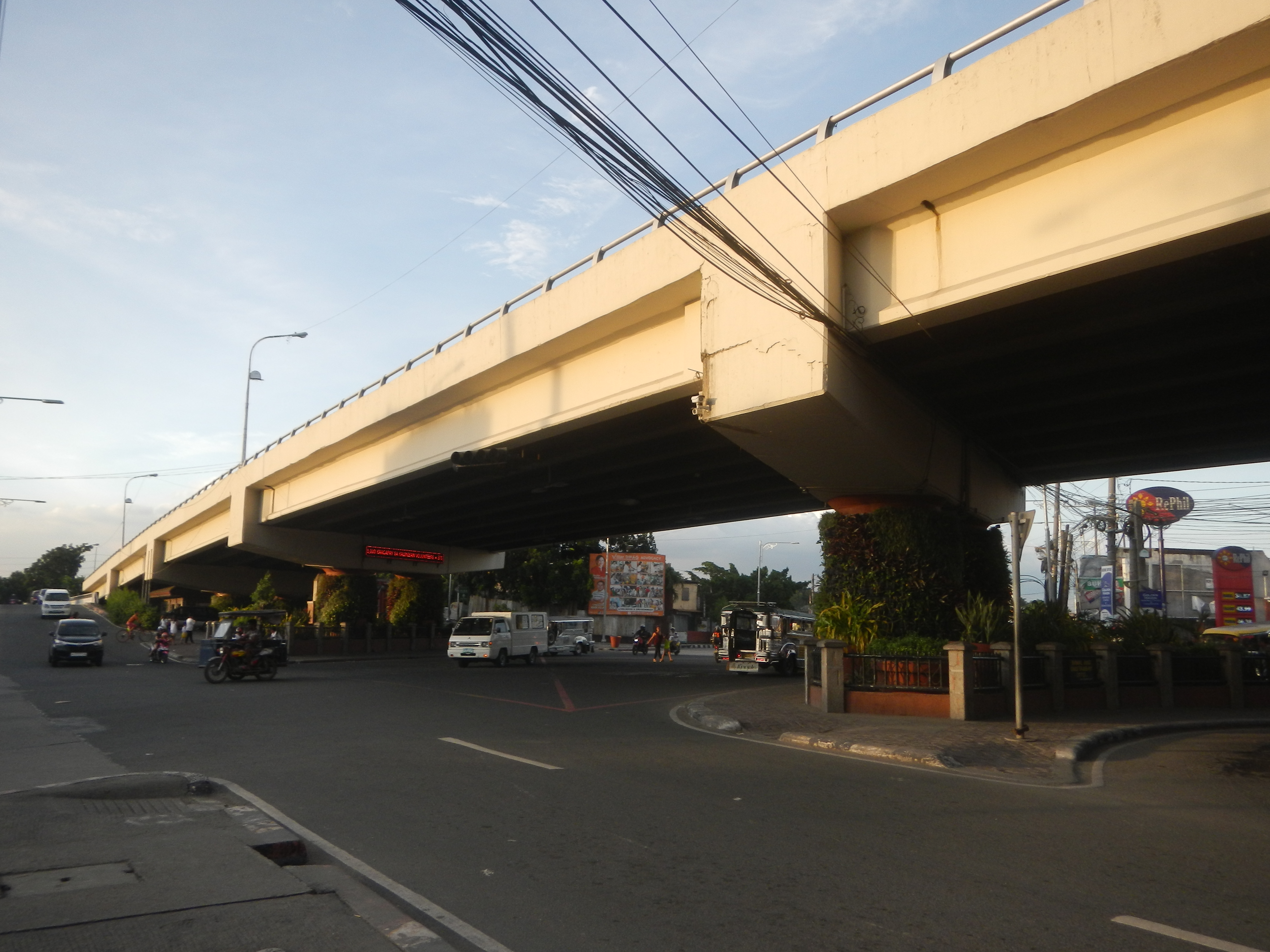
Underside view of the flyover from Alabang–Zapote Road

In mid-2026, the DPWH initiated a major structural retrofitting and rehabilitation project for the flyover to extend its total service life and enhance structural load capacity. It is primarily focused on seismic strengthening, concrete preservation, and modernized traffic safety updates.

== Route description ==
The Alabang–Zapote Flyover is located along the Alabang–Zapote Road (National Route 411 or N411). The flyover carries traffic over P. Diego Cera Avenue of Quirino Avenue. Its approach towards Longos/Cavitex forms part of the route designated as the "Zapote–Alabang Flyover to Cavitex," extending toward Longos Junction and connecting with National Route 62, also known as Aguinaldo Boulevard, and routes leading to the Manila–Cavite Expressway (Cavitex).

== See also ==
- Alabang–Zapote Road
- Emilio Aguinaldo Highway
- Longos Flyover
- Manila–Cavite Expressway
- Quirino Avenue
- Zapote Interchange
