= Lara House (Las Piñas) =

Historic house in Las Piñas, Philippines

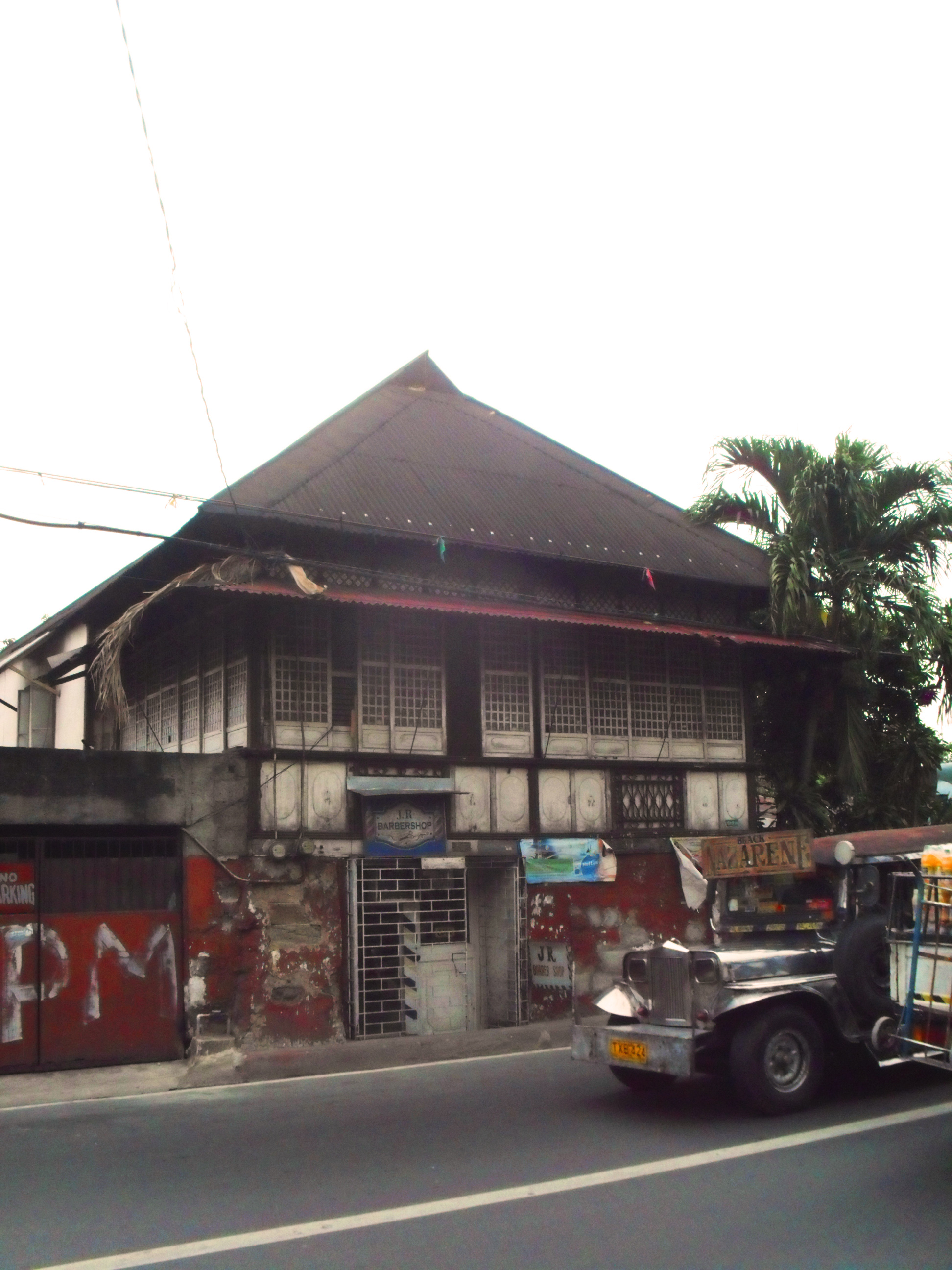
- Front façade of Lara House along Quirino Avenue

General information
- Type: Single Detached (detachment); Townhouse (function)
- Architectural style: Second Transition Post 1860s Bahay na Bato; Quadrant Style
- Location: 160 Diego Cera Avenue, Barangay Ilaya, Las Piñas

Technical details
- Material: Adobe and wood

The Lara House is a historic house located in Las Piñas, Metro Manila, Philippines. Built in the 1880s, the house was the first municipal hall of Las Piñas where its first mayor, Juan Tiongkiao, held office from 1905 to 1913.

Along with its growth, the seat of power of Las Piñas continued to adapt with several changes as well.

== History ==
Don Calixto Lara, who used to own salt beds and lands, and his wife Andeng Velasquez were the original owners of the house. Don Calixto Lara was one of the 95 men that gathered and assembled for the Act of Philippine Declaration of Independence, signed by the War Counsellor and Special Delegate-Designate, Ambrosio Rianzares Bautista. Don Calixto together with his brothers Pedro and Bernardo Lara have worked on the famous Las Piñas Bamboo Organ for repairs

Francesca Lara, daughter of Calixto Lara, was only 16 years old when the house was built. Her brothers, Cirpriano Lara, has lineage to Charlene Gonzales (Bb. Pilipinas-Universe 1994 and a finalist in the 1994 Miss Universe Pageant held in Manila) while Elioterio Lara worked as clerk in Cuartel Master located in Intramuros, Manila. Her husband was Graciano Santos. They were the grandparents of the current owner.

Trinidad Santos, daughter of Graciano Santos, was born on June 1, 1903. Her husband was Agrifino Trajano from Pasay (formerly Pineda). They were the parents of the current owner. Laura Trajano, born on June 30, 1931, was the current co-owner and occupant of the ancestral house.

== Transition of the functions of the Municipal Hall ==
=== From Old Municipal Hall to Las Piñas District Hospital ===
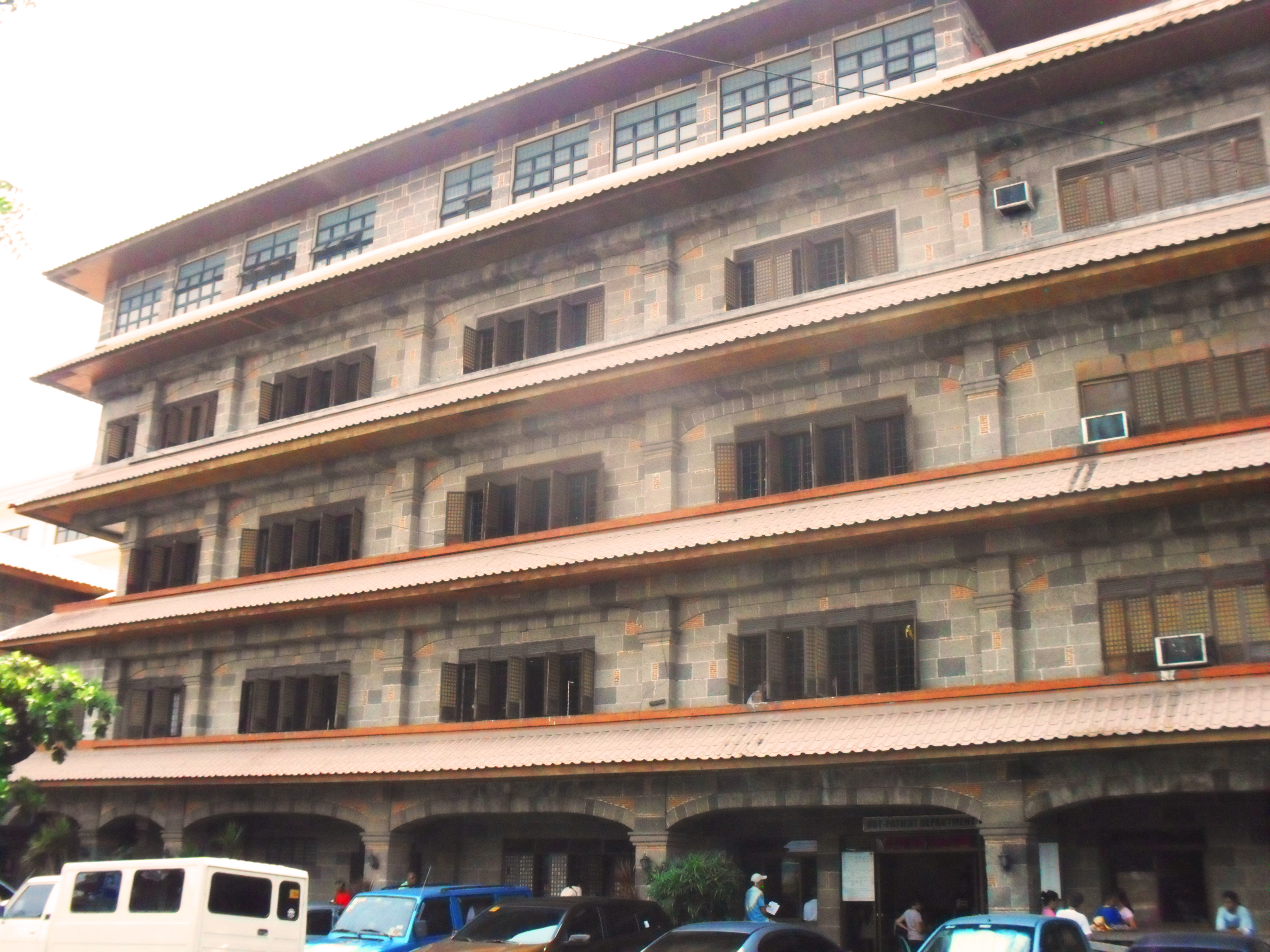
Another view of Las Piñas General Hospital and Satellite Trauma Center

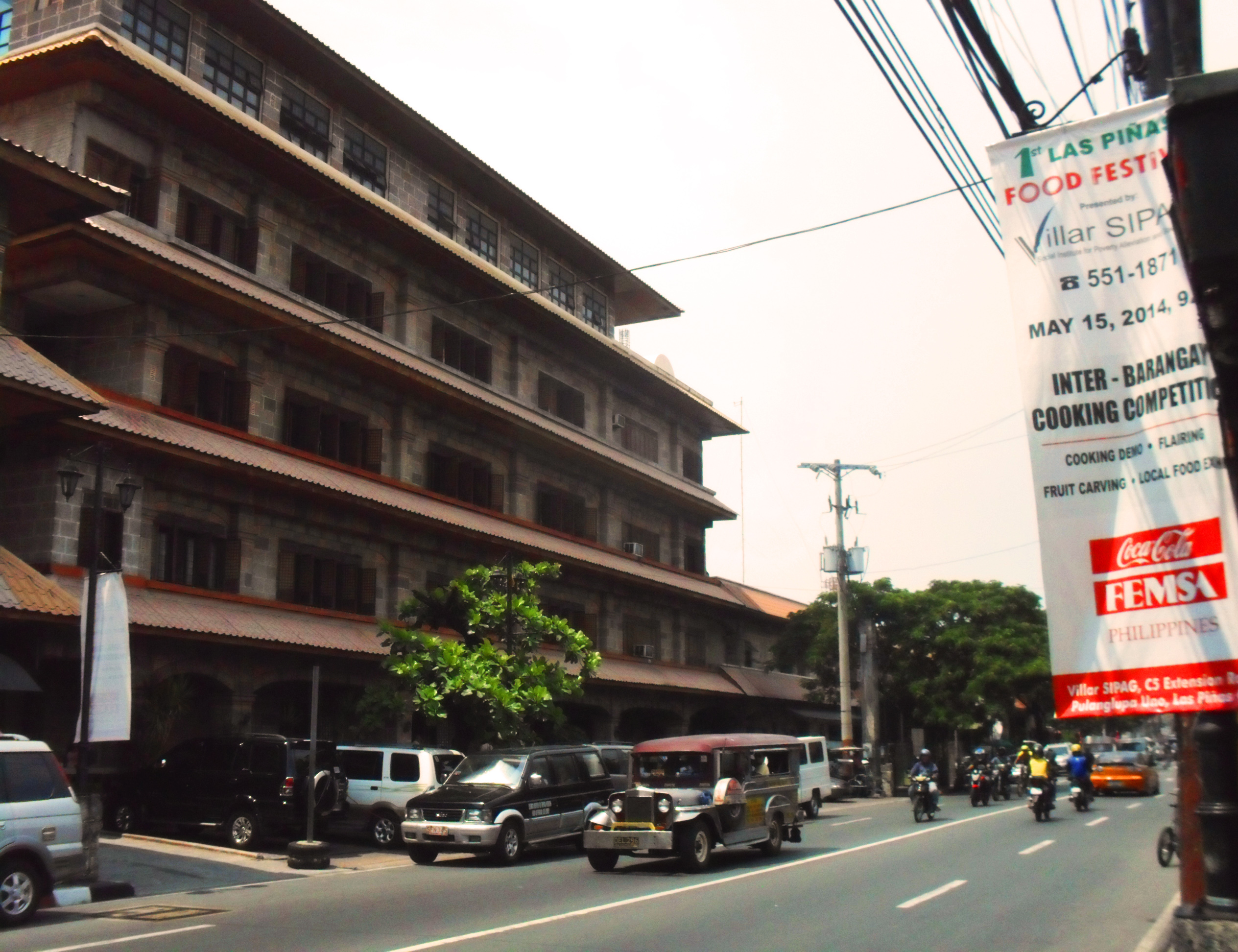
Another view of Las Piñas General Hospital and Satellite Trauma Center

After serving its function at the Lara House, the administration was transferred into the former municipal library of the poblacion located at Daniel Fajardo. It was later converted into Las Piñas Emergency Hospital. The Las Piñas Emergency Hospital was established in 1977. It formally began as an Out-Patient Clinic. In 1984, former Mayor Filemon Aguilar upgraded the facility into the Las Piñas District Hospital by moving at another site, presently located in Bernabe Compound, Pulanglupa in 1988. From 25-bed capacity, the Las Piñas District Hospital could then accommodate 50-bed capacity.

Front facade of the New Las Piñas City Hall

=== From Las Piñas District Hospital to Las Piñas General Hospital and Satellite Trauma Center ===
In response to the needs of the rising population growth rate, Republic Act No. 9240, whose principal sponsor was Representative Cynthia Villar was approved on February 10, 2004. The Act provided for the increase in bed capacity of the Las Piñas District Hospital from fifty (50) to two hundred (200) beds. The 400% increase in bed capacity would be implemented gradually over a three (3) year period.

=== Las Piñas City Hall ===
At present, the seat of administration of Las Piñas is located at the Las Piñas City Hall (Pamahalaang Lungsod ng Las Piñas) located along Alabang–Zapote Road. It was constructed during the second term of Mayor Nene Aguilar.

== Description ==
=== Architectural characteristics ===
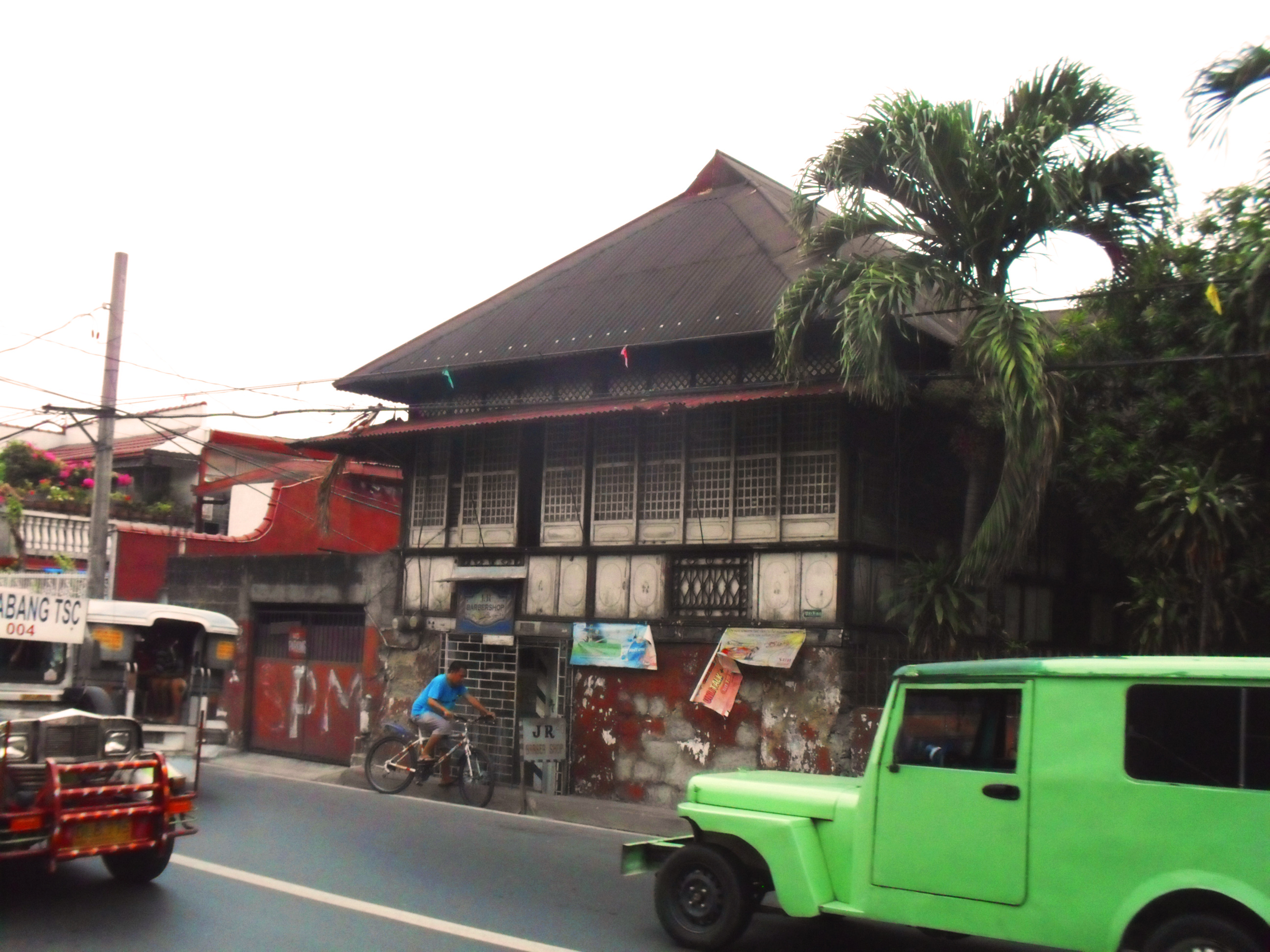
Front of Lara House

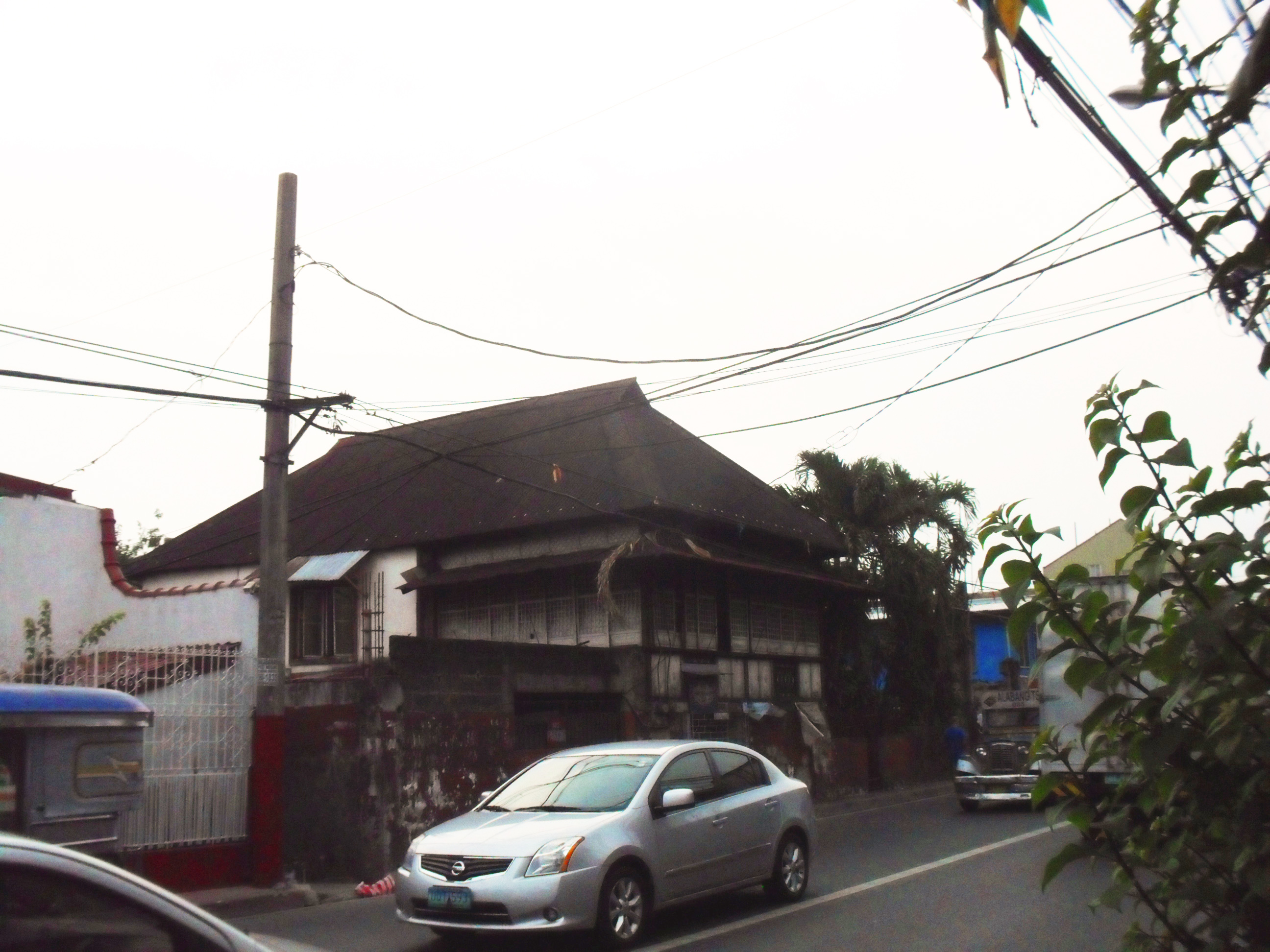
Left-Side of Lara House

The Lara House is a Post and Lintel Type of construction. Wood posts were located at the ground floor - reaching up to the second floor. It reflects Second Transition Post-1860s Bahay na Bato Quadrant Style. With its predecessor, the First Transition Pre-1860s (which uses clay roofing tiles), the said style integrated galvanized (G.I.) roofing with thick gauge, second floor made of wood, and ground floor made of adobe stone. It is a single detached structure with an L-configuration plan. One of its unique architectural features was its three-paneled wooden door located at the second floor.

The ground floor served as silong – laid with concrete flooring. Glass jalousies, steel bars, and grill doors were also located. The termination of full-height adobe walls was adorned with round-edge cornice. The second floor, which catered residential uses before, was laid with wide wood planks. Wooden door panels, and sliding capiz-shell windows and persianas (wooden louvers) were also located. Some decorative elements on the second floor includes wood beveling, ventanillas, capsule-shaped design in the center panels, diagonal lattice espejo (clerestory), and pilasters with moldings.

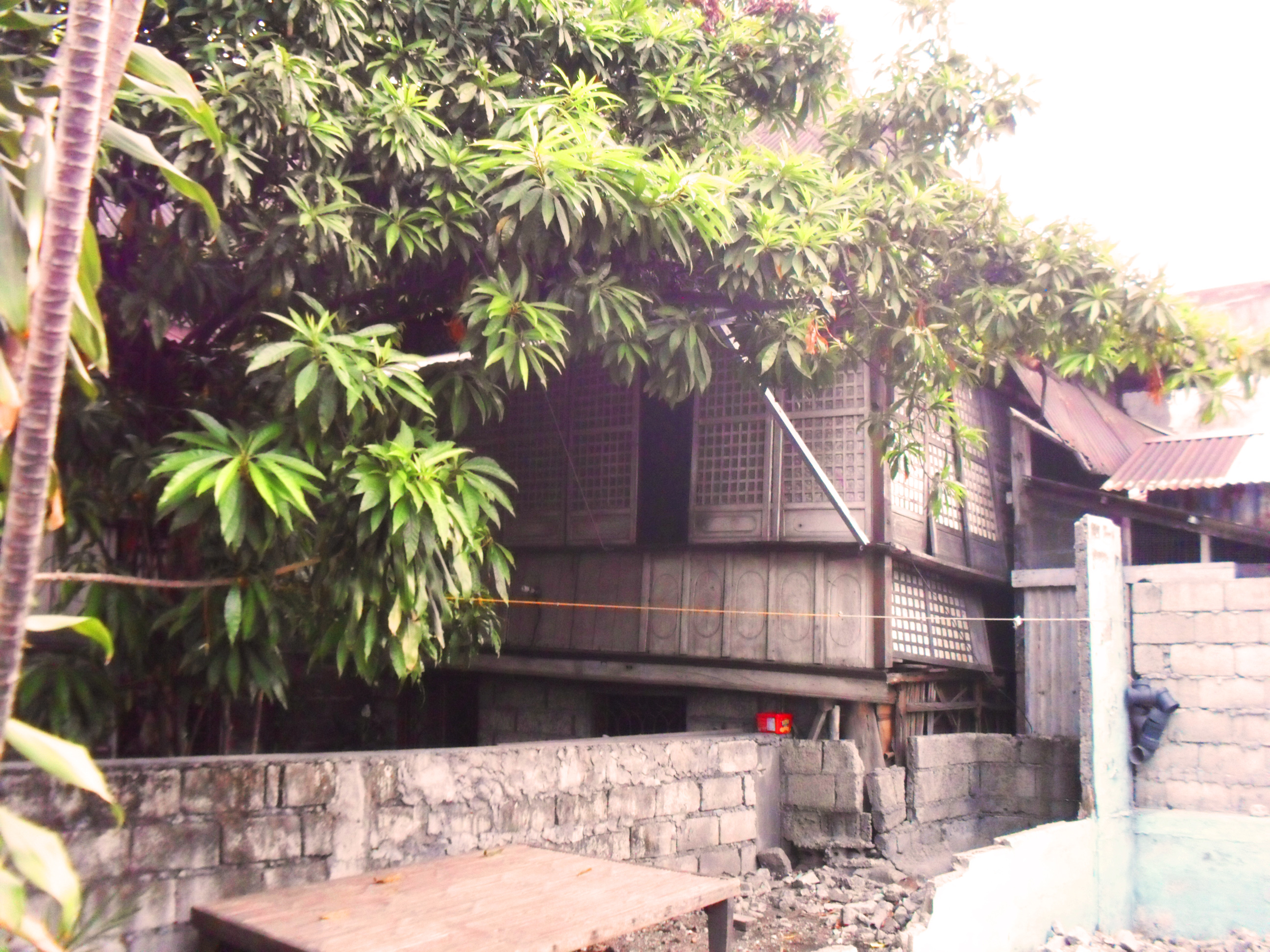
Right-Side of Lara House

== Present situation ==
At present, the ground floor of the Lara House was utilized into a mixed use - residential occupancy and a barber shop. A grilled gate replaced the front door. The other parts of the house were disintegrated. Additional works were also conducted such as overlaying of concrete hollow blocks and cement finishes. Several tarpaulins were also posted within the front facade of the house. Electrical wiring, accumulation of black deposits, and nearby vegetation present problems as well.
