= Zapote Interchange =

Trumpet interchange in Bacoor, Cavite

- Longos Interchange; Zapote Bridge; Zapote Bridge 1 Zapote Coastal Bridge
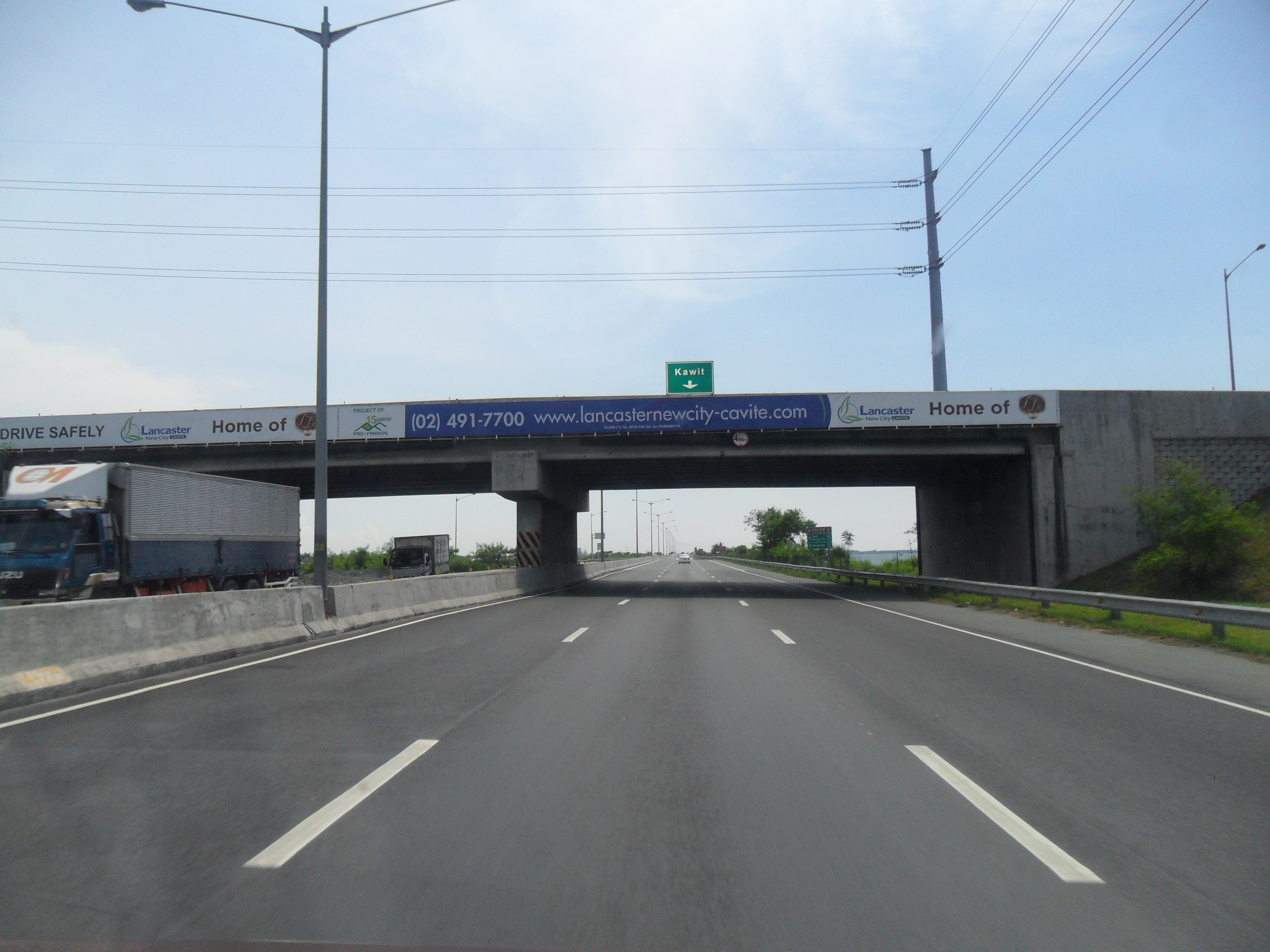
- View of the Zapote Interchange from the Manila–Cavite Expressway
- Interactive map of Zapote Interchange

Location
- Bacoor, Cavite Philippines
- Coordinates: 14°28′15.7″N 120°57′42.7″E
- Roads at junction: E3 (Manila–Cavite Expressway); N62 (Aguinaldo Highway); N411 (Alabang–Zapote Road)

Construction
- Type: Two-level trumpet interchange
- Constructed: by Katahira & Engineers Asia, Inc. and Ron Daniels Construction
- Opened: 2014
- Maintained by: Department of Public Works and Highways; Cavite Infrastructure Corporation

The Zapote Interchange, also known as the Longos Interchange, Zapote Bridge and Zapote Coastal Bridge, is a two-level trumpet interchange in Bacoor, Cavite, Philippines, close to the border with Las Piñas in Metro Manila. Opened in its current form in 2014, it serves as the junction between the Manila–Cavite Expressway (CAVITEX), the Aguinaldo Highway and the Alabang–Zapote Road. Along with the Longos Flyover, the interchange facilitates traffic for northbound traffic towards Manila from Bacoor and Las Piñas, as well as southbound traffic from Manila towards both cities as well as Kawit and other towns in Cavite.

== History ==
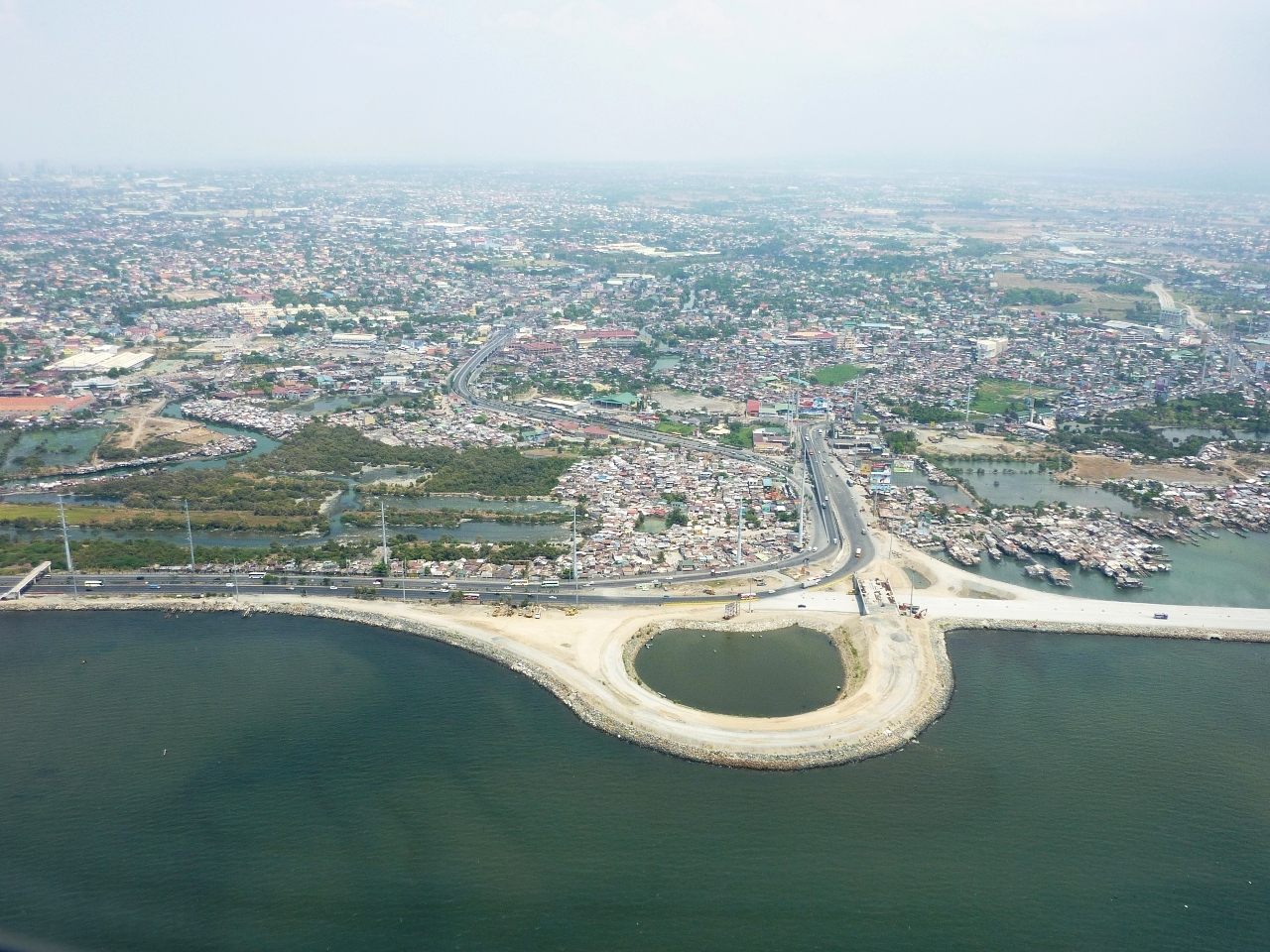
Bacoor (Longos) Exit under construction in 2010 as part of the R1 Expressway Extension project

The Zapote Interchange was constructed in 2008 alongside the Kawit extension of the Manila–Cavite Expressway (CAVITEX) as part of the R1 Expressway Extension project. It serves as an exit from CAVITEX toward Bacoor and Las Piñas.

Before the construction of the Zapote Interchange and the Kawit extension, vehicles exiting the expressway would make a direct left turn to leave the roadway. After the extension was completed, a dedicated loop exit was created, known as the Bacoor–Las Piñas Exit, the Bacoor–Las Piñas Exit Loop, or the Bacoor (Longos) Exit.

The Bacoor–Las Piñas Exit begins at CAVITEX, where vehicles turn right to enter the loop; the ramp then ascends and turns left onto the Zapote Interchange, which passes over CAVITEX toward Kawit.

In November 2025, a portion of Bacoor–Las Piñas Exit including the Zapote Interchange, was affected by scheduled power interruptions due to maintenance activities conducted by the Manila Electric Company (Meralco).
