= N401 highway =

Road in the Philippines

Route 401
- Noveleta–Naic–Tagaytay Road

Route information
- Maintained by Department of Public Works and Highways (DPWH) - Cavite 1st District Engineering Office
- Length: 5.601 km (3.480 mi)

Major junctions
- Northeast end: N62 (M. Salud Road) / Magdiwang Highway in Noveleta
- N62 (Magdiwang Highway / Manila–Cavite Road) / General Antonio Street in Noveleta
- Southwest end: N64 (Antero Soriano Highway) / Governor Ferrer Drive in General Trias

Location
- Country: Philippines
- Provinces: Cavite
- Major cities: General Trias
- Towns: Noveleta, Rosario

Highway system
- Roads in the Philippines; Highways; Expressways; List
| ← N307 | → N402 |

National Route 401 (N401) forms part of the Philippine highway network. It connects the municipalities of Noveleta to the city of General Trias through the municipality of Rosario.

== Route description ==
N401 covers the Noveleta to General Trias segment of what is called by DPWH as the Noveleta–Naic–Tagaytay Road.

=== Noveleta to Rosario ===
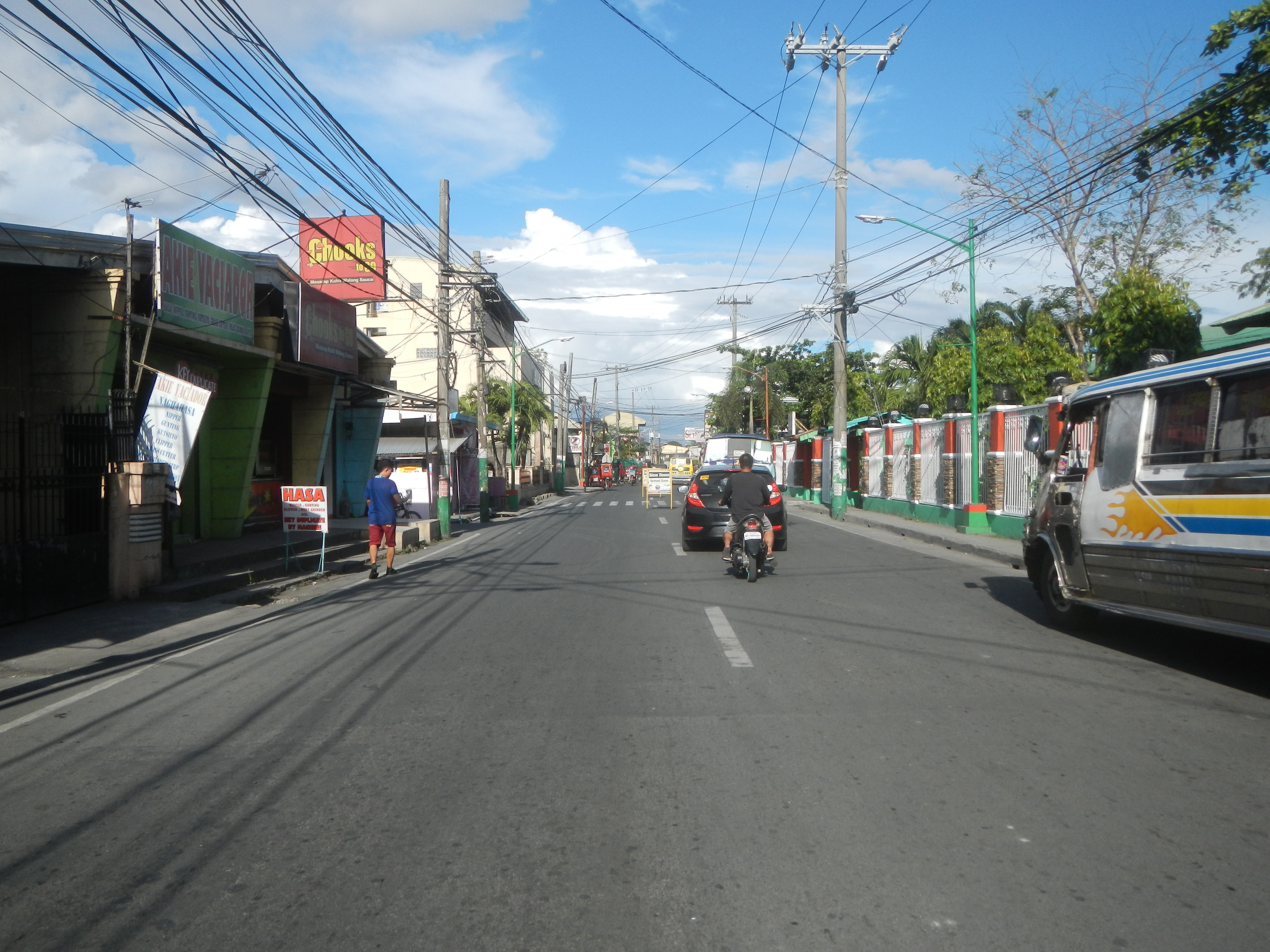
Marseilla Street

N401 commences at the junction with N62 (M. Salud Road) in Noveleta as Magdiwang Highway, continuing the highway's tertiary road segment also known as Noveleta Diversion Road. Shortly, it meets its junction with N62 (Manila–Cavite Road) ang General Antonio Street and becomes Marseilla Street. It runs southwest up to Catalino Abueg Street, where it forms a corner of the Rosario Town Plaza, in the Rosario town proper.

=== Rosario to General Trias ===
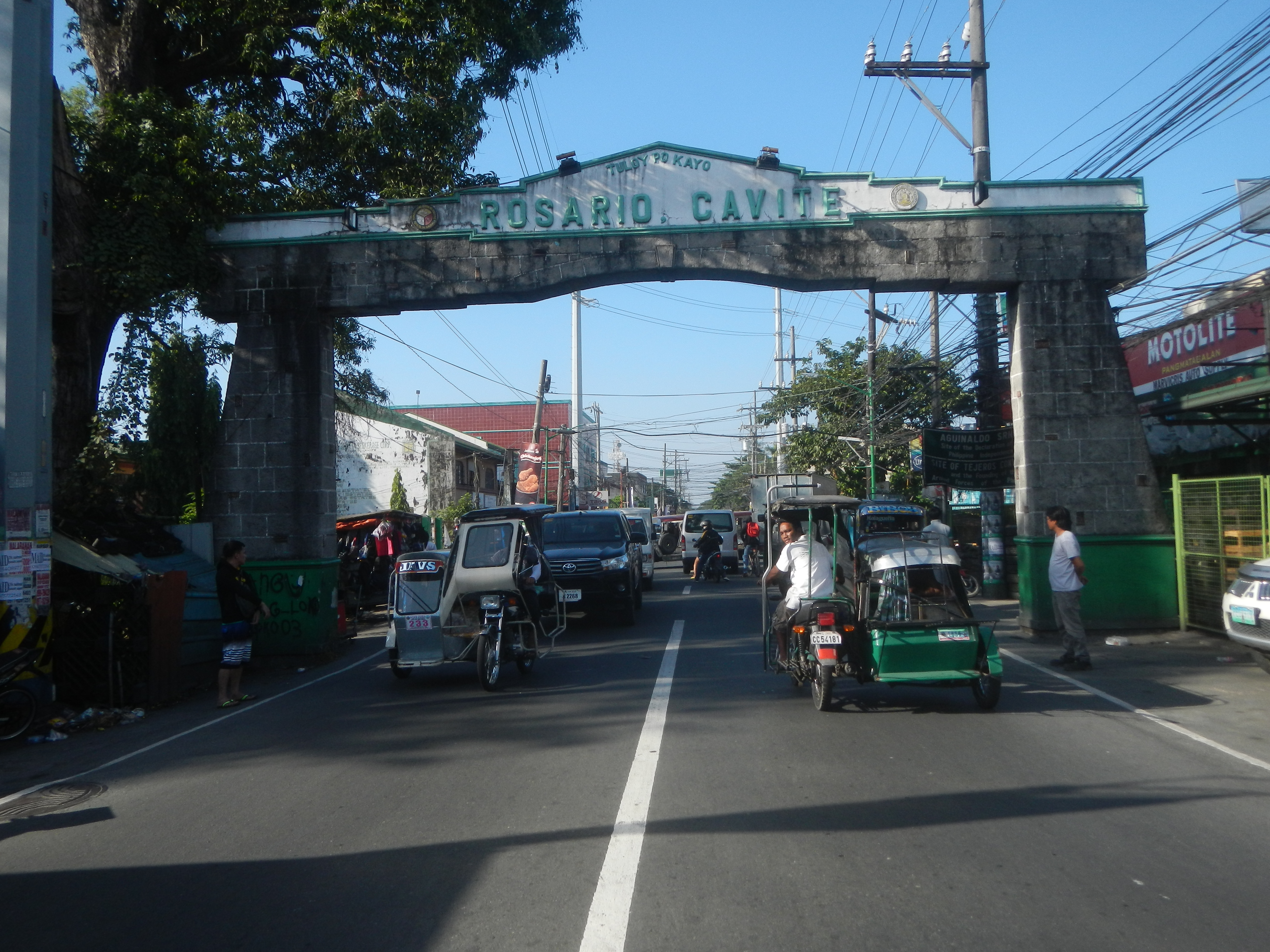
Welcome Arch of Rosario and General Trias at General Trias Drive

Upon meeting Catalino Abueg Street in Rosario, N401 veers southeast and becomes General Trias Drive. Notable landmarks along this route include the Petron Rosario Depot, SM City Rosario, Gate 1 of the Cavite Export Processing Zone, and the Tejeros Convention Site. N401 then enters the city of General Trias, where it ends at the junction with Antero Soriano Highway and Governor Ferrer Drive in barangay Tejero.

== Intersections ==
The entire route is located in Cavite. Intersections are numbered by kilometer posts, with Rizal Park in Manila designated as kilometer zero.

| City/Municipality | km | mi | Destinations | Notes |
|---|---|---|---|---|
| Noveleta | 26.26 | 16.32 | N62 (M. Salud Road) / Magdiwang Highway | Northeastern terminus. |
| Noveleta | 26.35 | 16.37 | N62 (Magdiwang Highway / Manila–Cavite Road) / General Antonio Street | Traffic light intersection. |
| Rosario | 29.7 | 18.5 | Catalino Abueg Street | N401 changes from Marseilla Street to General Trias Drive |
| Rosario | 30.1 | 18.7 | Nawasa Road | |
| Rosario | 30.92 | 19.21 | Cavite Economic Zone Drive | Access to the Cavite Export Processing Zone via Gate 1 |
| General Trias | 31.8 | 19.8 | Tejeros Bypass Road | |
| General Trias | 32.2 | 20.0 | N64 (Antero Soriano Highway) / Governor Ferrer Drive | Southwestern terminus. Traffic light intersection. |
1.000 mi = 1.609 km; 1.000 km = 0.621 mi
