= Diego Cera Avenue =

Major north-south collector road in Las Piñas, Metro Manila, Philippines

Coordinates: 14°28′51″N 120°58′53″E

R-2 Padre Diego Cera Avenue
- Diego Cera Avenue; Quirino Avenue; Calle Real; Manila South Road; Mexico Road
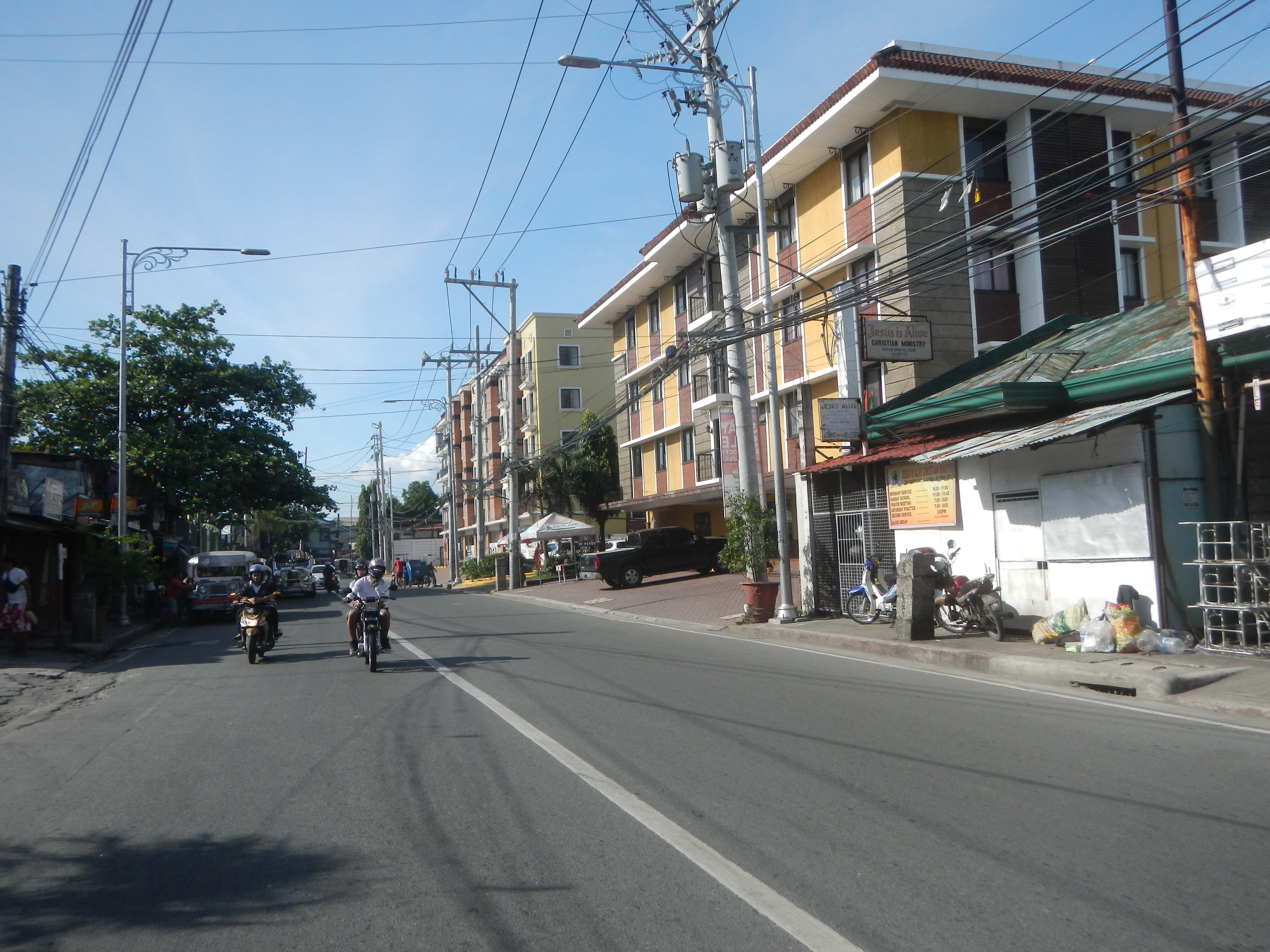
- Diego Cera Avenue northbound in Ilaya

Route information
- Maintained by Department of Public Works and Highways – Las Piñas–Muntinlupa District Engineering Office
- Length: 3 km (1.9 mi)
- Component highways: R-2 R-2; N62

Major junctions
- North end: N62 (Elpidio Quirino Avenue) / Villareal Street at Parañaque–Las Piñas boundary
- N411 (Alabang–Zapote Road)
- South end: Zapote Bridge at Las Piñas–Bacoor boundary

Location
- Country: Philippines
- Major cities: Las Piñas

Highway system
- Roads in the Philippines; Highways; Expressways; List

Padre Diego Cera Avenue, or simply Diego Cera Avenue, is a major north-south collector road in Las Piñas, Metro Manila, Philippines. It is a four-lane undivided arterial running parallel to the Manila–Cavite Expressway to the west from Manuyo Uno at Las Piñas' border with Parañaque in the north to Zapote near the border with Bacoor in the south. It is a continuation of Elpidio Quirino Avenue from Parañaque and was originally a segment of Calle Real in Las Piñas. The road is a component of the National Route 62 (N62) of the Philippine highway network and Radial Road 2 (R-2) of Manila's arterial road network.

The avenue marks the original shoreline of Manila Bay in Las Piñas as it existed during the Spanish colonial period. Before the construction of the Coastal Road in 1985, the road served as the highway linking Manila with Cavite and other southern provinces. The Manila Bay shoreline is currently about 400 to 600 meters (1,300 to 2,000 ft) to the west.

The road is situated in the Las Piñas historical corridor, home to the city's oldest structures, such as the Las Piñas Church, the Las Piñas Gabaldon Hall, and the old Las Piñas District Hospital. It was named after Fray Diego Cera de la Virgen del Carmen (1762–1832), the Spanish missionary from Huesca who designed and built the Bamboo Organ in 1824.

== Route description ==
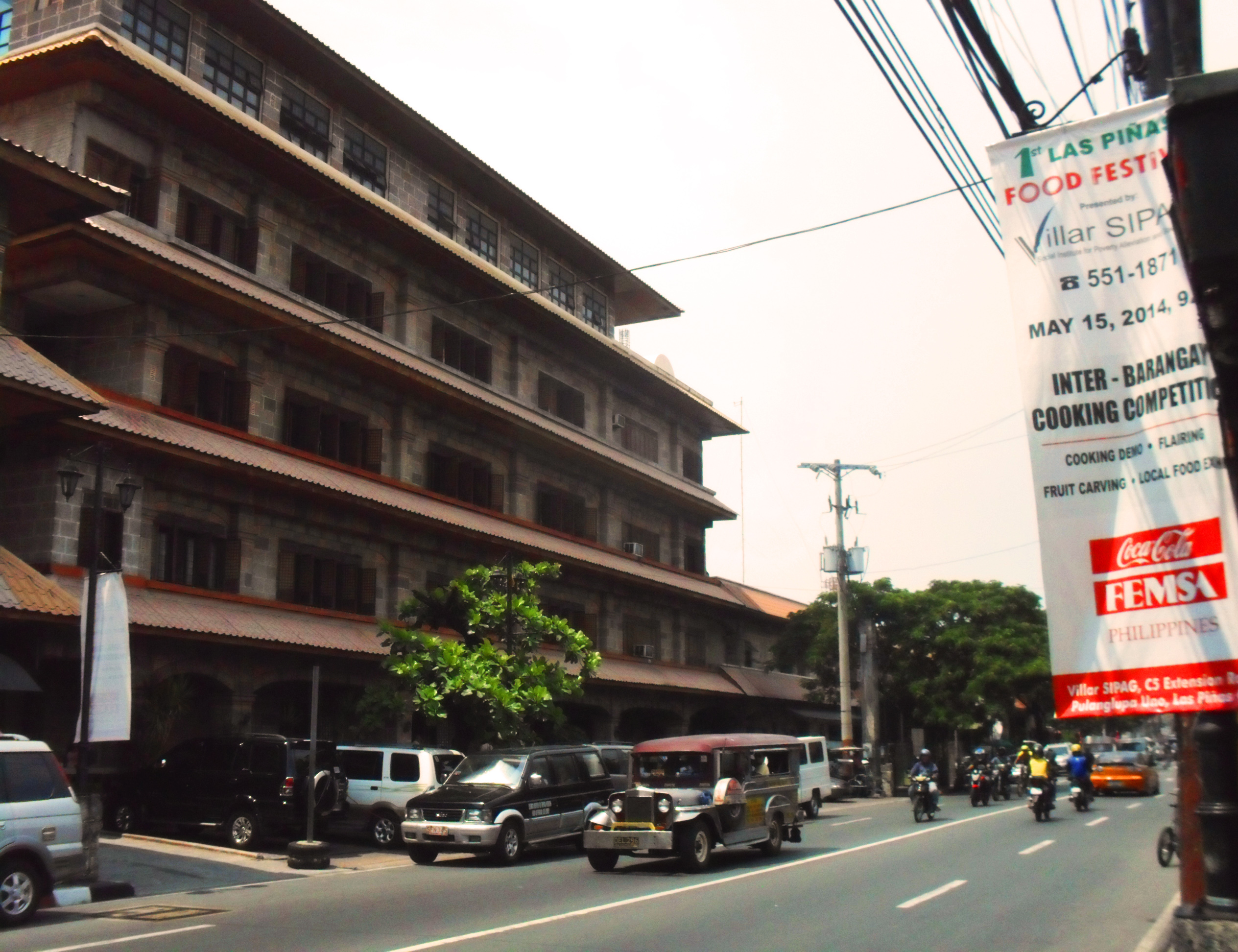
The Las Piñas General Hospital on Diego Cera Avenue

Diego Cera Avenue begins in barangay Manuyo Uno as a continuation of Elpidio Quirino Avenue south of Villareal Street, running parallel to the Manila–Cavite Expressway to the west and Fruto Santos Avenue to the east. It proceeds south, entering the old downtown barangays of Daniel Fajardo, Ilaya, and Elias Aldana, where the old Las Piñas Municipal Hall and Las Piñas Church are located. Upon crossing the Las Piñas River via the Diego Cera Bridge, the avenue enters barangay Pulang Lupa Uno, where the old Sarao Motors factory and the Las Piñas General Hospital are located. It intersects with Carlos Garcia Avenue Extension (C-5) and Naga Road before arriving in barangay Zapote. The avenue terminates at Alabang–Zapote Road near the city's boundary with Cavite, where it continues as Aguinaldo Highway.

Other landmarks along the avenue include Saint Joseph's Academy, Plaza Quezon, Las Piñas Catholic Cemetery, Maricielo Villas, and Zapote Public Market.

== Intersections ==
Intersections are numbered by kilometer posts, with Rizal Park in Manila designated as kilometer zero.

Province	City/Municipality	km	mi	Destinations	Notes
Las Piñas–Parañaque boundary				Villareal Street	Northern terminus. Continues north as N62 (Elpidio Quirino Avenue).
Las Piñas				C-5 Road Extension; C-5	Traffic light intersection. No left turn from northbound.
Las Piñas				Naga Road	
Las Piñas				Las Piñas–Talaba Diversion Road	
Las Piñas				Casimiro Avenue	
Las Piñas		14.793	9.192	N411 (Alabang–Zapote Road) – Las Piñas	Traffic light intersection.
Zapote River		14.793	9.192	Zapote Bridge; Las Piñas-Muntinlupa District Engineering Office–Cavite Sub District Engineering Office highway boundary (Southern terminus. Countinues south as N62 (Aguinaldo Highway).	
1.000 mi = 1.609 km; 1.000 km = 0.621 mi: Incomplete access

== See also ==
- Del Pilar Street
- Harrison Avenue
