= Alabang–Zapote Road =

Road in the Philippines

Coordinates: 14°26′12″N 121°0′24″E

Alabang–Zapote Road
- Calle Real; Real Street; Zapote–Alabang Road
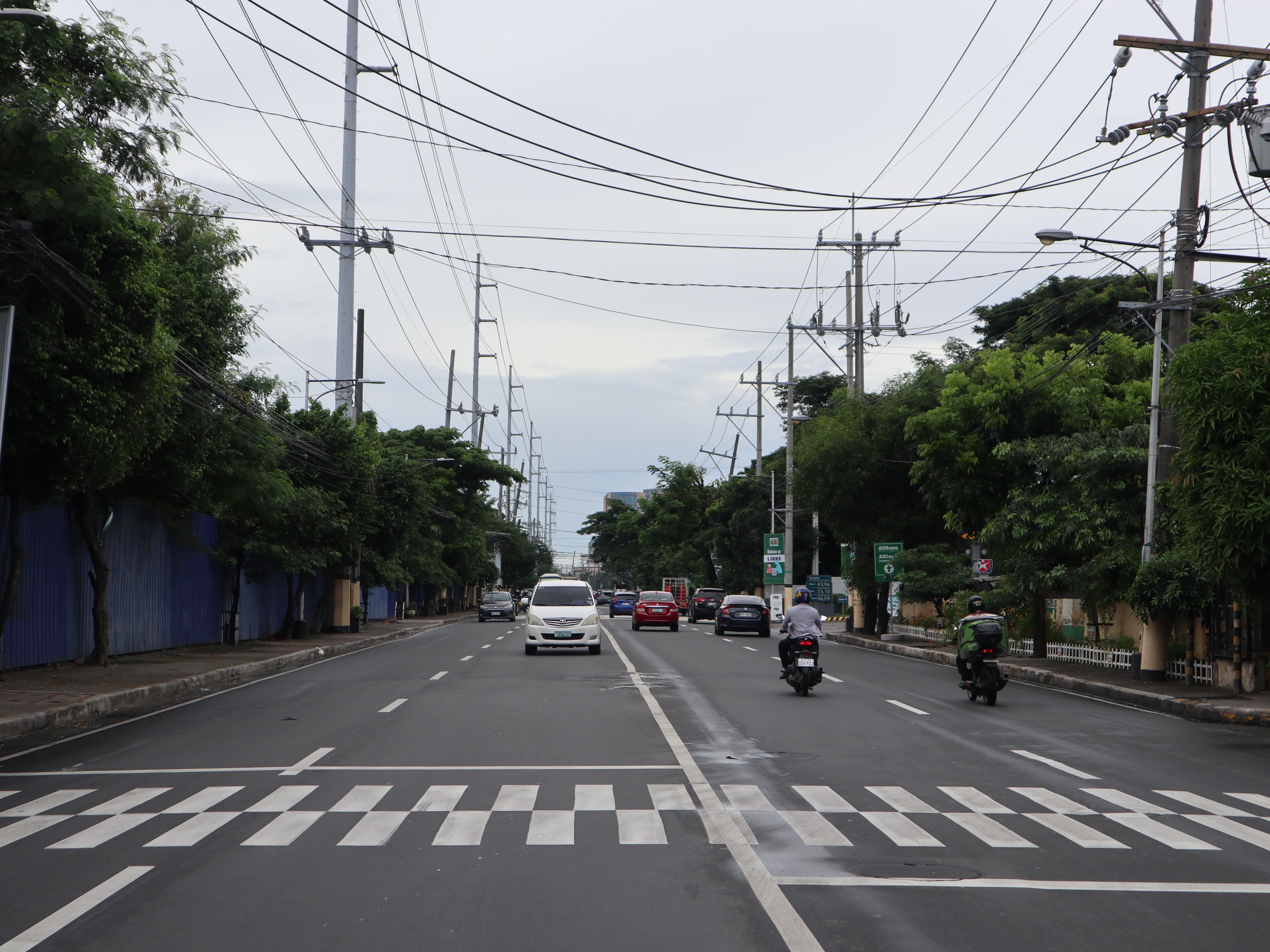
- Alabang–Zapote Road in Las Piñas

Route information
- Maintained by Department of Public Works and Highways and Metropolitan Manila Development Authority
- Length: 10.9 km (6.8 mi) Approximate length; including spur in Alabang
- Component highways: N411

Major junctions
- West end: E3 (Coastal Road) / N62 (Aguinaldo Boulevard) in Bacoor
- N62 (Diego Cera Avenue)
- East end: N1 (Manila South Road) / N143 (Montillano Street) / East Service Road in Muntinlupa

Location
- Country: Philippines
- Regions: Metro Manila, Calabarzon
- Provinces: Cavite
- Major cities: Bacoor, Las Piñas, and Muntinlupa

Highway system
- Roads in the Philippines; Highways; Expressways; List
← N410	→ N413

Alabang–Zapote Road is a four-lane national road which travels east–west through the southern limits of Metro Manila, Philippines. It runs parallel to Dr. Santos Avenue in the north and is named after the two barangays it links: Alabang, Muntinlupa and Zapote in Bacoor and Las Piñas.

From its eastern terminus at an interchange with South Luzon Expressway's Alabang Exit, East Service Road, Manila South Road, and Montillano Street, the road runs westwards for approximately 10.9 kilometers (6.8 mi) to the junction with Diego Cera Avenue. Since 1997, it has also extended further west for several hundred meters, connecting Las Piñas to its present terminus at Coastal Road (R-1) in Bacoor, Cavite.

The road carries more than 70,000 vehicles per day as of 2016 and suffers from traffic jams. The Metropolitan Manila Development Authority (MMDA) listed Alabang–Zapote Road as a major traffic bottleneck point or choke point, and the Unified Vehicular Volume Reduction Program (UVVRP) or "number coding" scheme, is modified for the road to no longer include window hours.

The entire route is designated National Route 411 (N411) of the Philippine highway network.

== Route description ==
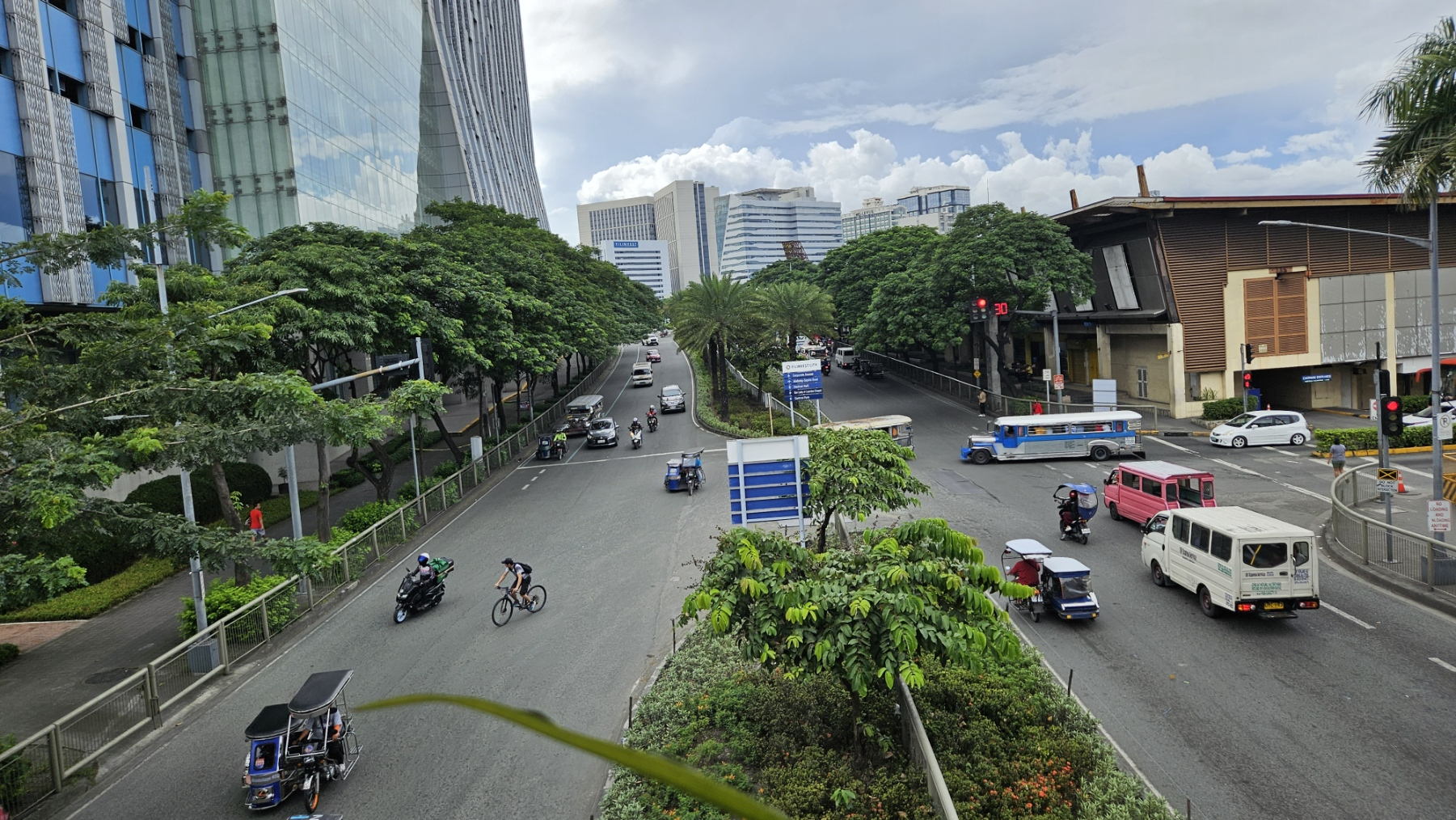
Alabang–Zapote Road's section also known as Spectrum Midway in Filinvest City, Muntinlupa

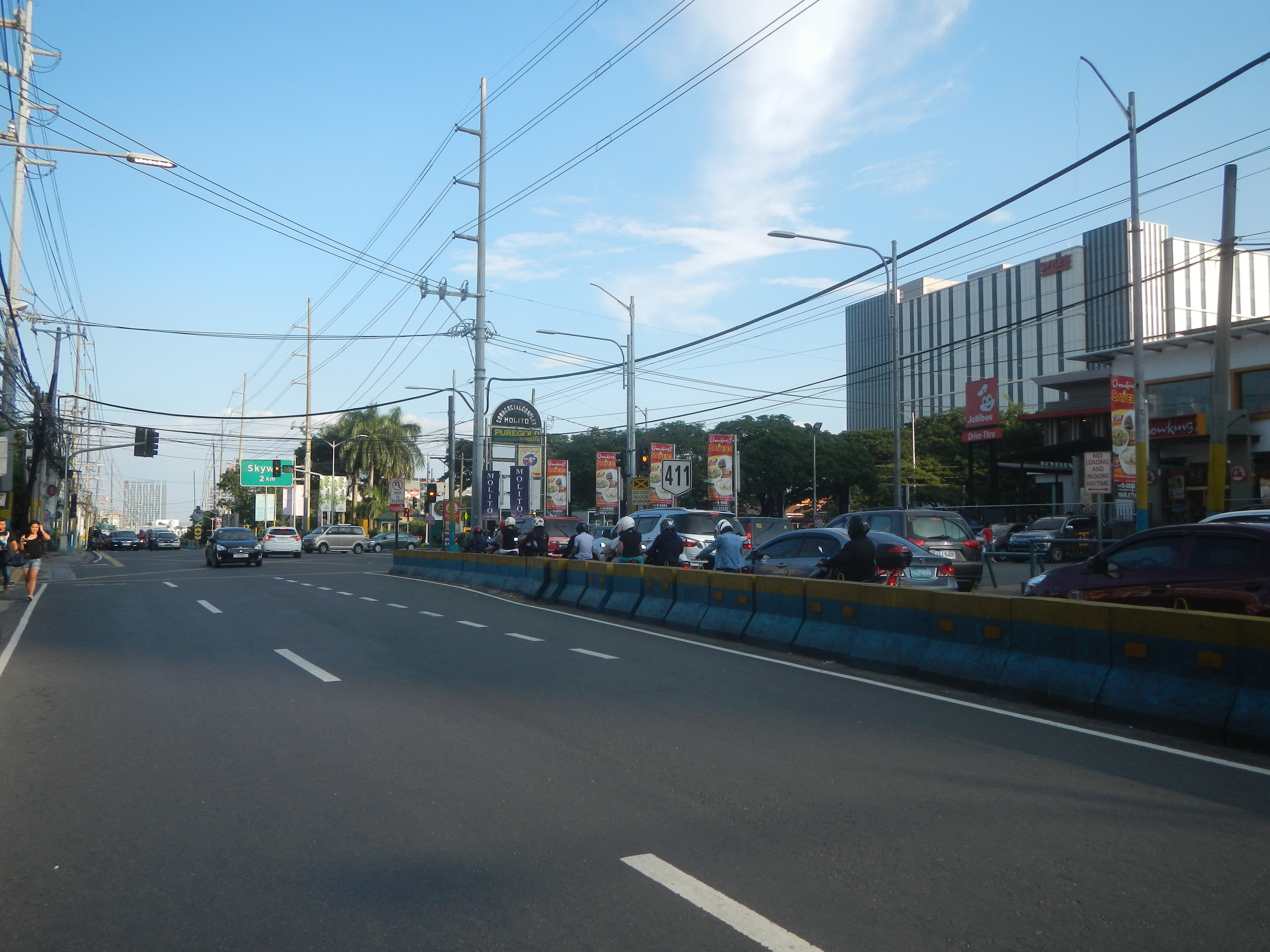
Alabang–Zapote Road near Alabang Town Center in Muntinlupa

The road begins at the junction of Manila South Road (National Highway), Montillano Street, East Service Road, and South Luzon Expressway's Alabang Exit in Alabang, Muntinlupa, below the Alabang Viaduct and Skyway Extension. A spur carrying southbound traffic also branches the highway to the front of Starmall Alabang at Manila South Road. It then crosses into Filinvest City, Barangay Cupang, and Barangay Ayala Alabang. In Filinvest City, the road is interrupted due to realignment brought out by its development. The gap is filled by a segment of Bridgeway Avenue between West Service Road and Spectrum Midway before resuming as short frontage roads parallel to Skyway's South Station Exit ramp.

West of Investment Drive (the northern extension of Daang Hari Road) at Madrigal Business Park, it enters Las Piñas and goes past the commercial and residential areas of the city. Near its western terminus, the road passes over the intersection with P. Diego Cera Avenue (Quirino Avenue) and crosses the Zapote River into Bacoor, Cavite, via the Alabang–Zapote Flyover. Below the flyover, surface-level traffic crosses the river via the parallel Zapote Bridges—Zapote Bridge 2 (also known as Zapote–Alabang (Tertiary Road)) and Zapote Bridge 3 (also known as Zapote–Alabang Access Road)). Upon descending in Bacoor, the highway (N411) continues for a short segment—also designated as the Zapote–Alabang Flyover to Cavitex—before ending at the Longos Junction, where it connects with National Route 62 (Aguinaldo Boulevard) and the Manila–Cavite Expressway (CAVITEX).

=== Traffic ===
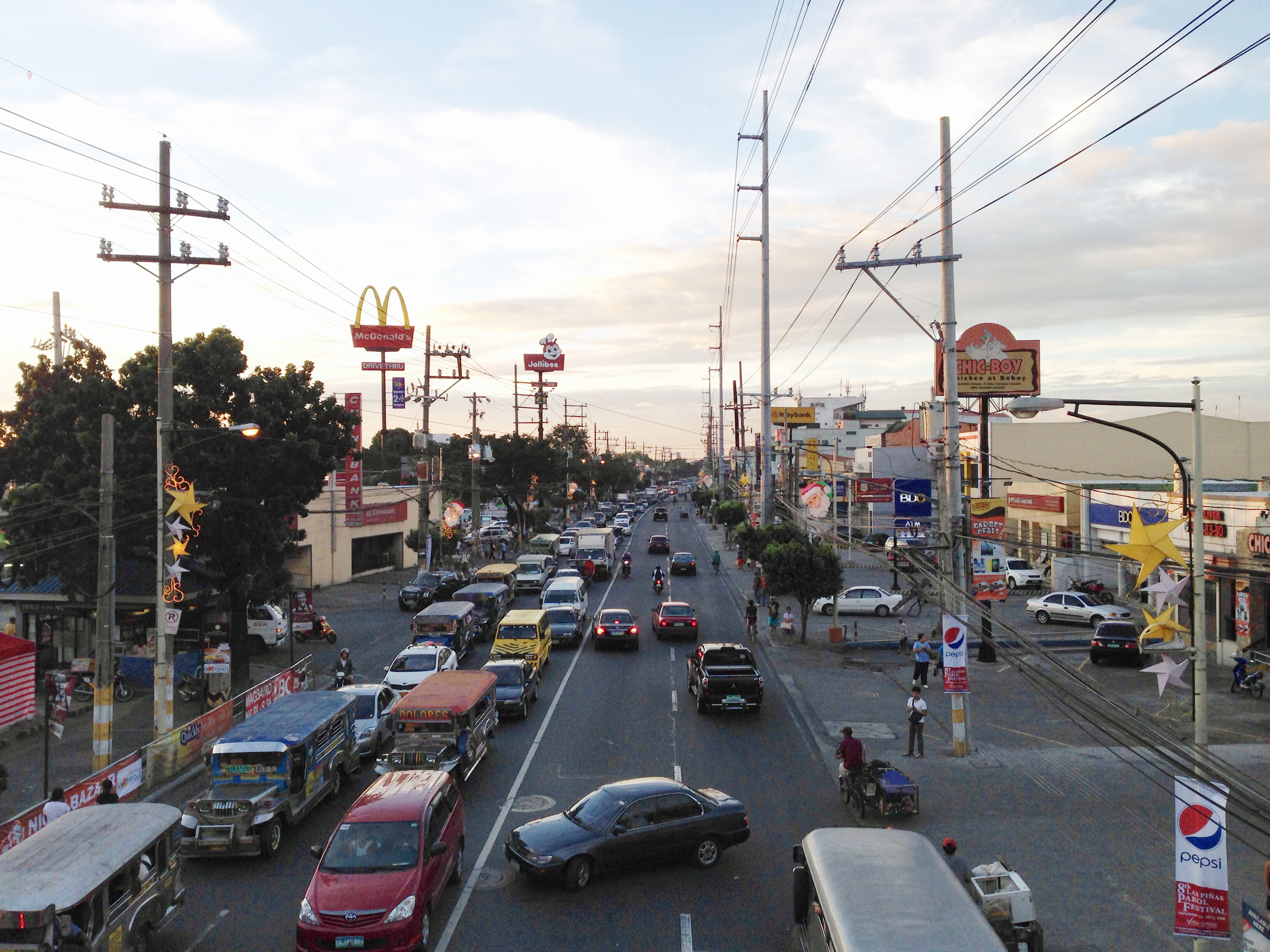
Late afternoon rush hour along Alabang–Zapote Road near Pamplona in 2013.

As of July 2016, the Las Piñas Traffic Management Office reported that more than 70,000 vehicles were travelling on Alabang–Zapote Road daily, already reaching above its allowable capacity. The road gained notoriety for its traffic jams, and it is listed by the Metropolitan Manila Development Authority as a major traffic bottleneck area in south Metro Manila, along with other major roads leading to Ninoy Aquino International Airport, like Sucat Road, Andrews Avenue, and Domestic Road. The Unified Vehicular Volume Reduction Program (UVVRP), or the "coding" scheme, is modified for Alabang–Zapote Road to have no "window hours".

== History ==
Alabang–Zapote Road follows an old Spanish coastal trail that linked the Province of Manila to La Laguna and other southern provinces. It was called Calle Real (Spanish for "royal street") or Camino Real (Spanish for "royal way"), which spanned from Ermita to Muntinlupa. It was also designated as part of Highway 1 (especially during the American colonial era) and of Manila South Road, which spanned from Manila to Sorsogon province. Currently, only the road's section in Las Piñas and Muntinlupa is called Calle Real or Real Street as an alternative name for the road. The rest of the route was renamed to Del Pilar Street in Manila, Harrison Avenue in Pasay, Quirino Avenue in Parañaque, and Diego Cera Avenue in Las Piñas.

The road was extended to the northwest towards Coastal Road in Bacoor in 1997 with the construction of the four-lane Alabang-Zapote Centennial Flyover (now Zapote Flyover) to ease the increasing traffic volume along the road. On July 16, 1998, the road's section between Alabang, Muntinlupa and Zapote, Las Piñas was renamed Filemon C. Aguilar Avenue, after the former Las Piñas–Muntinlupa representative, by virtue of Republic Act No. 8714. The road's section in Alabang, particularly between Filinvest and Bridgeway Avenues, was also realigned between 2006 and 2012 with the development of Filinvest Corporate City.

=== Proposed renaming ===
On December 18, 2008, House Bill No. 5659 was filed by seven lawmakers, seeking to rename the road's segment in Las Piñas to General Edilberto Evangelista Avenue, in honor of the general who fought during the Philippine Revolution.

== Intersections ==
Intersections in the list below are arranged by kilometer number, based on numbers on kilometer stones from Rizal Park in Manila, the Kilometer Zero.

=== Mainline ===
Province	City/Municipality	km	mi	Destinations	Notes
Cavite	Bacoor			E3 (CAVITEX) / N62 (Aguinaldo Boulevard) – Kawit, Manila	Western terminus. Access to Zapote Interchange of CAVITEX. No left turn allowed from Alabang–Zapote Road.
Cavite	Bacoor			Zapote–Alabang Flyover to Cavitex	The short westernmost extension of the N411 highway starting from the flyover's descent in Bacoor, linking the corridor to the Longos Junction (N62) and the Cavitex.
Cavite	Bacoor			Las Piñas-Talaba Diversion Road	No access from opposite direction
Cavite	Bacoor			West end of Zapote Flyover	
Zapote River				Zapote Bridge 2 (Zapote–Alabang Tertiary Road); Zapote Bridge 3 (Zapote–Alabang Access Road)	
Las Piñas		14.773	9.180	N62 (Diego Cera Avenue)	
Las Piñas		15.000	9.321	East end of Zapote Flyover	
Las Piñas				Fruto Santos Avenue (Tramo Street)	
Las Piñas		16.400	10.190	Doña Manuela Avenue	
Las Piñas		16.800	10.439	C.V. Starr Avenue	Serves Starmall Las Piñas and BF Resort
Las Piñas		17.500	10.874	Manila Times Street / Aria Street	Serves University of Perpetual Help System DALTA - Las Piñas
Las Piñas		18.670	11.601	CAA Road / BF Resort Avenue	Serves BF Resort
Las Piñas		20.073	12.473	Marcos Alvarez Avenue	
Las Piñas		22.100	13.732	Concha Cruz Drive	Serves BF Homes
Muntinlupa		22.386	13.910	Investment Drive – Daang Hari, San Pedro	
Muntinlupa		22.550	14.012	Acacia Avenue	Serves Madrigal Business Park and Ayala Alabang Village
Muntinlupa		22.714	14.114	Don Manolo Drive	Serves Alabang Hills and San Beda College Alabang
Muntinlupa		23.048	14.321	Madrigal Avenue	Serves Alabang Town Center and Ayala Alabang Village
Muntinlupa		24.023	14.927	Filinvest Avenue	Left turns allowed from Skyway only
Muntinlupa				Skyway	South Station (Alabang-Zapote) exit of Skyway; exit and entrance
Muntinlupa				North Bridgeway	Serves Northgate Cyberzone
Muntinlupa		24.381	15.150	North Bridgeway / Spectrum Midway	Serves Vivere Hotel Alabang and Festival Alabang
Muntinlupa		24.707	15.352	Corporate Avenue	Serves South Station, Filinvest Corporate City, Crimson Hotel and Festival Alabang
Muntinlupa		24.956	15.507	N411 (Alabang-Zapote Road) / Market Street	No left turns
Muntinlupa		25.099	15.596	N1 (Manila South Road) / N142 (Montillano Street) / East Service Road	Eastern terminus. Access from Manila South Road only.
1.000 mi = 1.609 km; 1.000 km = 0.621 mi: Incomplete access

=== Spur ===
The entire route is located in Muntinlupa. This 258-meter (846 ft) segment in Alabang has no official kilometer count.

km	mi	Destinations	Notes
		N411 (Alabang-Zapote Road) / Market Street	Western terminus. Connection with main route. No left turns from the westbound lane of Alabang–Zapote Road mainline.
		N1 (Manila South Road)	Eastern terminus. Access to Manila South Road northbound is closed; accessible via U-turn slot beneath Alabang Viaduct.
1.000 mi = 1.609 km; 1.000 km = 0.621 mi: Incomplete access

== Landmarks ==
This is from the road's western end in Bacoor, Cavite, to its eastern end in Muntinlupa:

=== Bacoor ===
- Zapote–CAVITEX Interchange
- Longos Flyover
- Zapote Bridge

=== Las Piñas ===
- SM Center Las Piñas
- University of Perpetual Help System DALTA
- Robinsons Las Piñas
- SM Southmall
- Molito Lifestyle Center

=== Muntinlupa ===
- Alabang Town Center
- Westgate Center
- Northgate Cyberzone
- Alabang South Station
