= Longos Flyover =

Flyover in Cavite, Philippines

- Longos Coastal Flyover Plus 1st Approach Road
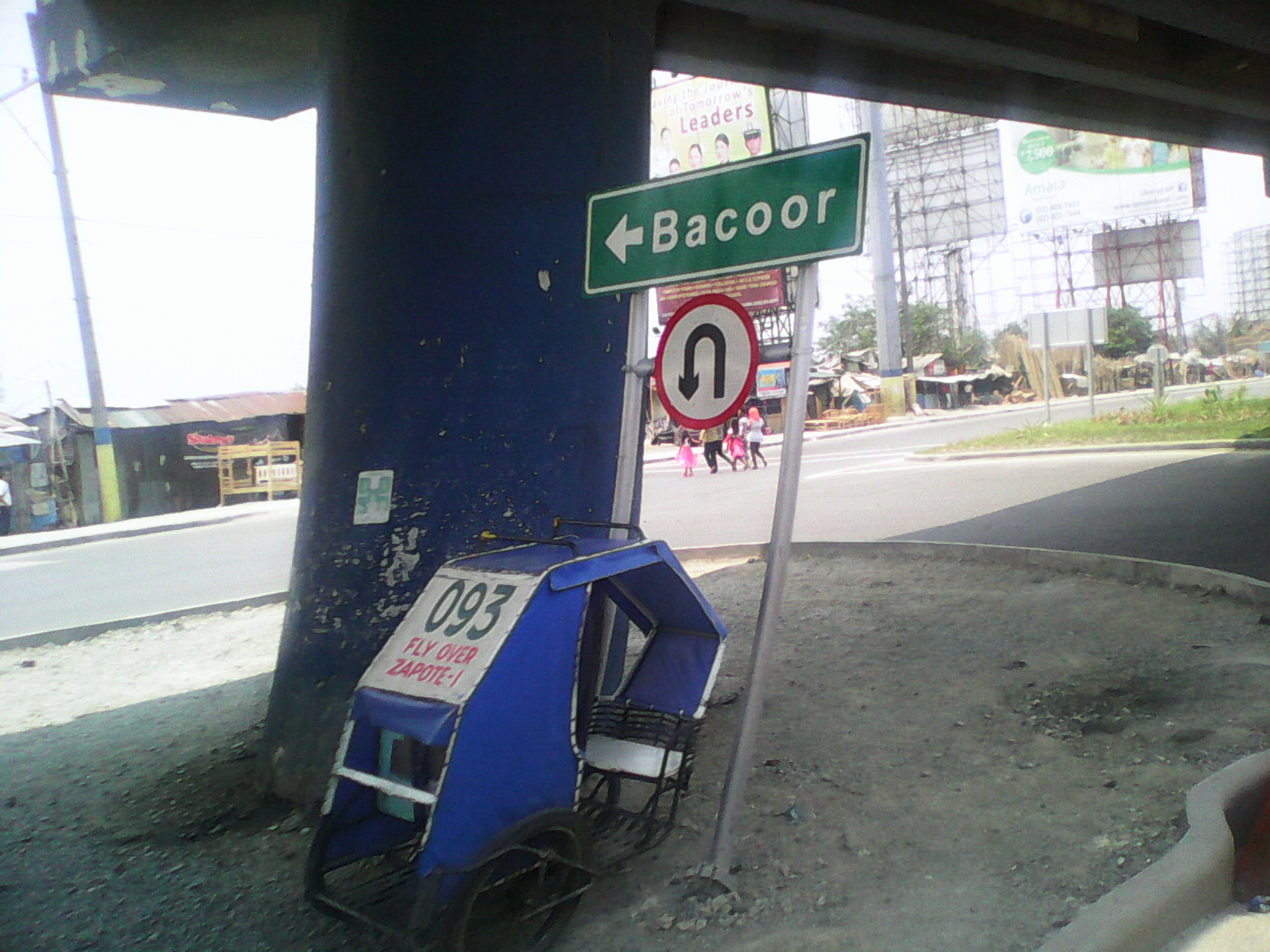
- Underside view of the Longos Flyover in Bacoor, Cavite
- Interactive map of Longos Flyover

Location
- Bacoor, Cavite, Philippines
- Coordinates: 14°28′08.5″N 120°57′45.8″E
- Roads at junction: E3 (CAVITEX); N62 (Aguinaldo Boulevard); N411 (Alabang–Zapote Road); Las Piñas–Talaba Diversion Road

Construction
- Type: Two-level flyover
- Maintained by: Department of Public Works and Highways

The Longos Flyover, also known as Longos Coastal Flyover, is a flyover located in Bacoor, Cavite, Philippines. It forms part of the Longos coastal road section.

The Longos Flyover is a 382-meter road section. It forms part of Aguinaldo Boulevard, and is maintained by the Department of Public Works and Highways (DPWH) through its Cavite 3rd District Engineering Office. The flyover provides an elevated connection and traffic access between Aguinaldo Boulevard and the Manila–Cavite Expressway (CAVITEX). In DPWH records, the infrastructure section is officially identified as "Longos Coastal Flyover Plus 1st Approach Road," referring to the flyover structure together with its initial approach road segment connecting Aguinaldo Boulevard to CAVITEX.

== History ==
In 2021, major construction and traffic management works were implemented around the Modified Zapote interchange area of the Manila–Cavite Expressway (CAVITEX), including the Kawit–Bacoor separator and Longos down ramp. As part of the scheme intended to improve traffic flow and lane capacity, counterflow traffic arrangements were introduced during peak hours, and the works were planned for completion by May 19, 2021.

In November 2025, a portion of Longos Flyover, along with Alabang–Zapote Road from Las Piñas–Talaba Diversion Road to CAVITEX, was affected by scheduled power interruptions due to maintenance activities conducted by the Manila Electric Company (Meralco).
