= Elpidio Quirino Avenue =

Major north-south collector road in Parañaque, Philippines

Coordinates: 14°29′58″N 120°59′27″E

R-2
- Quirino Avenue
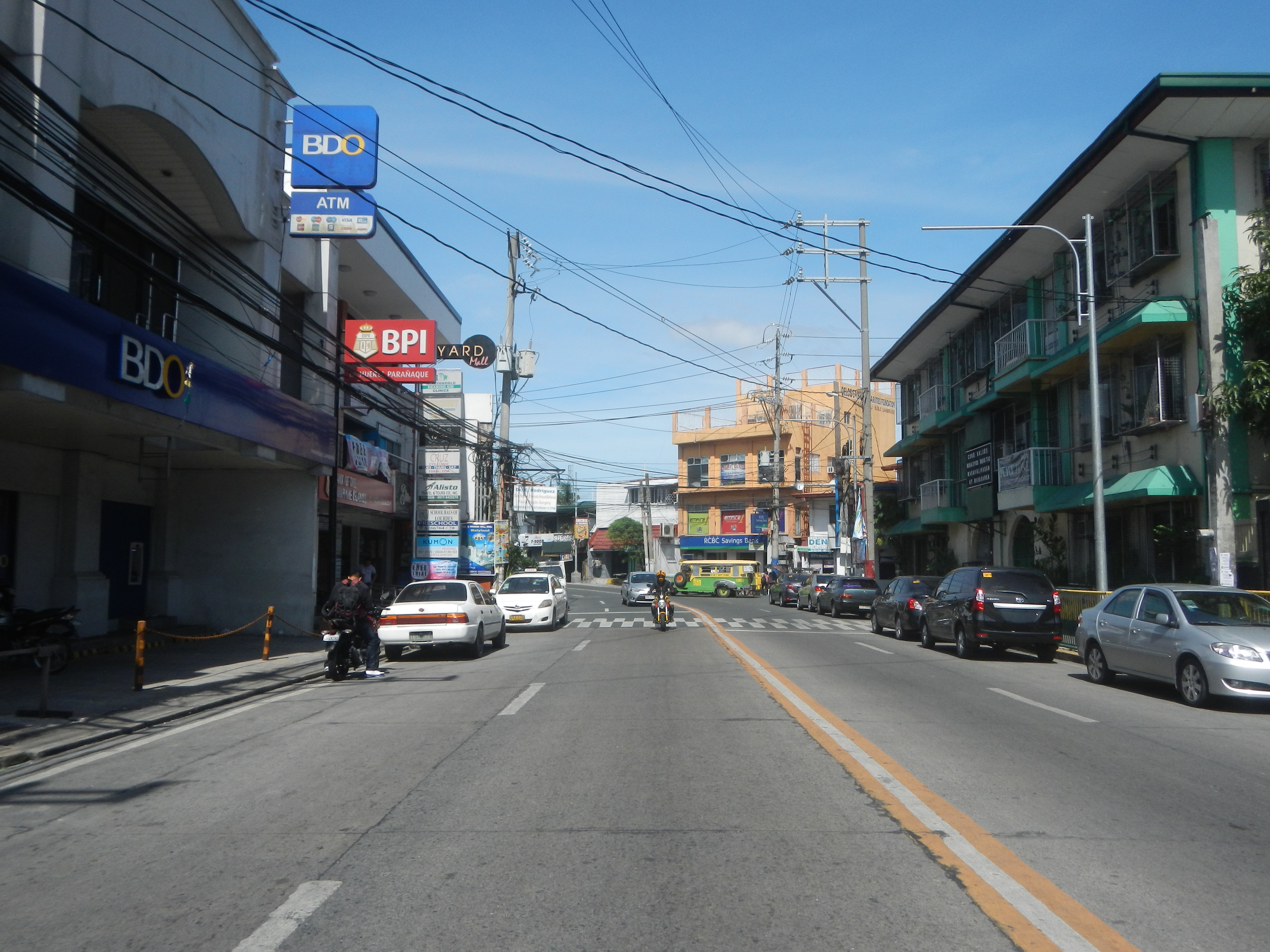
- View northbound towards the Don Galo bridge in La Huerta
- Interactive map of Elpidio Quirino Avenue
- Former names: Calle Real / Camino Real; Manila South Road; Cavite-Manila South Road; Mexico Road
- Part of: R-2 R-2; N62 south of NAIA Road
- Namesake: Elpidio Quirino
- Maintained by: Department of Public Works and Highways - Metro Manila 2nd District Engineering Office
- Length: 5.6 km (3.5 mi)
- Location: Parañaque
- North end: Harrison Street, Taft Avenue Extension, and Redemptorist Road in Baclaran
- Major junctions: N192 (Airport Road); N63 (NAIA Road); Victor Medina Street
- South end: N62 (Diego Cera Avenue) and Villareal Street in San Dionisio

Elpidio Quirino Avenue, also known simply as Quirino Avenue, is a major north-south collector road in Parañaque, southern Metro Manila, Philippines. It is a four-lane undivided arterial running parallel to Roxas Boulevard and its extension, the Manila–Cavite Expressway, to the west from Baclaran at Parañaque's border with Pasay in the north to San Dionisio right by the border with Las Piñas in the south. It is a continuation of F.B. Harrison Street from Pasay and was originally a segment of the coastal highway called Calle Real. The entire road is a component of Radial Road 2 (R-2) of Manila's arterial road network, while its segment south of NAIA Road is a component of National Route 62 (N62) of the Philippine highway network. It was named after President Elpidio Quirino. The road's name is also applied alternatively to Diego Cera Avenue in Las Piñas.

== Route description ==
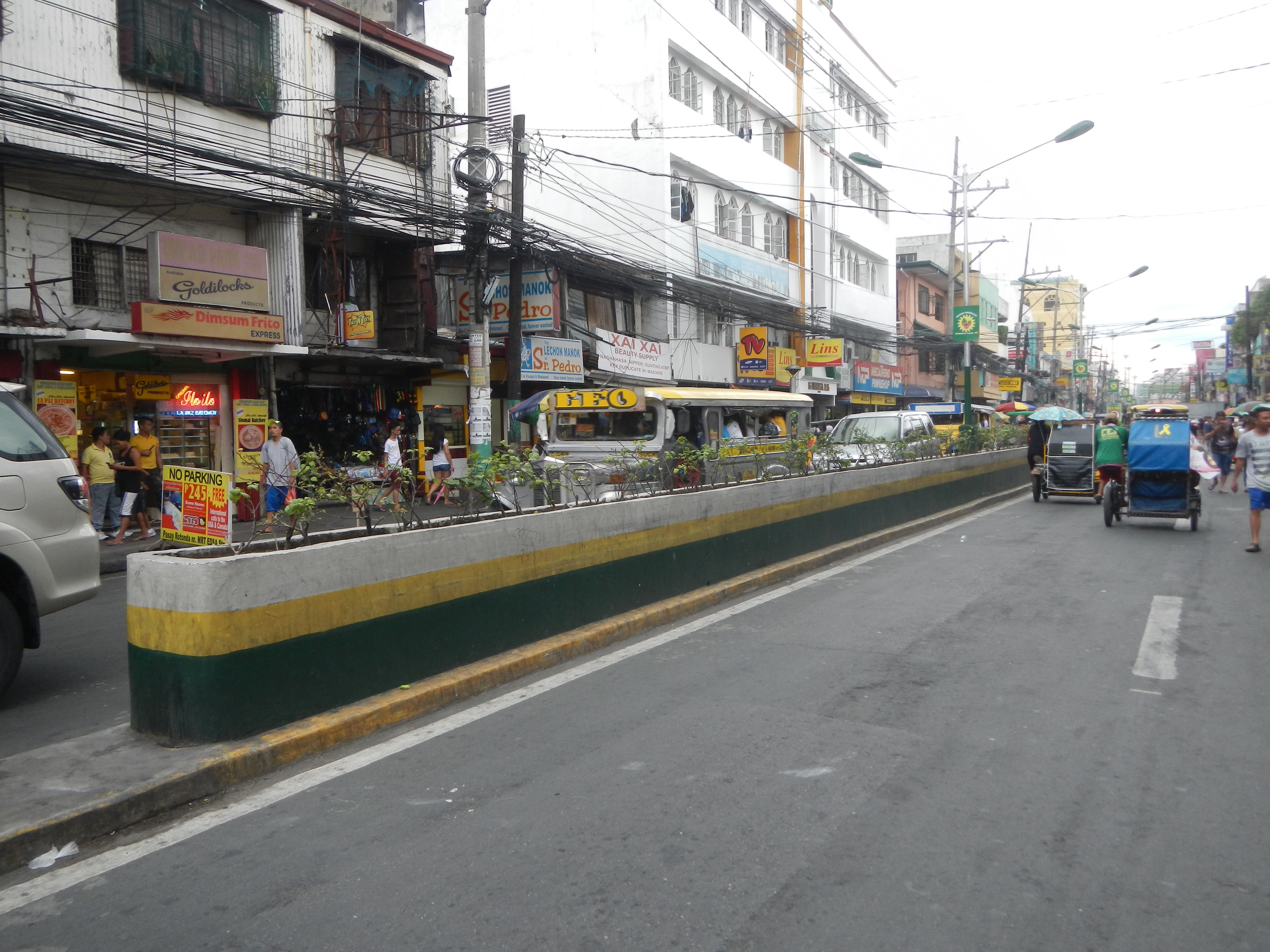
Quirino Avenue in Baclaran

The street starts at the intersection with F.B. Harrison Street, Redemptorist Road and Taft Avenue (Taft Avenue Extension) near Baclaran station of Manila LRT-1. It travels south across the crowded marketplace of Baclaran, just behind the popular Baclaran Church, and crosses Airport Road into barangay Tambo. The street then runs parallel to the Estero de Tripa de Gallina to the east, which serves as Parañaque's border with Pasay, and heads for the junction with NAIA Road and the elevated NAIA Expressway. A few hundred meters south, the road enters the barangay Don Galo and crosses the Parañaque River into the old center (poblacion) of Parañaque called La Huerta. It then curves slightly upon reaching St. Andrew's Cathedral and straightens back as it heads south into barangay San Dionisio. The road intersects with Victor Medina Street near the Kabihasnan Entrance to the Manila-Cavite Expressway and ends just a few hundred meters south as it enters barangay Manuyo Uno in Las Piñas, where it continues as Diego Cera Avenue.

== History ==
Elpidio Quirino Avenue marks the original shoreline of Manila Bay in Parañaque pueblo as it existed during the Spanish colonial period. It forms part of an old Spanish coastal highway that linked the Province of Manila to La Laguna and other southern provinces, with segments later known as Manila South Road. It was called Calle Real or Camino Real (Spanish for "royal street"), which spanned from Ermita to Muntinlupa, Rizal (now part of Metro Manila). Due to its accessibility to Cavite, it was also known as Cavite-Manila South Road, including the present-day Aguinaldo Highway. The road was renamed Mexico Road in 1964, which was designated as "The Year of Philippine-Mexican Friendship." It was the location of Camp Dewey, an early U.S. military installation during the Philippine–American War. This "camp in Tambo" was converted into a Philippine Army camp in 1936. However, by 2003, the military camp known as Camp Claudio has been transformed into a housing and urban development site.

Presently, only the Las Piñas and Muntinlupa sections are called Calle Real or Real Street as an alternative name for the road. The Parañaque portion has been renamed Elpidio Quirino Avenue, while those on Manila and Pasay have been renamed Del Pilar Street and F.B. Harrison Street, respectively.

== Intersections ==
Intersections are numbered by kilometer posts, with Rizal Park in Manila designated as kilometer zero.

Province	City/Municipality	km	mi	Destinations	Notes
Parañaque–Las Piñas boundary				Villareal Street	Southern terminus. Continues south as N62 (Diego Cera Avenue).
Parañaque				Victor Medina Street	Traffic light intersection.
Parañaque River		9	5.6	Don Galo Bridge	
Parañaque				Dimatimbangan Street / J.P. Rizal Street	
Parañaque				N194 (NAIA Road)	Traffic light intersection.
Parañaque				T. Claudio Street	
Parañaque				Airport Road	Traffic light intersection.
Parañaque				Taft Avenue Extension; R-2 / Redemptorist Road	Northern terminus; continues north as Harrison Street. North end of R-2 concurrency.
1.000 mi = 1.609 km; 1.000 km = 0.621 mi: Concurrency terminus; Incomplete access
