= Radial Road 2 =

Road in the Philippines

R-2 Radial Road 2
- R-2 Road
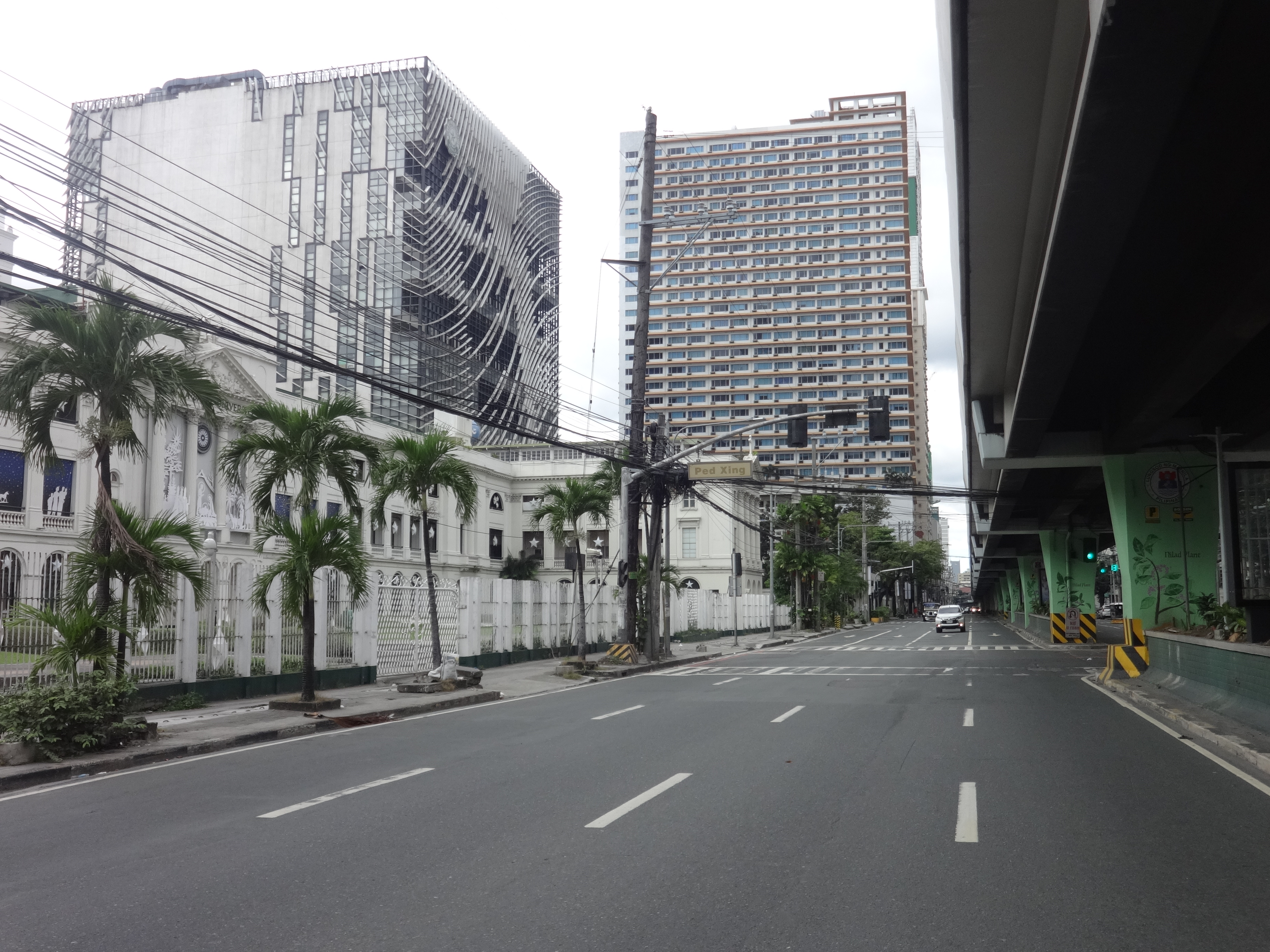
- Taft Avenue, a portion of R-2, in Malate, Manila

Route information
- Maintained by the Department of Public Works and Highways and the Metropolitan Manila Development Authority (Note: In Metro Manila only.)
- Length: 56.51 km (35.11 mi)
- Component highways: N170 from Manila to Pasay; N62 from Parañaque to Bacoor; N419 from Bacoor to Dasmariñas; N410 from Silang to Tagaytay

Major junctions
- North end: N150 / N170 (Padre Burgos Avenue) in Manila
- South end: N410 (Tagaytay–Nasugbu Highway) / N421 (Tagaytay–Calamba Road) in Tagaytay

Location
- Country: Philippines
- Provinces: Cavite
- Major cities: Bacoor, Dasmariñas, Imus, Las Piñas, Manila, Parañaque, Pasay, and Tagaytay
- Towns: Silang

Highway system
- Roads in the Philippines; Highways; Expressways; List

Radial Road 2 (R-2), informally known as the R-2 Road, is a network of roads and bridges which comprise the second arterial road of Metro Manila in the Philippines. Spanning some 56.51 kilometers (35.11 mi), it connects the cities and municipalities of Bacoor, Dasmariñas, Imus, Las Piñas, Manila, Parañaque, Pasay, Silang, and Tagaytay in Cavite and Metro Manila.

== Route description ==
=== Taft Avenue ===
Between its northern terminus at the Lagusnilad underpass of Padre Burgos Avenue and Redemptorist Road in Pasay, R-2 is known as Taft Avenue. It serves the districts of Ermita and Malate, running underneath the Manila Light Rail Transit System Line 1 (LRT-1) towards Parañaque via Pasay.

=== Elpidio Quirino Avenue ===
Taft Avenue Extension merges with Elpidio Quirino Avenue at the intersection with Redemptorist Road near the Pasay–Parañaque border. This section of R-2 runs the entire length of Parañaque from Baclaran to San Dionisio.

=== Diego Cera Avenue ===
R-2 is known as Diego Cera Avenue in Las Piñas. It runs between the Parañaque–Las Piñas boundary and Alabang–Zapote Road.

=== Aguinaldo Highway ===
From Alabang–Zapote Road south to Tagaytay, R-2 is known as Aguinaldo Highway. It is the main north-south thoroughfare in the province of Cavite, linking Las Piñas in Metro Manila with Cavite, particularly the cities and municipalities of Bacoor, Imus, Dasmariñas, Silang, and Tagaytay. R-2 ends at the Tagaytay Rotunda, which provides the famous view of the Taal Lake.
