= N62 highway =

Road in the Philippines

Route 62

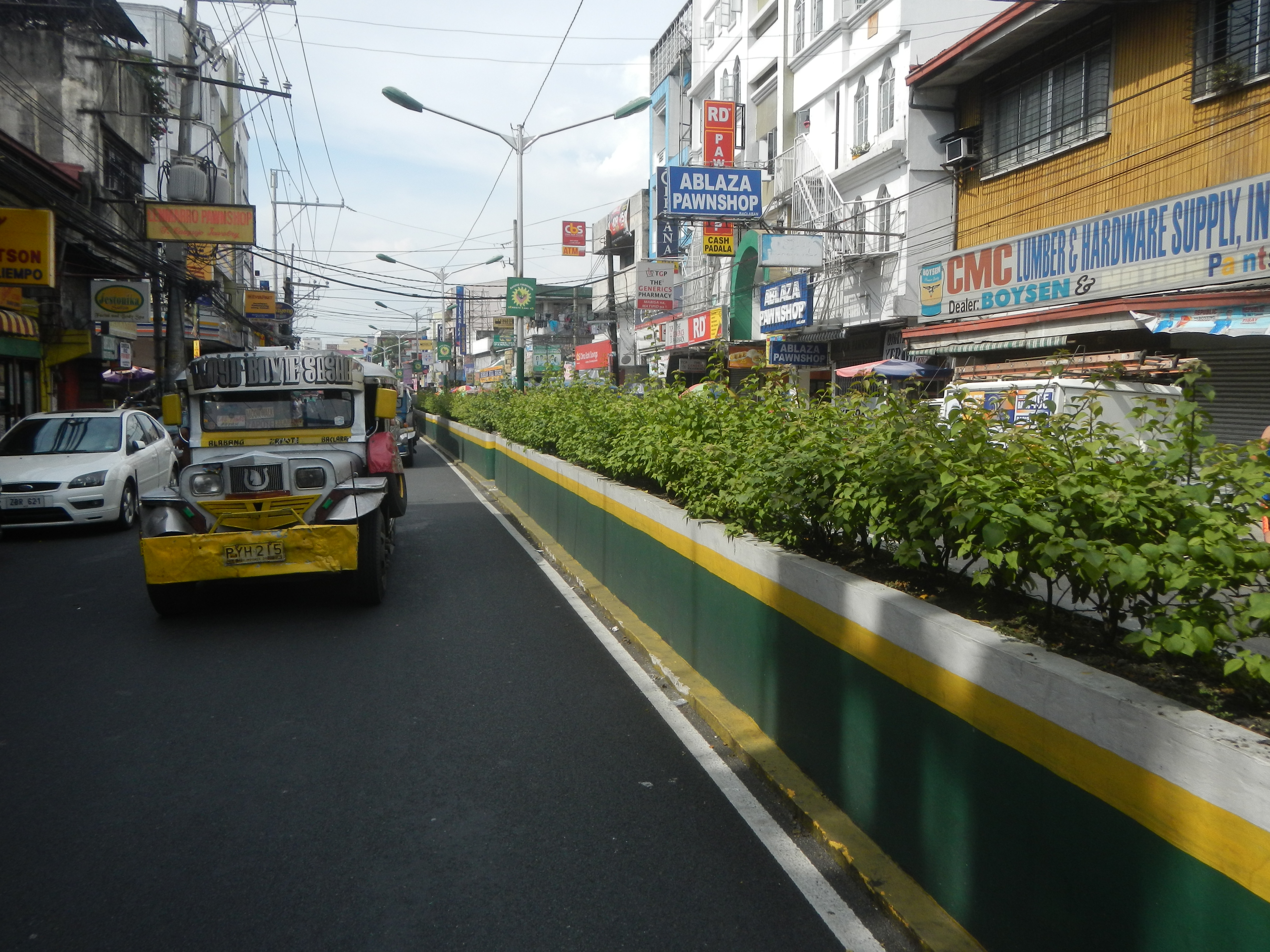
- Elpidio Quirino Avenue

Route information
- Maintained by the Department of Public Works and Highways

Parañaque–Noveleta
- Length: 11.639 km (7.232 mi)
- East end: N194 (NAIA Road) in Parañaque
- Major intersections: N411 (Alabang–Zapote Road) in Las Piñas; N62 (Aguinaldo Boulevard) in Bacoor; N419 (Aguinaldo Highway) in Bacoor; N400-2 (Covelandia Road) in Kawit; N64 (Antero Soriano Highway) / N400-2 in Kawit; N400-1 (Centennial Loop) in Kawit; E3 (CAVITEX) in Kawit; N400 (Noveleta-Rosario Diversion Road) in Kawit and Noveleta
- West end: N401 (Magdiwang Highway) in Noveleta

Noveleta–Cavite City
- Length: 7.771 km (4.829 mi)
- South end: N401 (Magdiwang Highway / Marseilla Street) in Noveleta
- Major intersections: N401-1 (Julian Felipe Boulevard) in Cavite City; N401-1 (Dra. Salamanca Road) in Cavite City
- North end: N401-1 (P. Burgos Extension) / Lopez Jaena Street in Cavite City

Aguinaldo Boulevard (Bacoor)
- Length: 1.3 km (0.81 mi) Approximate length
- From: N62 (Aguinaldo Highway) in Bacoor
- Major intersections: N411 (Alabang–Zapote Road)
- To: E3 (Manila–Cavite Expressway) in Bacoor

Location
- Country: Philippines
- Major cities: Parañaque, Las Piñas, Bacoor, Cavite City
- Towns: Noveleta, Kawit

Highway system
- Roads in the Philippines; Highways; Expressways; List
| ← N61 | → N63 |

National Route 62 (N62) forms part of the Philippine highway network. It runs south from Metro Manila to northeastern Cavite.

== Route description ==
Based on the designation by the Department of Public Works and Highways (DPWH), N62 consists of the following segments, from east to west:

=== Parañaque to Las Piñas ===
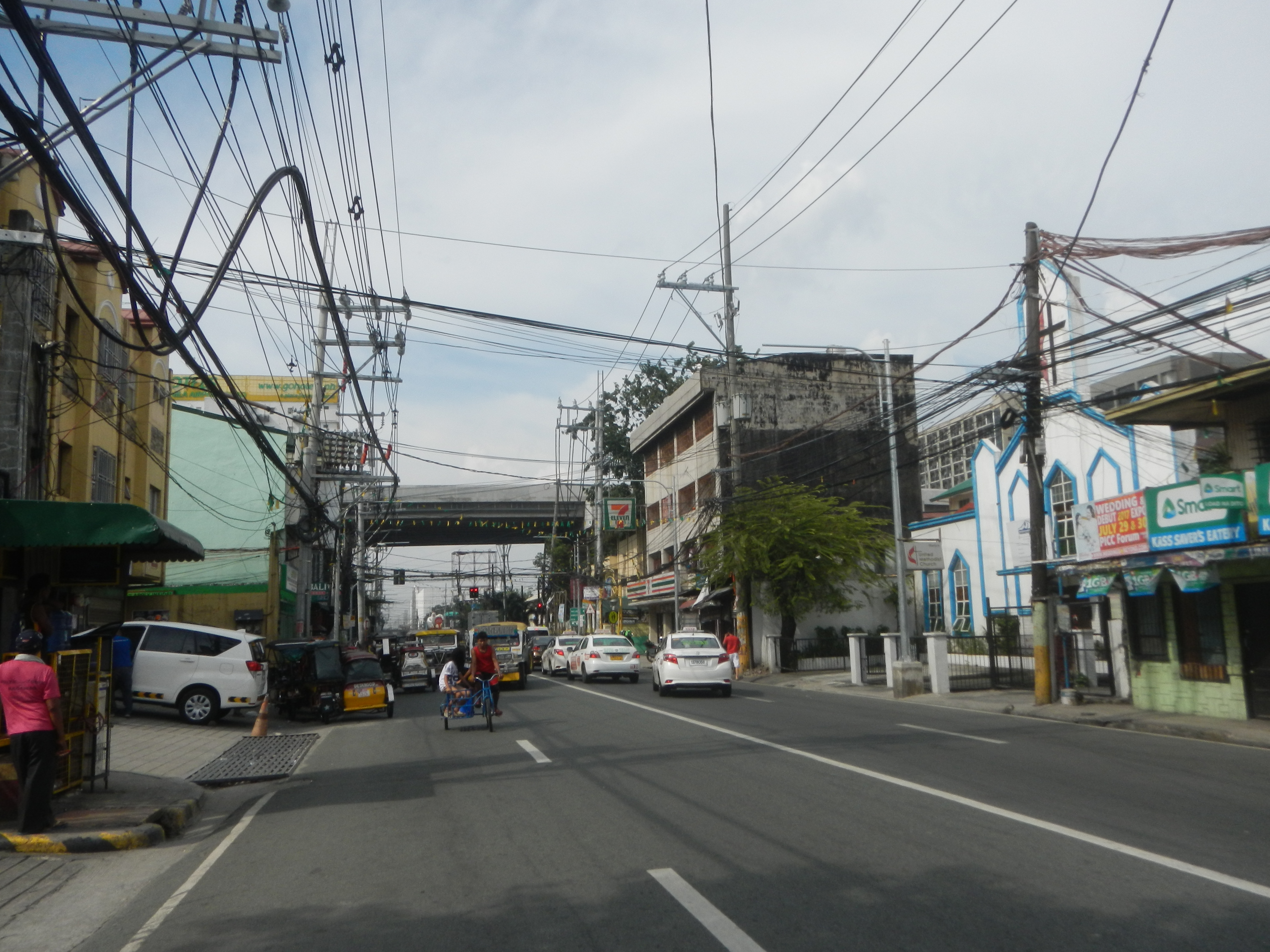
Quirino Avenue in Parañaque

N62 starts at the intersection with NAIA Road in Parañaque. The northern section forms a major north–south collector road in southern Metro Manila, Philippines. Originally a segment of the Calle Real, it is now a four-lane undivided arterial designated as a component of Manila's Radial Road 2 network. It runs parallel to Roxas Boulevard and its extension, the Manila–Cavite Expressway (Coastal Road). The northern section in Parañaque is called Elpidio Quirino Avenue, while the southern section in Las Piñas is Padre Diego Cera Avenue.

=== Bacoor ===
The southern section of the N62 forms part of the Emilio Aguinaldo Highway, also known as Cavite-Batangas Road and Manila West Road, from Zapote Bridge to Tirona Highway in Bacoor.

==== Aguinaldo Boulevard ====
From Bacoor Junction, N419 branches out from Aguinaldo Highway to Manila–Cavite Expressway's (CAVITEX) Bacoor (Longos) Exit as Aguinaldo Boulevard, a 6-lane, 1.3-kilometer (0.81 mi) thoroughfare serving the areas of Talaba, Zapote, and Longos in Bacoor. Longos Flyover, which carries the road over its junction with Alabang-Zapote Road and provides access to the northbound entrance to CAVITEX, is also part of N62.

=== Bacoor to Kawit ===
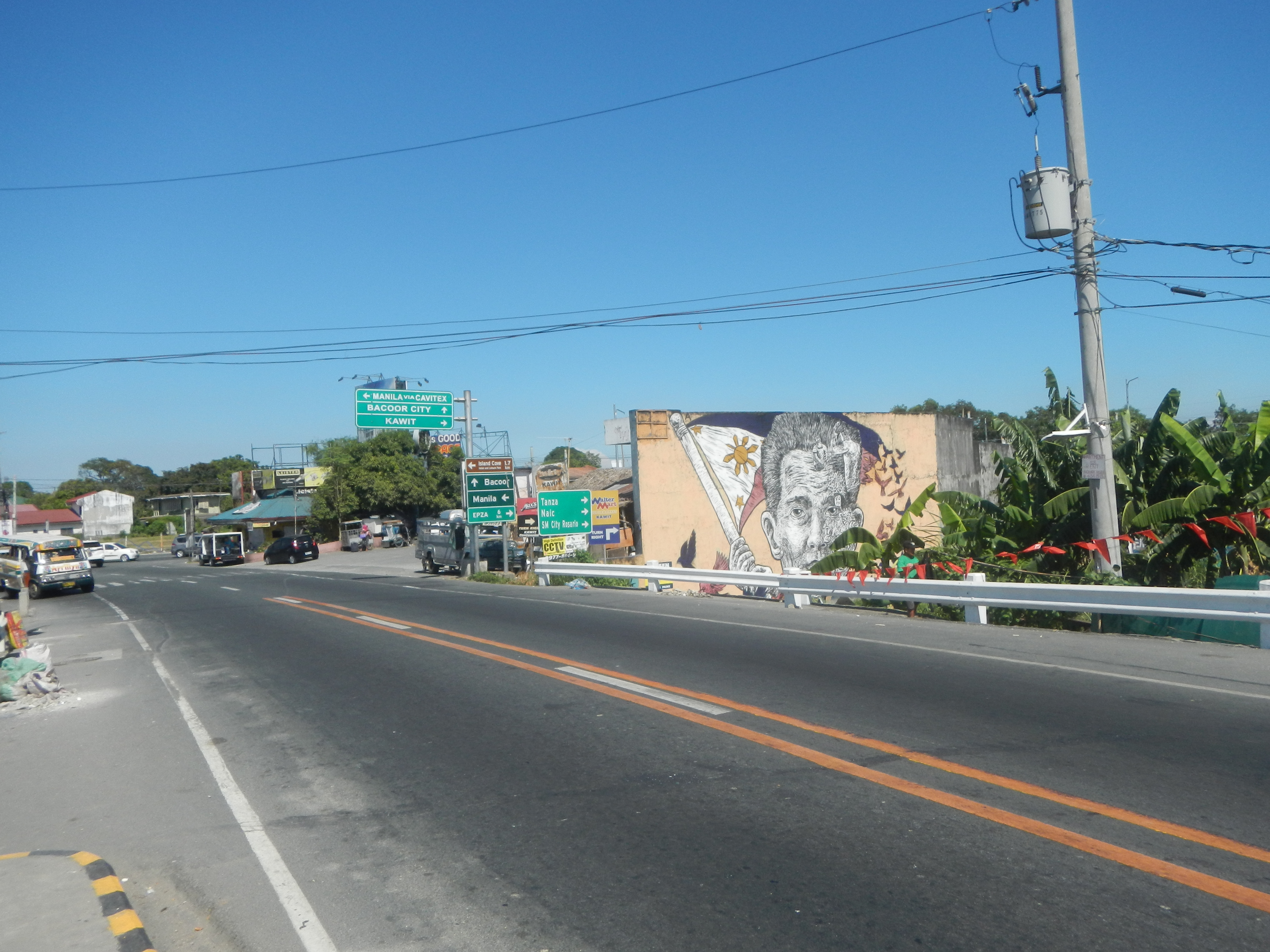
Tirona Highway in Kawit

At the intersection near SM City Bacoor, N62 turns west towards Kawit as Tirona Highway, while Aguinaldo Highway continues south as N419. It then meets its intersection with CAVITEX at the Binakayan and Marulas interchanges and traverses the Aguinaldo Shrine in Kawit.

=== Kawit to Noveleta ===
In Kawit, N62 turns south as the Magdiwang Highway and shifts towards a two-lane road in Barangay Magdalo, Kawit. It then becomes A. Bonifacio Street as it enters Noveleta. It then turns northwest at M. Salud Road and ends at the intersection with Magdiwang Highway. This junction serves as the transition point where Magdiwang Highway switches from a tertiary road known as Noveleta Diversion Road into N402.

The gap along Magdiwang Highway between the intersection and the western segment of N62, which runs from Noveleta to Cavite City, is bridged by N402. It runs north of the Noveleta Town Hall.

=== Noveleta to Cavite City ===
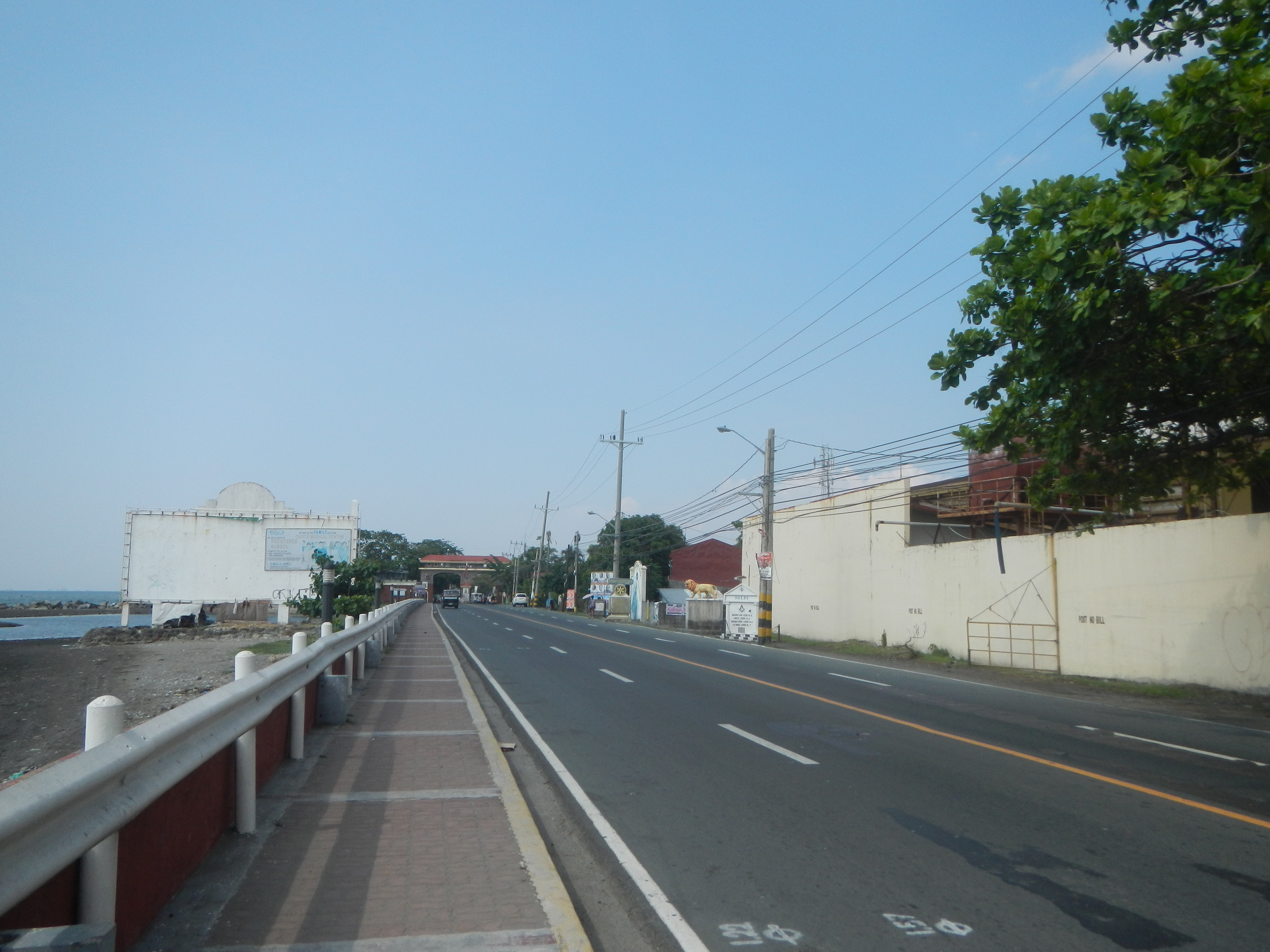
Manila–Cavite Road in Cavite City

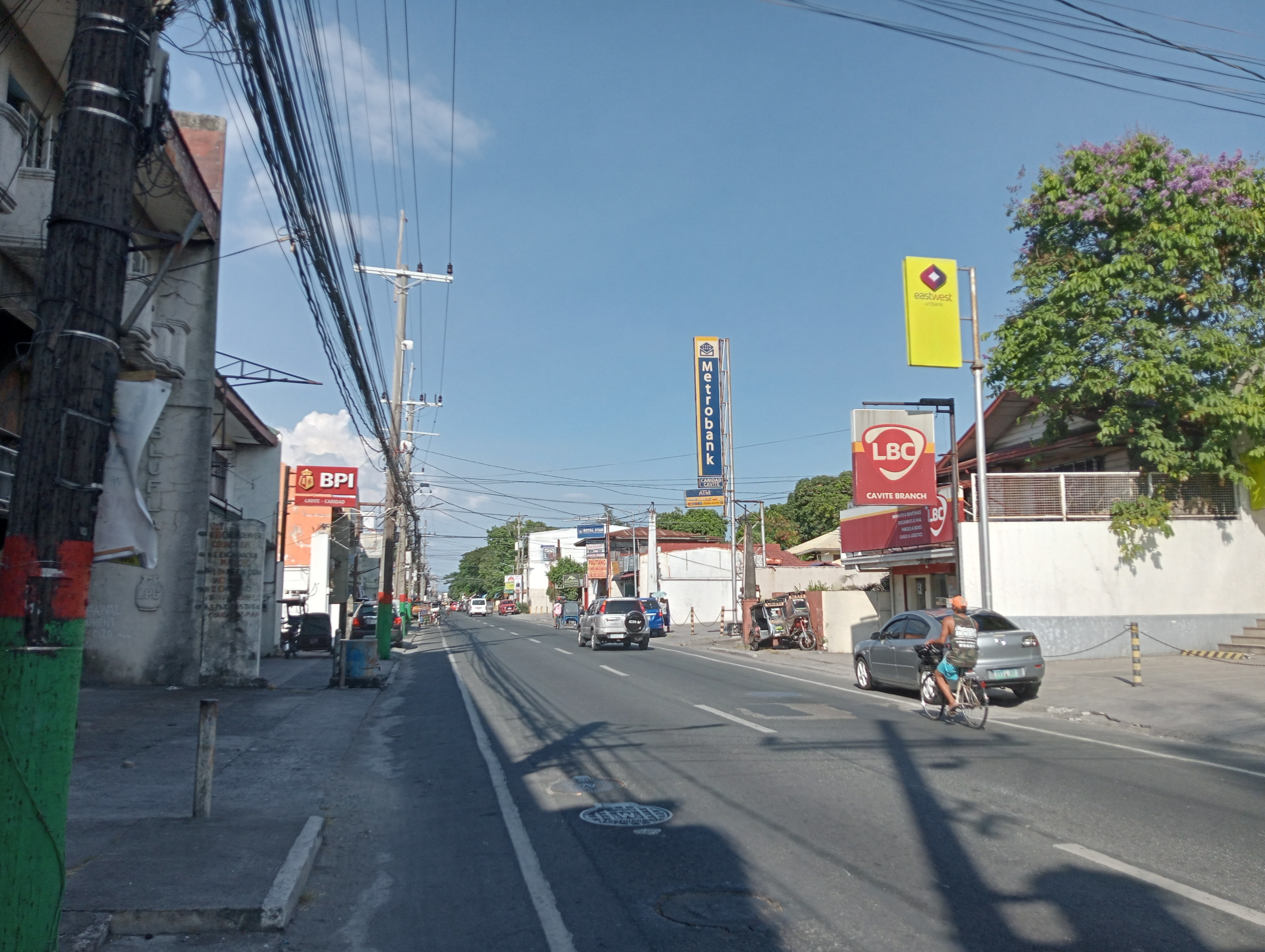
P. Burgos Avenue in Cavite City

N62 resumes as Manila–Cavite Road, going north from the junction with N402 (Marseilla Street) and General Antonio Street in Noveleta. It forms the western stretch of the highway. It then traverses an isthmus as it enters Cavite City. Through Cavite City, the road is called Miranda Street (one-way southbound) and P. Burgos Avenue. At the latter's intersection with Dra. Salamanca Street, it carries one-way eastbound traffic only. It terminates at the Trece Martires Centennial Plaza by Bacoor Bay in Barangay San Roque, where it continues as P. Burgos Extension (N401-1, officially named as Parkway I) towards Naval Base Cavite.

== Landmarks ==
Several landmarks and historical sites are situated along N62, including Aguinaldo Shrine in Kawit, Cavite, where the First Philippine Republic was proclaimed in 1898. SM City Bacoor, the first SM Supermall outside Metro Manila, is located at the intersection of Aguinaldo and Tirona Highways.
