= Cavite–Laguna Expressway =

Expressway in the Philippines

Cavite–Laguna Expressway

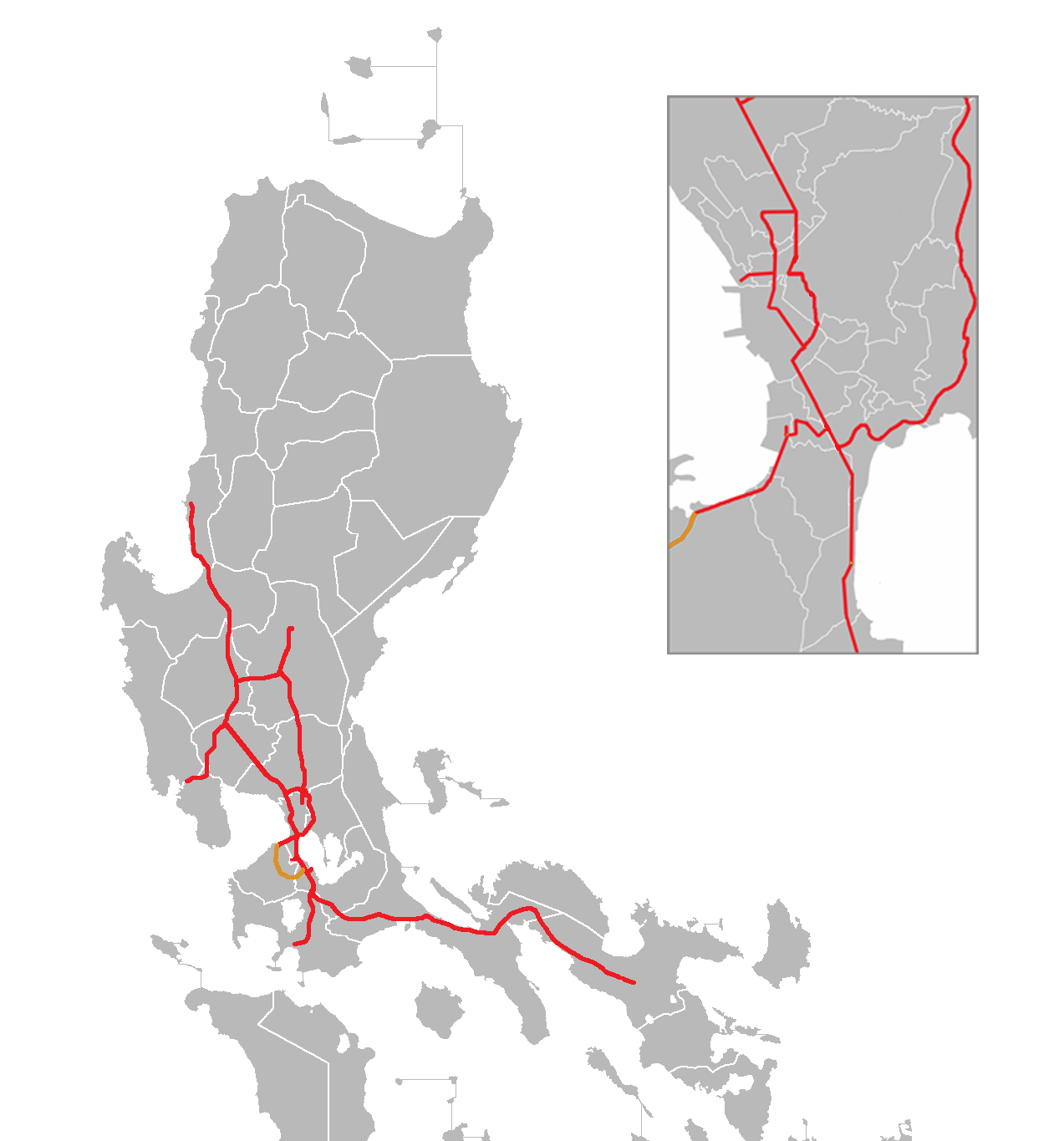
- Map of expressways in Luzon, with Cavite–Laguna Expressway marked in orange

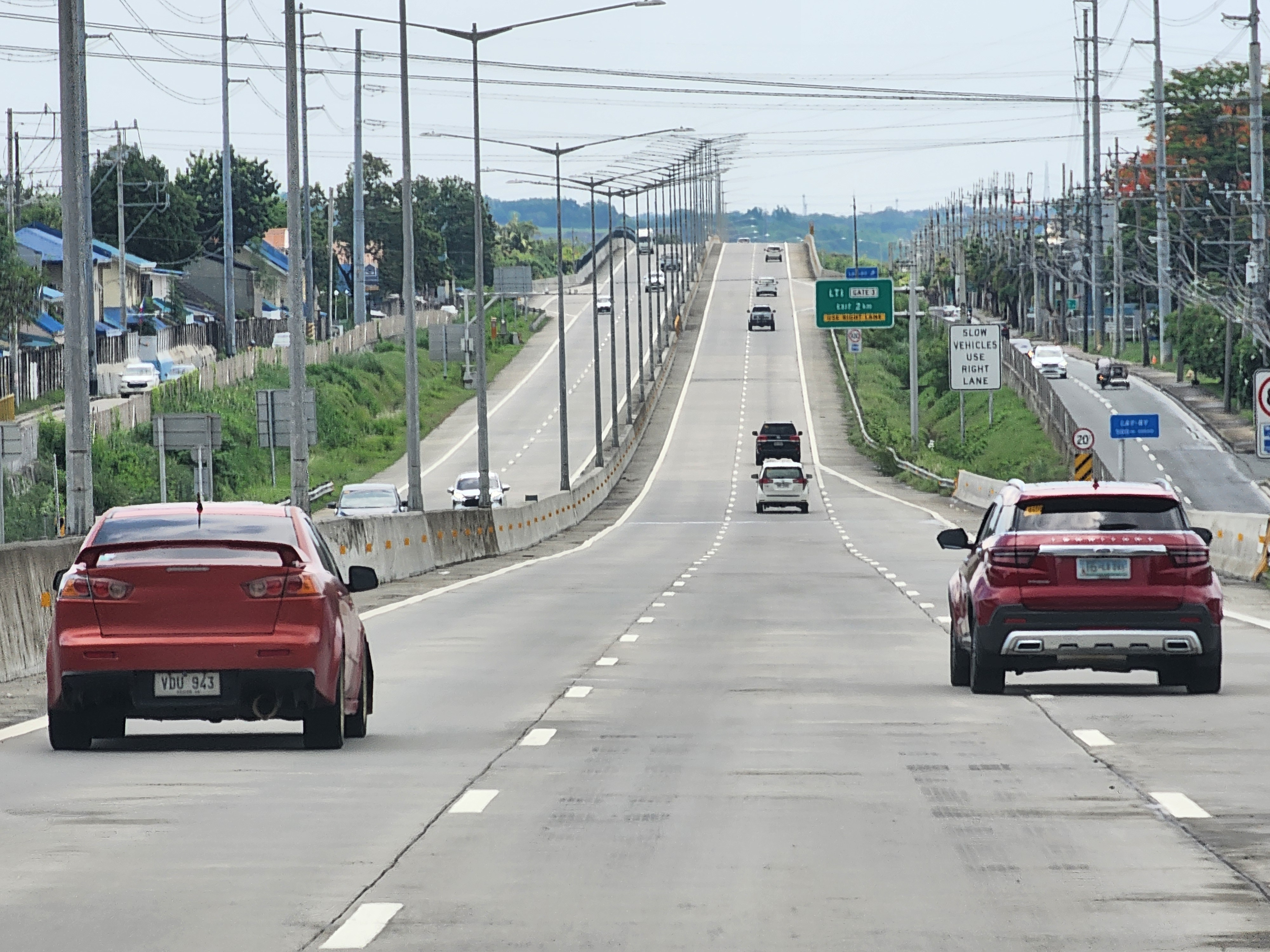
- The expressway northbound in Biñan, June 2024

Route information
- Maintained by MPCALA Holdings Incorporated
- Length: 44.63 km (27.73 mi) (includes the currently operational 26 km (16 mi) segment)
- Status: Partially operational (as of 2026)
- Existed: 2019–present
- Component highways: E3
- Restrictions: Motorcycles below 400cc

Major junctions
- West end: N65 (Governor's Drive) in General Trias
- N410 (Aguinaldo Highway) in Silang; N420 (Santa Rosa–Tagaytay Road) in Santa Rosa, Laguna
- East end: Greenfield Circle in Biñan

Future
- West end: E3 (Manila–Cavite Expressway) in Kawit, Cavite
- Major intersections: N65 (Governor's Drive) in General Trias

Location
- Country: Philippines
- Provinces: Cavite and Laguna
- Major cities: Imus, Dasmariñas, General Trias, Biñan, and Santa Rosa
- Towns: Kawit and Silang

Highway system
- Roads in the Philippines; Highways; Expressways; List

The Cavite–Laguna Expressway (CALAX or CALAEX), signed as E3 of the Philippine expressway network, (Note: CALAX is signed as Expressway 3 (E3) according to an emergency telephone box along the expressway.) is a partially operational controlled-access toll expressway in the provinces of Cavite and Laguna, Philippines. The construction of the 44.63-kilometer-long (27.73 mi) expressway, which began in June 2017, costs an estimated ₱35.43 billion. Once completed, it will connect the Manila–Cavite Expressway in Kawit to the South Luzon Expressway in Biñan and is expected to ease the traffic congestion in the Cavite–Laguna area, particularly along the Aguinaldo Highway, Governor's Drive, and the Santa Rosa–Tagaytay Road.

== Route description ==
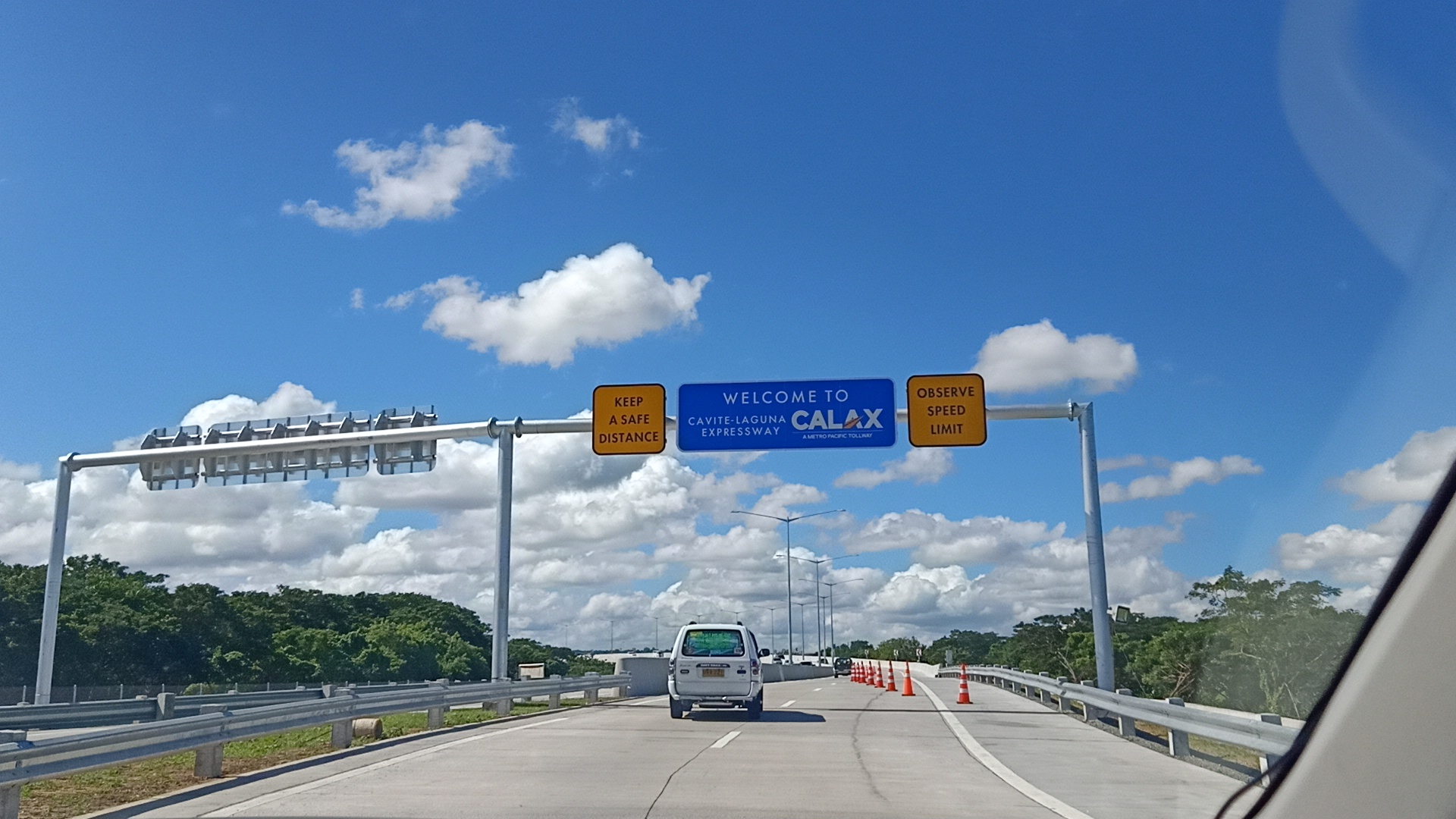
The expressway's eastern terminus at Mamplasan in Biñan, Laguna

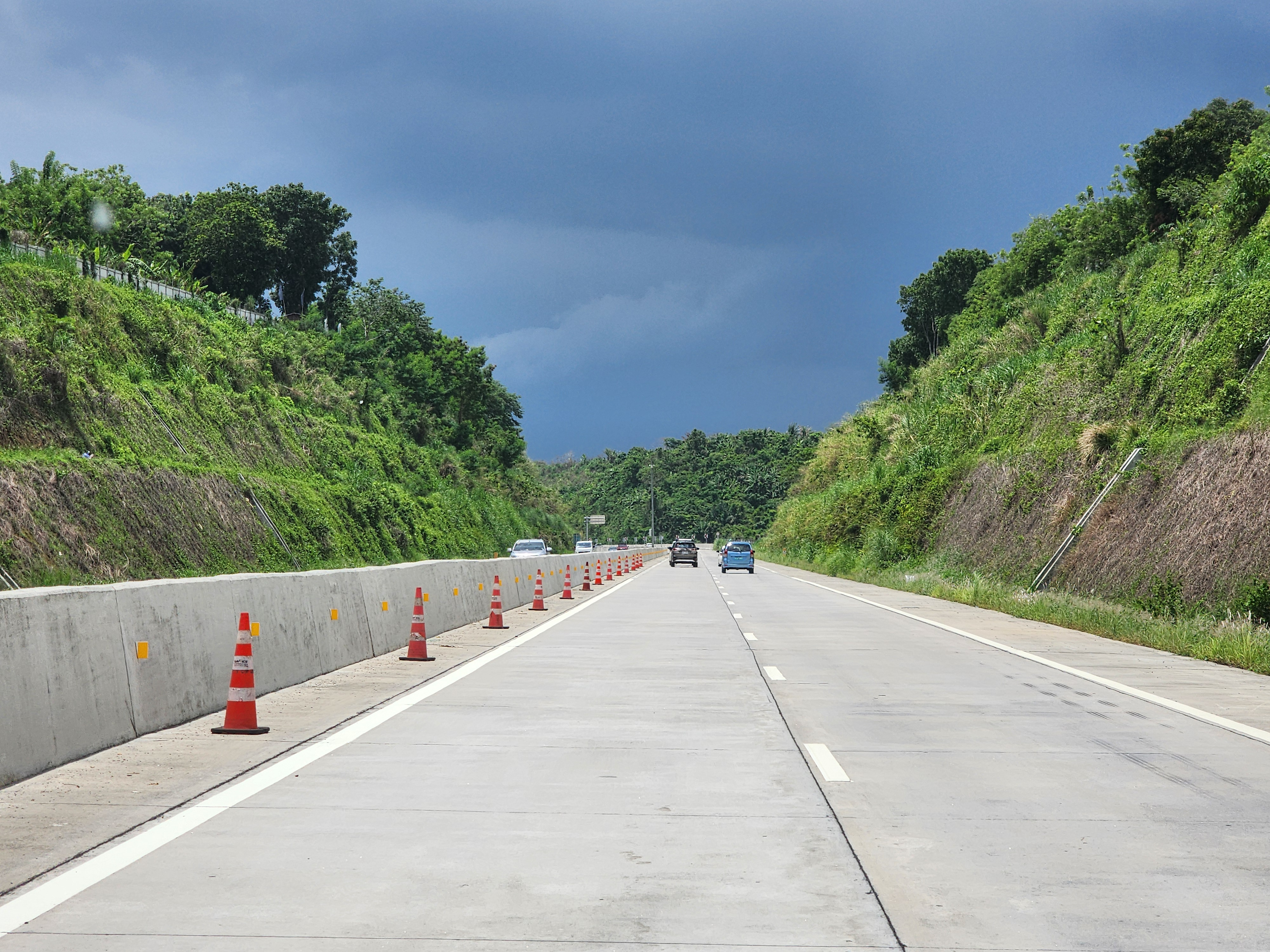
The expressway in Silang, Cavite

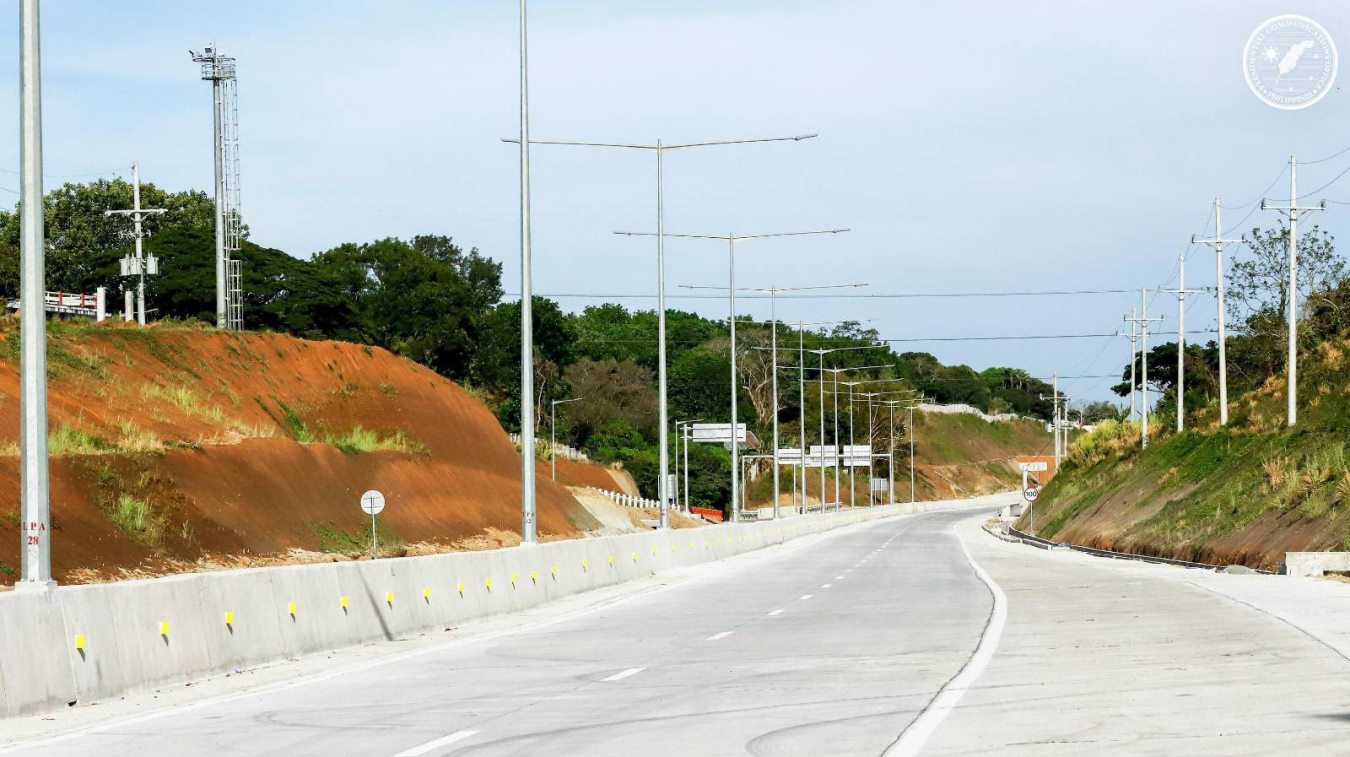
The expressway in General Trias, Cavite

The expressway begins as the Greenfield Circle, a roundabout intersecting with South Luzon Expressway's Greenfield City-Unilab (Mamplasan) Exit, Mamplasan Access Road, LIIP Avenue, and Greenfield Parkway in Biñan, Laguna. It continues west, then makes a reverse curve to the southwest through the future Greenfield City Biñan development. It enters the Laguna Boulevard right of way near the boulevard's intersection with Greenfield Parkway. It approaches the first toll plaza near the Verdana Homes gated community and continues southwest, passing through a mix of developed and undeveloped areas at barangays Loma, Timbao and Malamig, then turning south into barangay Biñan, where it passes near Laguna Technopark, De La Salle University – Laguna Campus, Broadfield, and several gated communities; access for them is provided by service roads. The expressway partially runs above grade, utilizing underpass bridges, mechanically stabilized earth (MSE) walls, and a viaduct at this section to pass above major intersections and accesses.

Entering Santa Rosa, CALAX descends into grade level to cross the Silang–Santa Rosa River and clear a power line, then gently curves to the southwest to follow the Nuvali Boulevard right of way, where the expressway ascends above grade again to pass over South Boulevard, served by the Laguna Boulevard Exit. Past the exit, it leaves the Nuvali Boulevard right of way and crosses the Silang–Santa Rosa River again, this time the Cavite–Laguna provincial boundary into Silang. It makes another reverse curve through cornfields to the Santa Rosa–Tagaytay Exit, a trumpet interchange which leads to Santa Rosa–Tagaytay Road.

The expressway continues southwest and makes a few turns before traversing a bridge and entering a cut section, passing near South Forbes Golf City and Ayala Westgrove Heights. It turns northwest and passes under Tibig Road, passing by Silang East Exit, a diamond interchange which leads to Tibig-Kaong Road. Then, it runs for 4 kilometers (2.5 mi) until it reaches Silang (Aguinaldo) interchange, which provides access to Aguinaldo Highway. After that, it turns straight toward the west, shortly entering into Dasmariñas, and curving north into General Trias which is its current terminus at the Governor’s Drive Interchange. Its section from there to Kawit is currently under construction. Once finished, it will traverse north further into General Trias and shift eastward into Imus before ending in Kawit, and will be linked to the Manila–Cavite Expressway (CAVITEX) via the elevated CAVITEX–CALAX Link.

== History ==
=== Planning and development ===
First CALAX logo, still used alternatively

CALAEX logo variant, also used alternatively

In 1994, a partnership between John Laing International and the Philippine National Construction Corporation (PNCC) proposed the Tagaytay Expressway. This plan detailed a 20-kilometer (12 mi), four-lane highway connecting the South Luzon Expressway to Tagaytay by way of either Calamba or Santa Rosa.

The proposed Segment 5 of the Manila–Cavite Toll Expressway Project (MCTEP) under the 11.3-kilometer (7.0 mi) R-1 Expressway Extension, when Cavite was going to transform into a highly industrialized province, which was conceptualized by Trade and Industry Assistant Secretary and future Senator, Vice President and President Gloria Macapagal Arroyo in 1988 when she proposed the implementation of the Cavite Trade and Industry Plan. The segment would have been a 4.3-kilometer (2.7 mi) extension from Kawit, connecting to the existing Segment 4 to Noveleta. However, the 1-kilometer (0.62 mi) portion was absorbed into the planned link between CAVITEX and CALAX. The proposal for a link between CAVITEX and SLEX was conceptualized as the southern section of Circumferential Road 6, an 18-kilometer (11 mi) connection suggested by the joint venture of Public Estates Authority (now Philippine Reclamation Authority) and Renong Berhad of Malaysia. These projects never came into fruition.

In 2006, the Japan International Cooperation Agency (JICA) conducted a study on the CALA East-West National Road. JICA later conducted another study, this time on the master plan of the High Standard Highway Network (HSH) in 2010, which included the expressway project. In 2012, JICA also conducted a study for the expressway that proposed building the Laguna section.

The original plan was that the project had to be financed through two funding schemes: the official development assistance (ODA) would have funded the portion of the Laguna section, while the public-private partnership (PPP) would handle the construction of the Cavite section. The project was revised as a PPP scheme, approved by President Benigno Aquino III on January 18, 2013.

=== Construction and groundbreaking ===
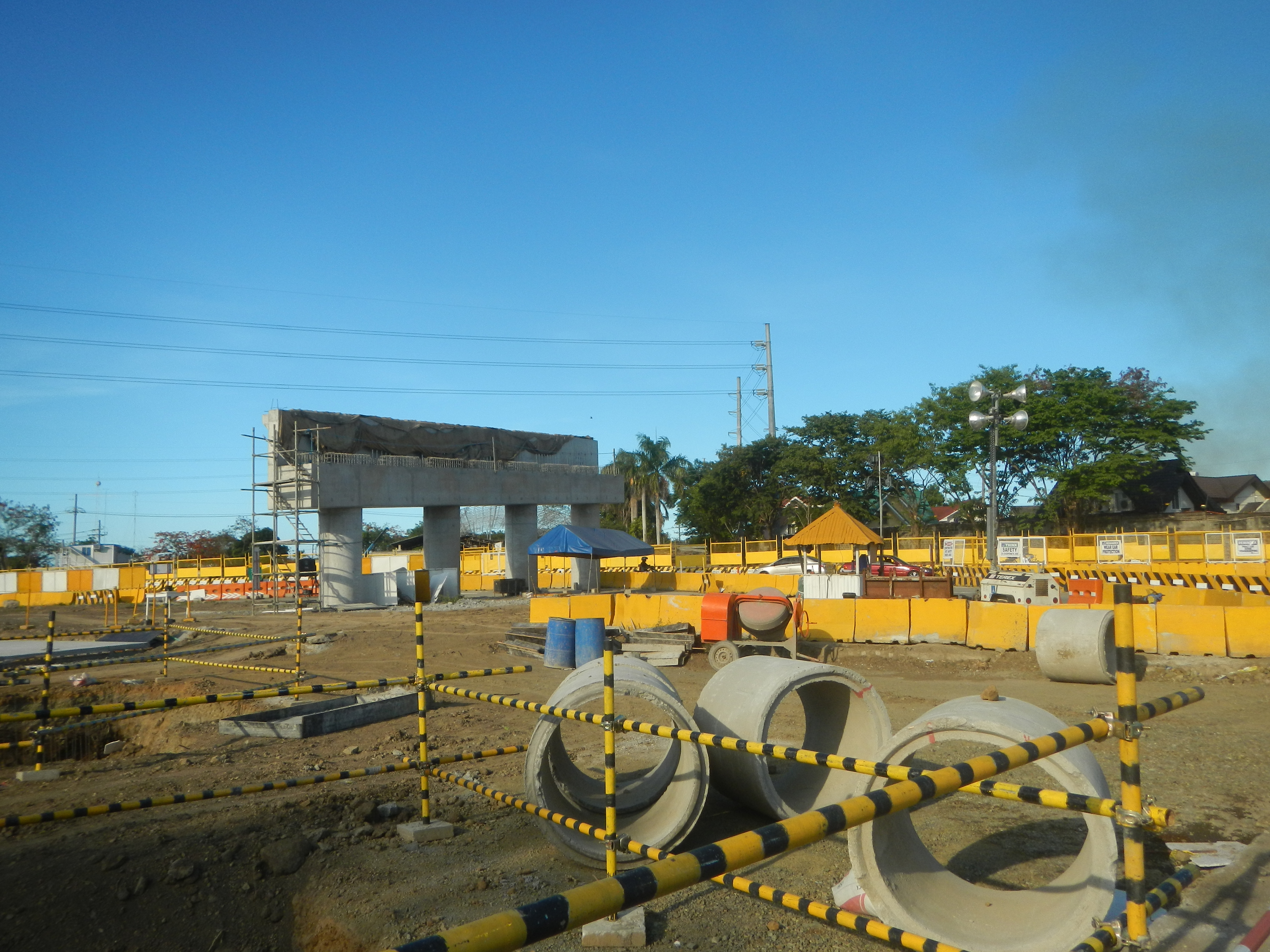
Construction of CALAX along Nuvali Boulevard in Santa Rosa (May 2018)

In November 2013, four pre-qualified bidders were vying for CALAX: Alloy MTD Philippines Inc.; Team Orion, the consortium of AC Infrastructure Holdings Inc., AboitizLand, Inc., and Macquarie Infrastructure Holdings Philippines; MPCALA Holdings Inc.; and Optimal Infrastructure Development Inc. of San Miguel Corporation.

On June 12, 2014, Team Orion, the joint venture of Ayala Corporation and Aboitiz Equity Ventures, won the bid, placing a concession payment of ₱11.659 billion for the project. Optimal Infrastructure was disqualified because its bid security fell short of the 180 days required by the government. Its bid envelope specified a financial bid of ₱20.105 billion. The bidding became controversial, and in October of that year, Ayala and Aboitiz expressed disappointment over the government when they bidded again.

The Office of the President decided to rebid the project until then and re-approve it on February 17, 2015. MPCALA Holdings, the consortium led by Metro Pacific Investments Corporation and its subsidiary, Metro Pacific Tollways Corporation (MPTC), won by submitting a concession premium of ₱27.3 billion to be paid to the government. This is higher than San Miguel's bid of ₱22.2 billion.

The project's groundbreaking occurred on June 19, 2017, and right-of-way acquisition continues as of October 2017. According to a statement by MPCALA Holdings President Luigi Bautista, construction of the Cavite portion of the expressway was expected to begin in April 2018. The groundbreaking ceremony for the Cavite segment was eventually held on March 27, 2019. Meanwhile, the Department of Public Works and Highways, then headed by Secretary Mark Villar, expected the Laguna segment to be opened by October 2019. The Laguna segment became fully operational, while the Cavite segment is still undergoing construction. Both segments were expected to be fully operational and completed by 2022 but were delayed to 2023 due to the COVID-19 pandemic and again to 2025 due to construction delays. However, due to the arrival of new contractors, the expressway is expected to be completed in 2026.

=== Partial opening and gradual extensions ===
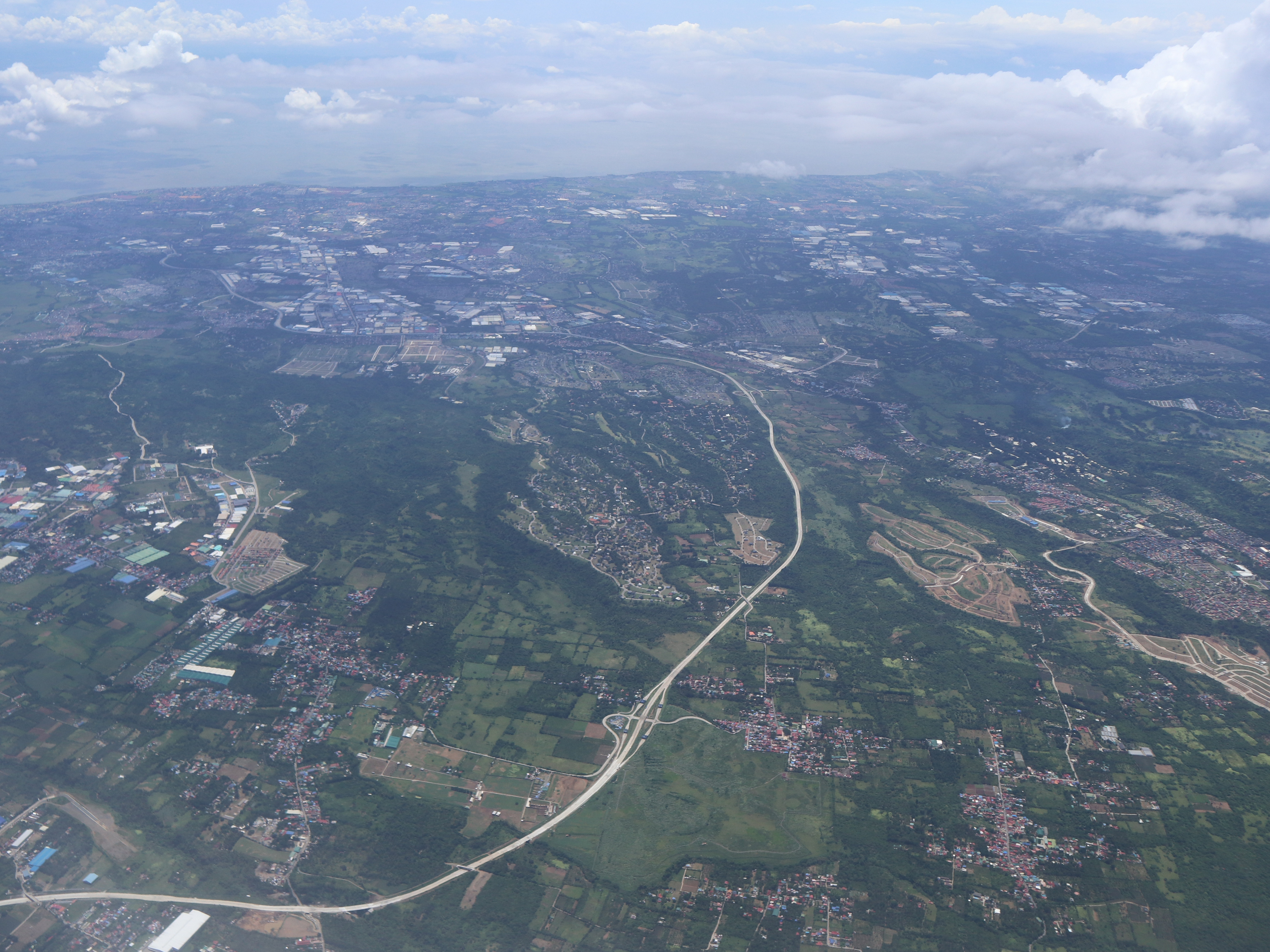
Aerial view of CALAX in Silang, Cavite

The first section of the expressway between Mamplasan Interchange in Biñan and Santa Rosa–Tagaytay Road was made accessible on October 30, 2019, in time for All Saints' Day and All Souls' Day. However, its length is conflicting, with Metro Pacific Tollways Corporation stating it as 8.9 kilometers (5.5 mi) while news outlets report it as 10 kilometers (6.2 mi). The entry and exit points at each end were opened to serve an estimated 10,000 cars. However, the segment was supposed to be operational back in December 2018 or by February 2019.

The expressway was closed from January 28 to 31 and February 4 to 7, 2020, from 1:00 AM to 4:00 AM (PST) to give way for construction and clearing operations due to ashfalls brought on by the 2020 Taal Volcano eruption.

On August 18, 2020, the Laguna Technopark and Laguna Boulevard Exits in Biñan and Santa Rosa, respectively, were opened to the public.

On August 24, 2021, the 6-kilometer (3.7 mi) section leading to the Silang East interchange in Silang, Cavite was opened to the public two months behind its initial June 2021 opening. Meanwhile, the section leading to the Silang (Aguinaldo) interchange opened to motorists on November 8, 2023, two months behind its initial September opening. On May 4, 2026, the expressway's Subsection 3 leading to the Governor's Drive Interchange in General Trias was opened.

In November of the same year, the government announced that the last two sections of the expressway between Governor's Drive Interchange and western terminus connecting with a link to CAVITEX through CCLink viaduct will be opened by the first week of December.

== Toll ==
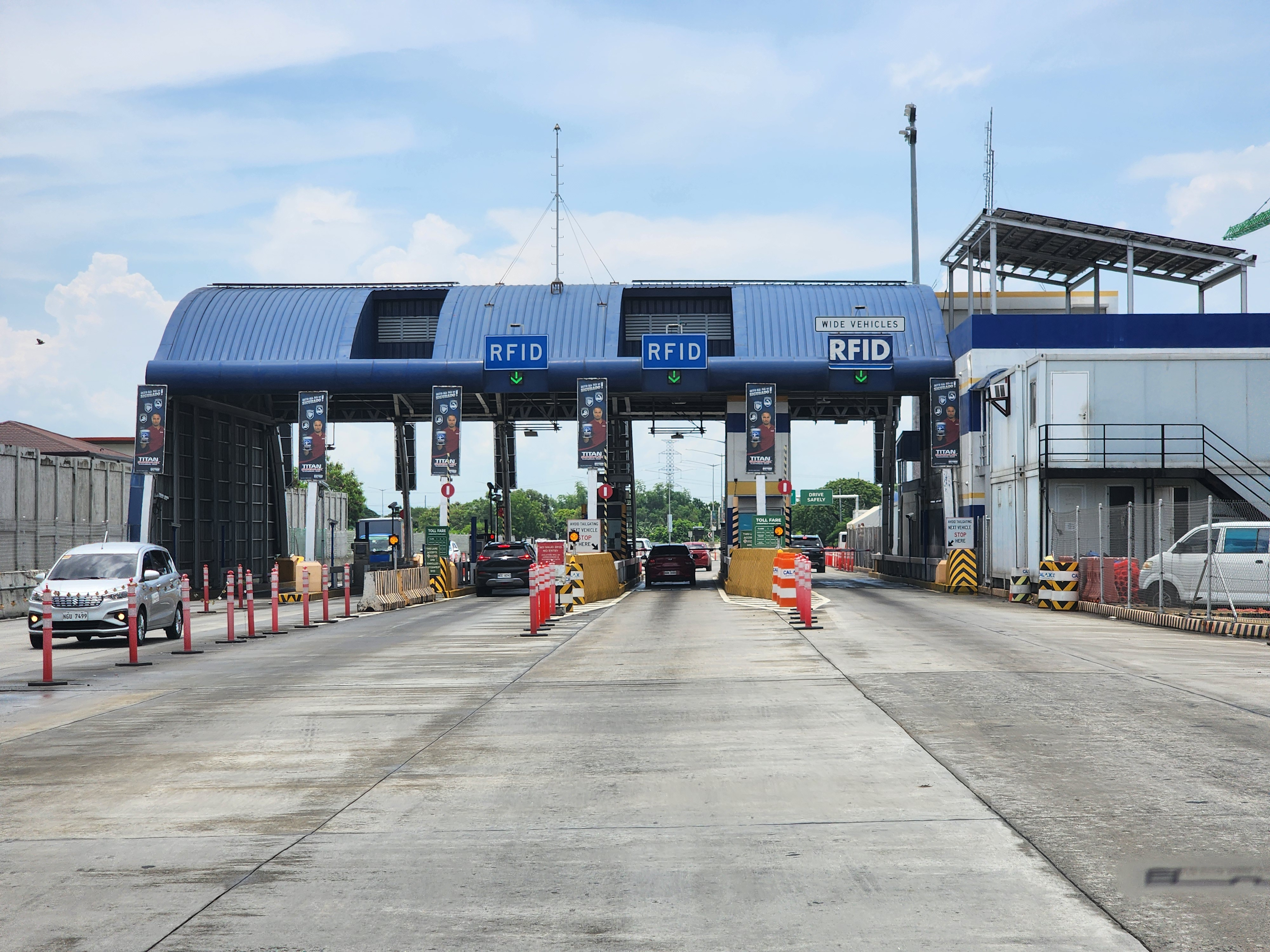
Greenfield Toll Plaza

Cavite–Laguna Expressway is a closed road system in which motorists pay a toll based on their vehicle class and distance travelled. Toll collection is done upon exit. Easytrip Services Corporation operates the electronic toll collection (ETC) system on the expressway, and collections are done on mixed lanes at the toll barriers. Under the law, all toll rates include a 12% value-added tax.

In 2023, the tollway system between Greenfield and Santa Rosa–Tagaytay toll plazas initiated a two-month dry-run of contactless tolling operations.

Toll rates as of August 9, 2026:

Class	Toll
Class 1 (Cars, Motorcycles, SUVs, Jeepneys)	₱4.50/km
Class 2 (Buses, Light Trucks)	₱9.00/km
Class 3 (Heavy Trucks)	₱13.50/km

== Services ==
=== Service station ===
As of August 2025, the Cavite–Laguna Expressway will have one service area: a Caltex station on the westbound lane in Biñan. The station is set to open in 2026.

=== Emergency phones and parking bays ===
Emergency Roadside Communication System (ERSC) telephone boxes are located throughout the whole length of the expressway. Parking bays (lay-bys) are also placed on the shoulder of the expressway, for use in emergency situations.

== Exits ==
This entire route is located in Calabarzon. Exits will be numbered by kilometer posts, with Rizal Park in Manila designated as kilometer zero.

Province	City/Municipality	km	mi	Exit	Name	Destinations	Notes
Cavite	Kawit			Western terminus (Kawit Viaduct Extension) after Centennial Road interchange and connecting with CAVITEX–CALAX Link, which serves as a boundary between expressways before Kawit toll plaza; continues north to Manila as E3 (Manila–Cavite Expressway)			
Cavite	Kawit				Centennial Road (Cavite City)	N64 (Antero Soriano Highway) / N62 (Tirona Highway) / Daang Hari Link – Bacoor, Kawit, Evo City, Cavite City	Trumpet interchange
Cavite	Imus				Open Canal Road (Imus)	Open Canal Road – Imus, General Trias, Lancaster New City	Trumpet interchange
Cavite	Imus			Waterway Bridge 1 over the Ylang-Ylang River			
Cavite	General Trias				Riverpark		Trumpet interchange
Cavite	General Trias			Maralas Waterway Bridge			
Cavite	General Trias				Governor's Drive	N65 (Governor's Drive) – General Trias, Trece Martires, Dasmariñas	Trumpet interchange; current western terminus
Cavite	Dasmariñas			No major junctions			
Cavite	Silang				Silang (Aguinaldo) (Note: According to the signage, the exit is named Aguinaldo Highway. However, according to MPCALA, Silang (Aguinaldo) is the name where it is seen on social media or matrices.)	N410 (Aguinaldo Highway) – Silang, Dasmariñas, Tagaytay, Nasugbu	Half diamond and half trumpet interchange, former western terminus (2023–2026)
Cavite	Silang				Cavite–Batangas Expressway	CBEX – Nasugbu	
Cavite	Silang	51	32		Silang East (Note: According to the signage, the exit is named Silang. However, according to MPCALA, Silang East is the name where it is seen on social media or matrices.)	Tibig–Kaong Road – Silang, General Mariano Alvarez	Diamond interchange; former western terminus (2021-2023)
Cavite	Silang			Tibig–Munting Ilog Waterway Bridge (Extension; eastbound) / Tibig–Munting Ilog Waterway Bridge			
Cavite	Silang			Carmen Waterway Bridge 1			
Cavite	Silang	57	35		Santa Rosa–Tagaytay (Santa Rosa City)	N420 (Santa Rosa–Tagaytay Road) – Santa Rosa	Trumpet interchange; former western terminus (2019–2021); access to SM Nuvali
Laguna	Santa Rosa				Laguna Boulevard	Nuvali Boulevard, South Boulevard – Laguna Technopark Gates 1 & 2, Nuvali, Inchican	Diamond interchange
Laguna	Biñan				Laguna Technopark	Nuvali Road – Laguna Technopark Gate 3, Timbao	Eastbound exit and westbound entrance
Laguna	Biñan			Ayala Laguna Boulevard Viaduct 2			
Laguna	Biñan			Caltex service station (westbound)			
Laguna	Biñan			Greenfield Toll Plaza			
Laguna	Biñan					Greenfield Parkway	Eastbound exit only
Laguna	Biñan				Mamplasan	AH26 (SLEX) / Greenfield Parkway / LIIP Avenue – Manila, Biñan, LIIP, Calamba	Greenfield Circle (roundabout); eastern terminus
1.000 mi = 1.609 km; 1.000 km = 0.621 mi: Incomplete access; Tolled; Unopened
