= Wawa Bridge =

Bridge in Bacoor and Las Piñas, Philippines

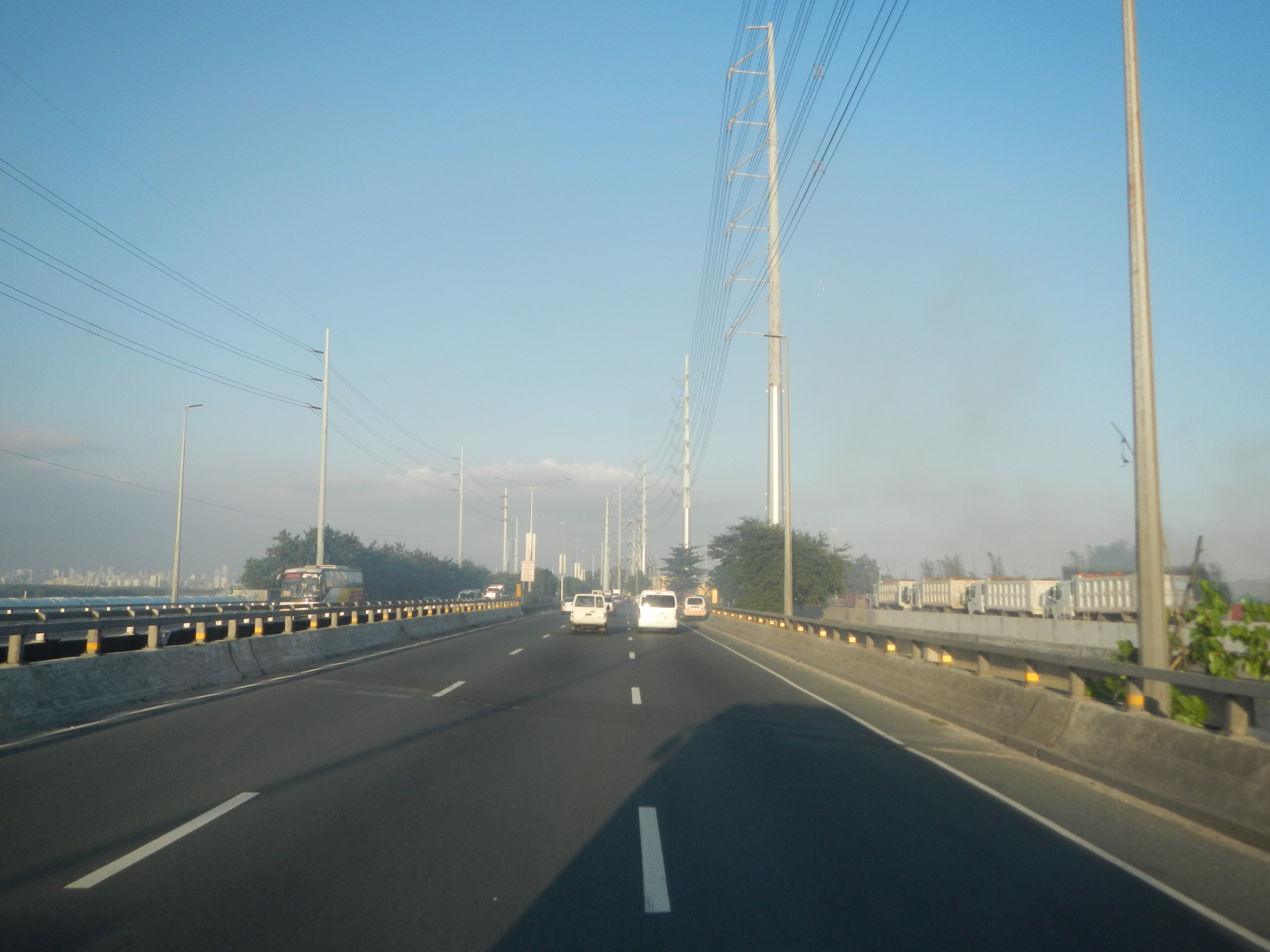
- Wawa Bridge looking northbound, 2018
- Coordinates: 14°28′31.45″N 120°58′12.65″E
- Carries: Carries northbound and southbound vehicles over the Zapote River for the CAVITEX expressway
- Crosses: Zapote River
- Locale: Boundary of Las Piñas, Metro Manila and Bacoor, Cavite, Philippines
- Maintained by: Cavitex Infrastructure Corporation (CIC); Philippine Reclamation Authority (PRA); PEATC

Characteristics
- Design: Beam bridge

Location
- Interactive map of Wawa Bridge

Wawa Bridge is a highway bridge located at the boundary of Bacoor, Cavite and Las Piñas, Metro Manila, Philippines. It carries the mainline carriageway of the Manila–Cavite Expressway (CAVITEX, designated as E3) across the mouth of the Zapote River as it empties into Bacoor Bay.

== History and expansion ==
As part of the Segment 1 (R-1) section of CAVITEX—a 6.48-kilometer (4.03 mi) expressway stretching from Seaside Drive in Parañaque to Zapote in Las Piñas, Wawa Bridge serves as one of the three major mainline bridges along the tollway, alongside Parañaque Bridge and Las Piñas Bridge.

Between 2018 and 2020, the bridge underwent a major expansion project under Phase 2 of the ₱1.1-billion R-1 enhancement project aimed at increasing road capacity and alleviating congestion along the expressway corridor. The project involved the physical widening of Wawa Bridge, Parañaque Bridge, and Las Piñas Bridge.

In June 2018, Department of Public Works and Highways (DPWH) Secretary Mark Villar announced that the ₱300-million second phase (covering bridge widening at the Wawa area) had started late in 2017 and was targeted for completion by late July or early August 2018.

In August 2018, media reports stated that the ₱300-million widening project for the bridges in Wawa, Las Piñas, and Parañaque was scheduled to begin by September 2018, with targeted completion by April or May 2019.

The formal execution of Phase 2 road enhancements eventually began in June 2019, with construction work resuming in May 2020 following temporary suspensions due to COVID-19 community quarantines.

== See also ==
- List of bridges in the Philippines
- Manila–Cavite Expressway
