= Zapote Bridge =

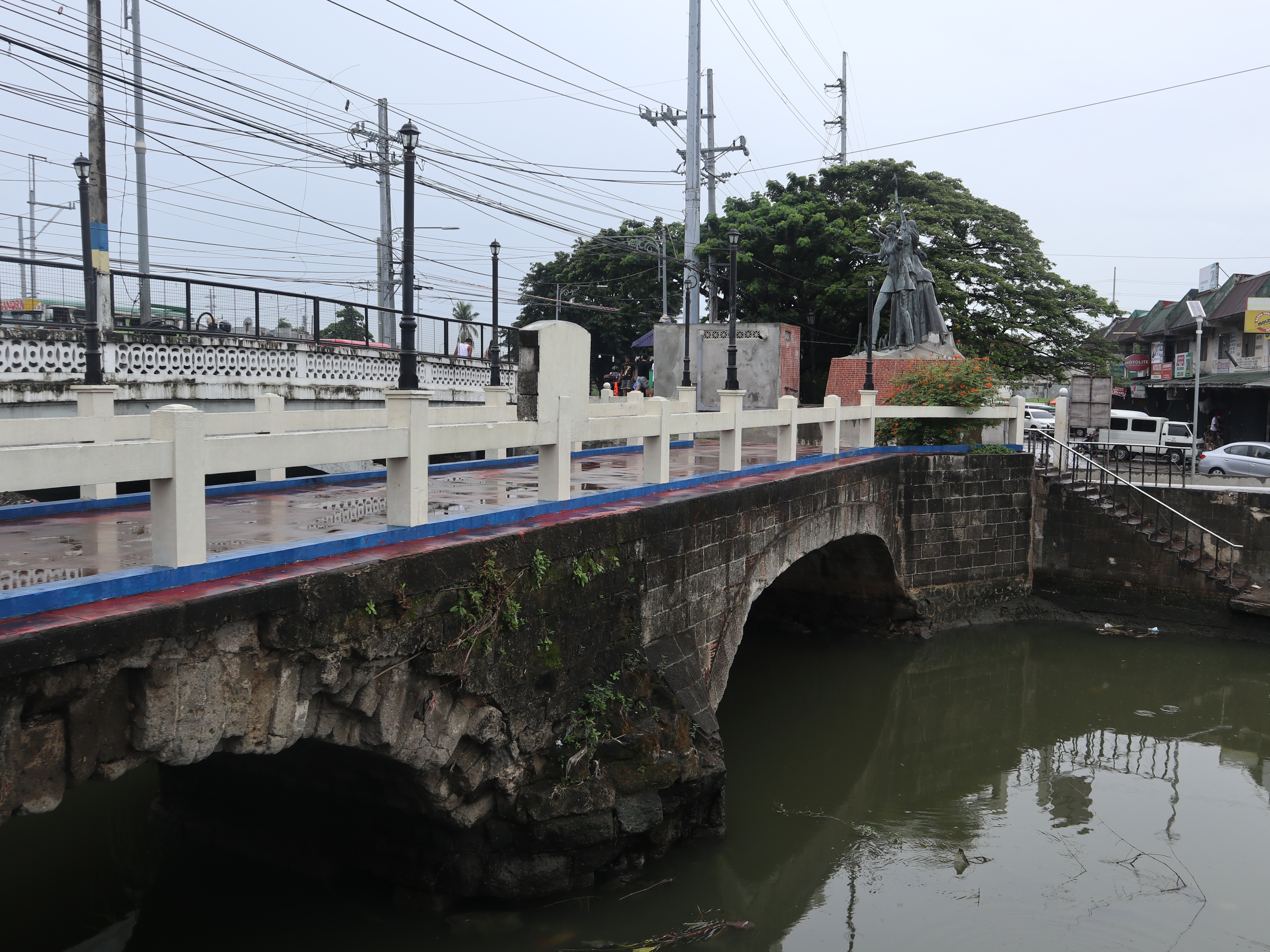
- Coordinates: 14°27′50.36″N 120°57′59.00″E
- Carries: Pedestrians
- Crosses: Zapote River and Zapote River Drive
- Locale: Las Piñas, Metro Manila and Bacoor, Cavite
- Maintained by: Department of Public Works and Highways

Characteristics
- Design: stone arch bridge

Location
- Interactive map of Zapote Bridge

The Zapote Bridge is a stone arch pedestrian bridge crossing the Zapote River in the Philippines. It connects the cities of Las Piñas in Metro Manila and Bacoor in the province of Cavite. The bridge and its surrounding area was the site of two battles, the Battle of Zapote Bridge (1897) between Filipino revolutionaries and the Spanish colonial government in 1897 during the Philippine Revolution, and the Battle of Zapote River between Filipino and American forces in 1899 during the Philippine–American War. Because of these historic events, the bridge was designated as a National Historical Landmark by the National Historical Commission of the Philippines on September 9, 2013.

A modern concrete bridge, also named Zapote Bridge, carrying motorized vehicles and part of Aguinaldo Highway was constructed parallel to the original bridge.

== Gallery ==
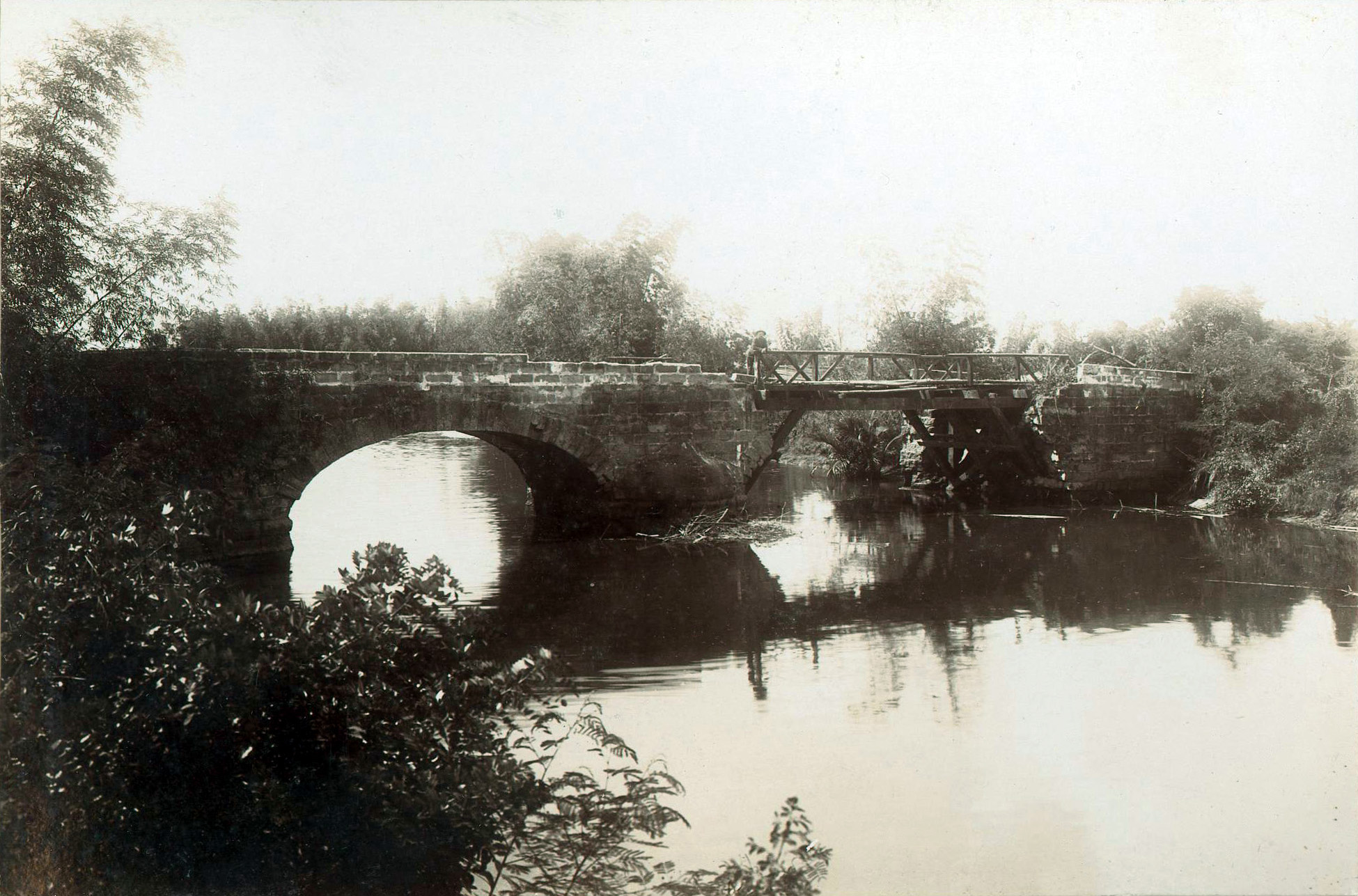
The repaired bridge in 1899 after the Battle of Zapote River

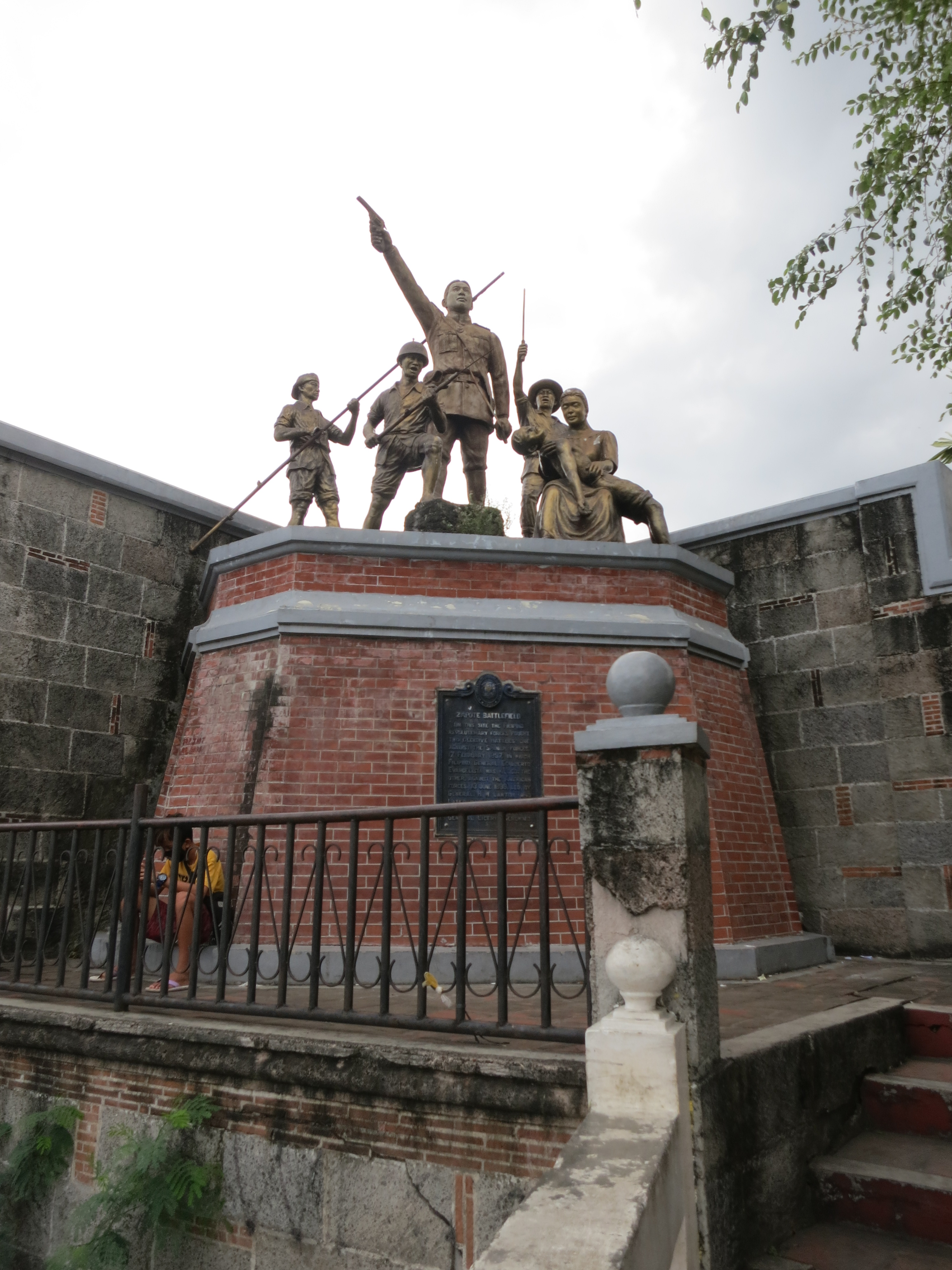
Monument commemorating the two battles located at the southern end of the bridge

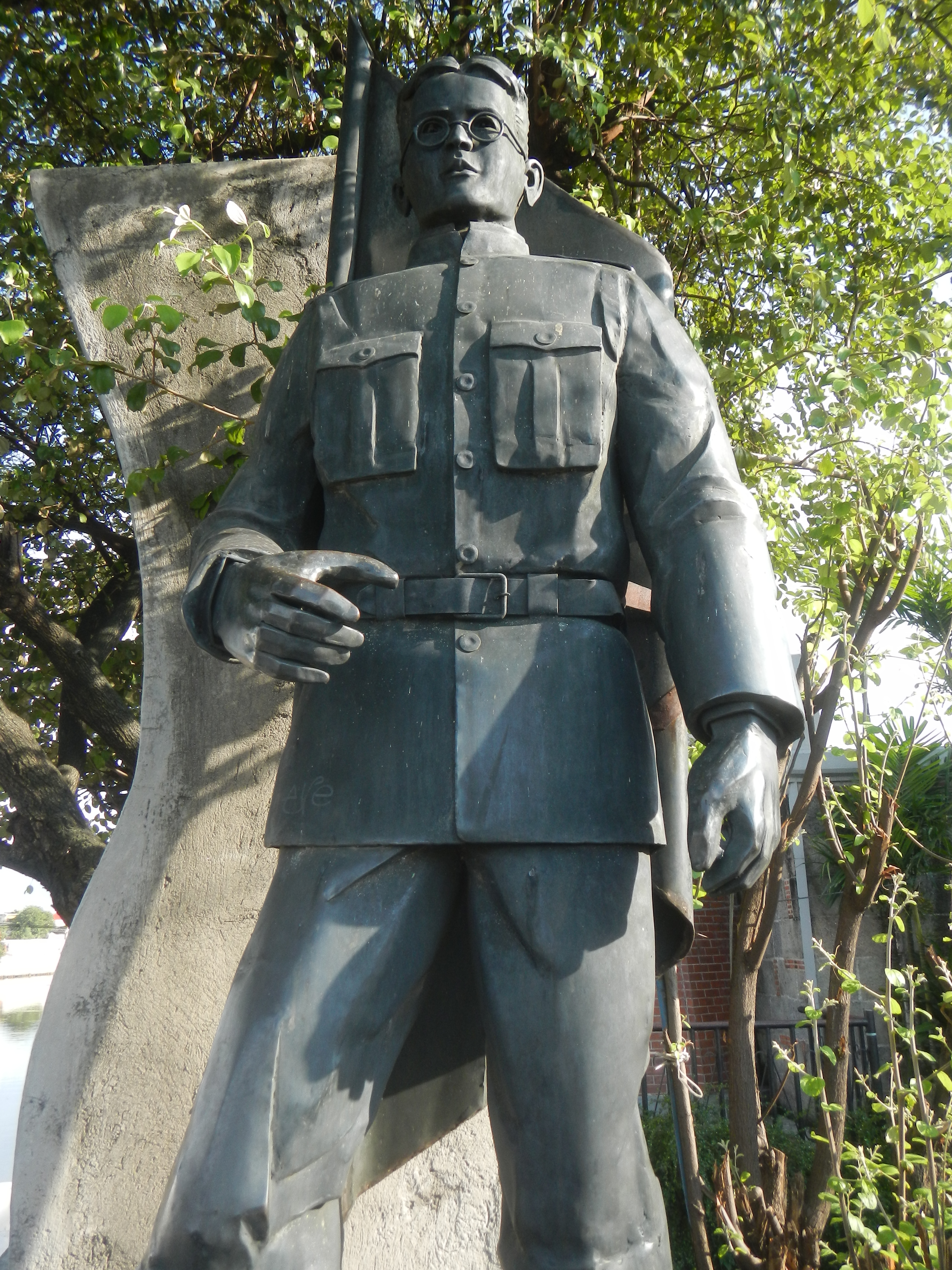
Statue of Filipino general Edilberto Evangelista who fought the Spanish forces in the Battle of Zapote Bridge located on the southern end of the bridge

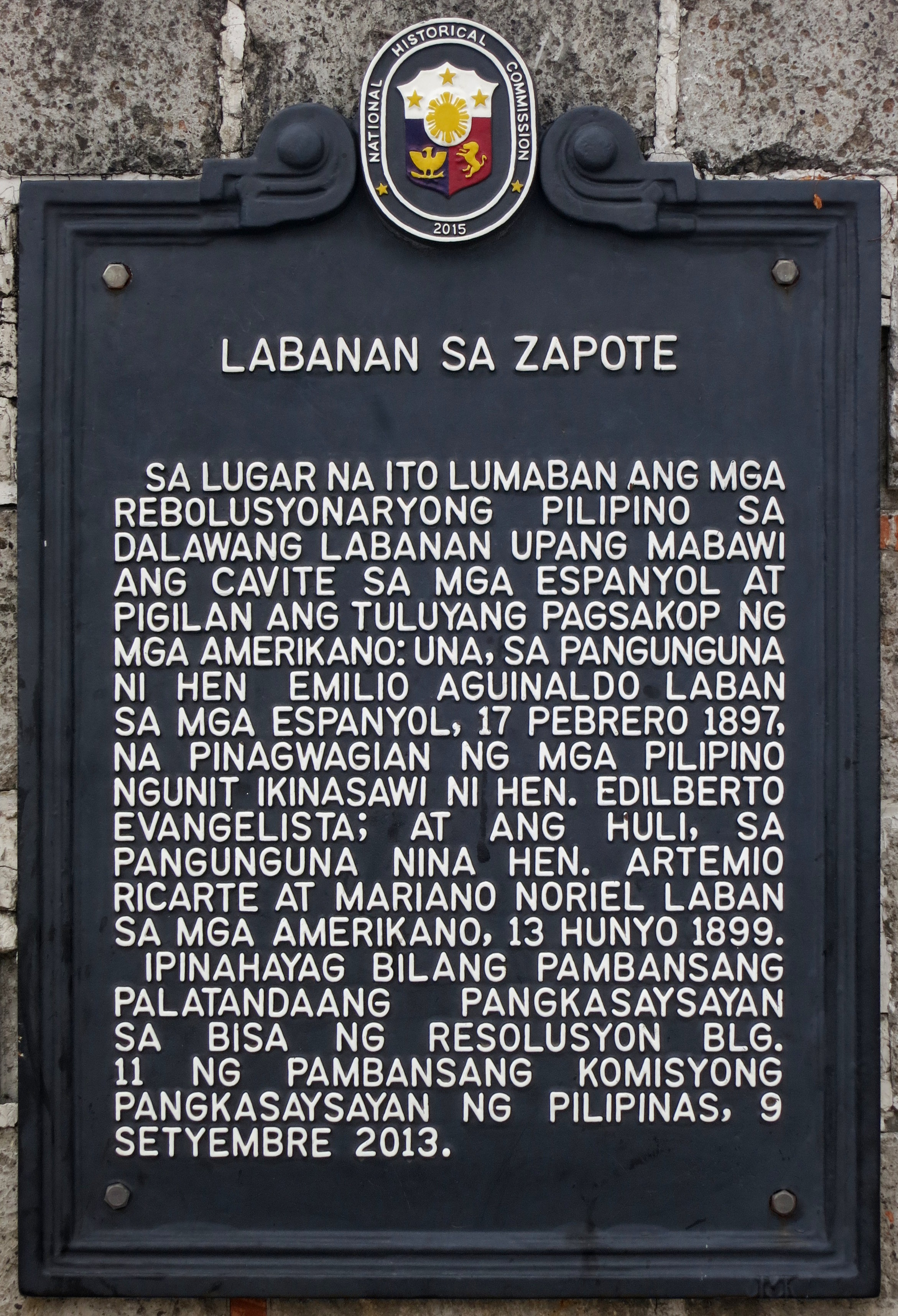
Historical marker installed by the National Historical Commission of the Philippines in 2015 to commemorate the two battles

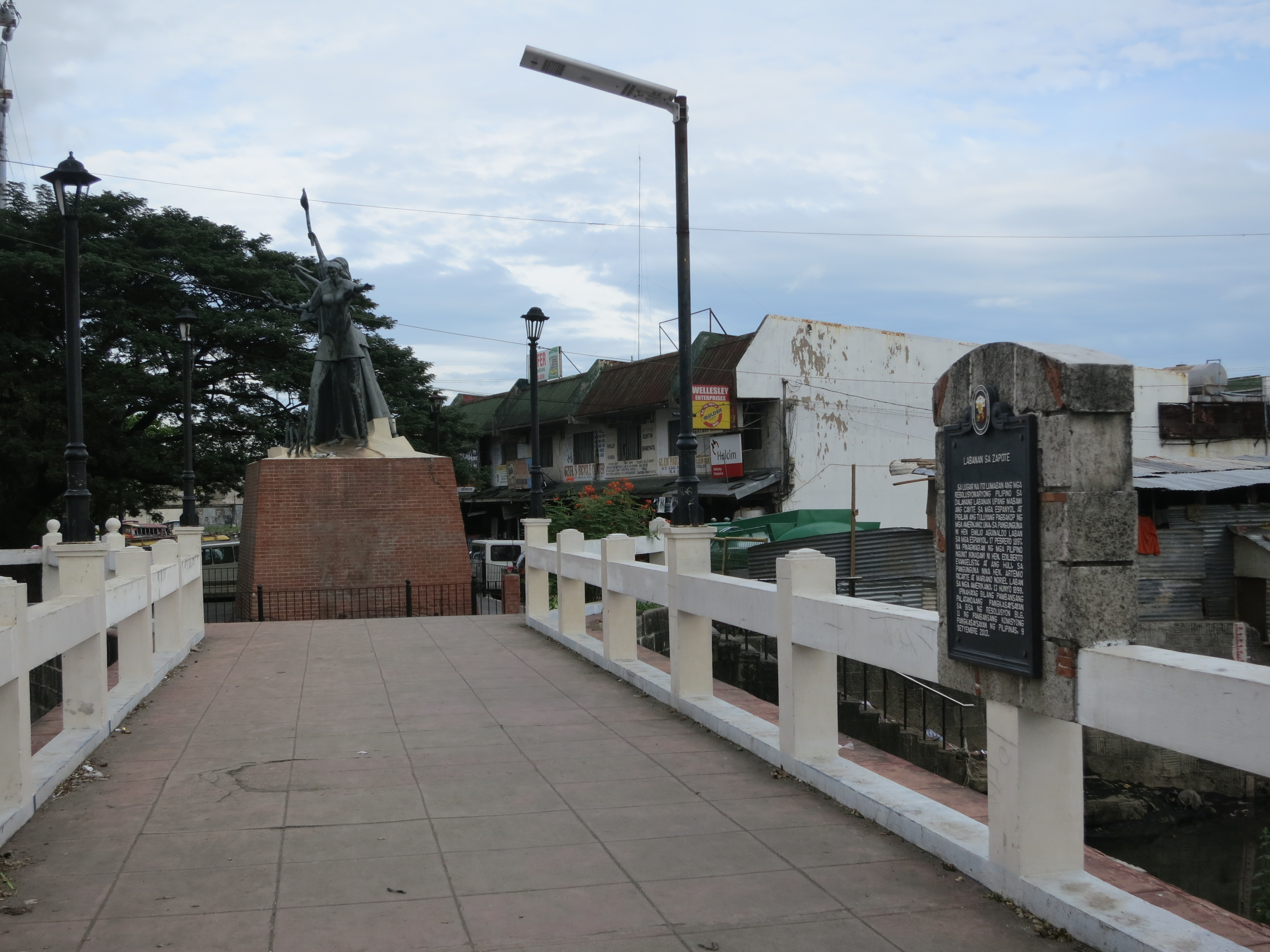
Zapote Bridge looking northward
