= Las Piñas Bridge =

Bridge in Las Piñas, Philippines

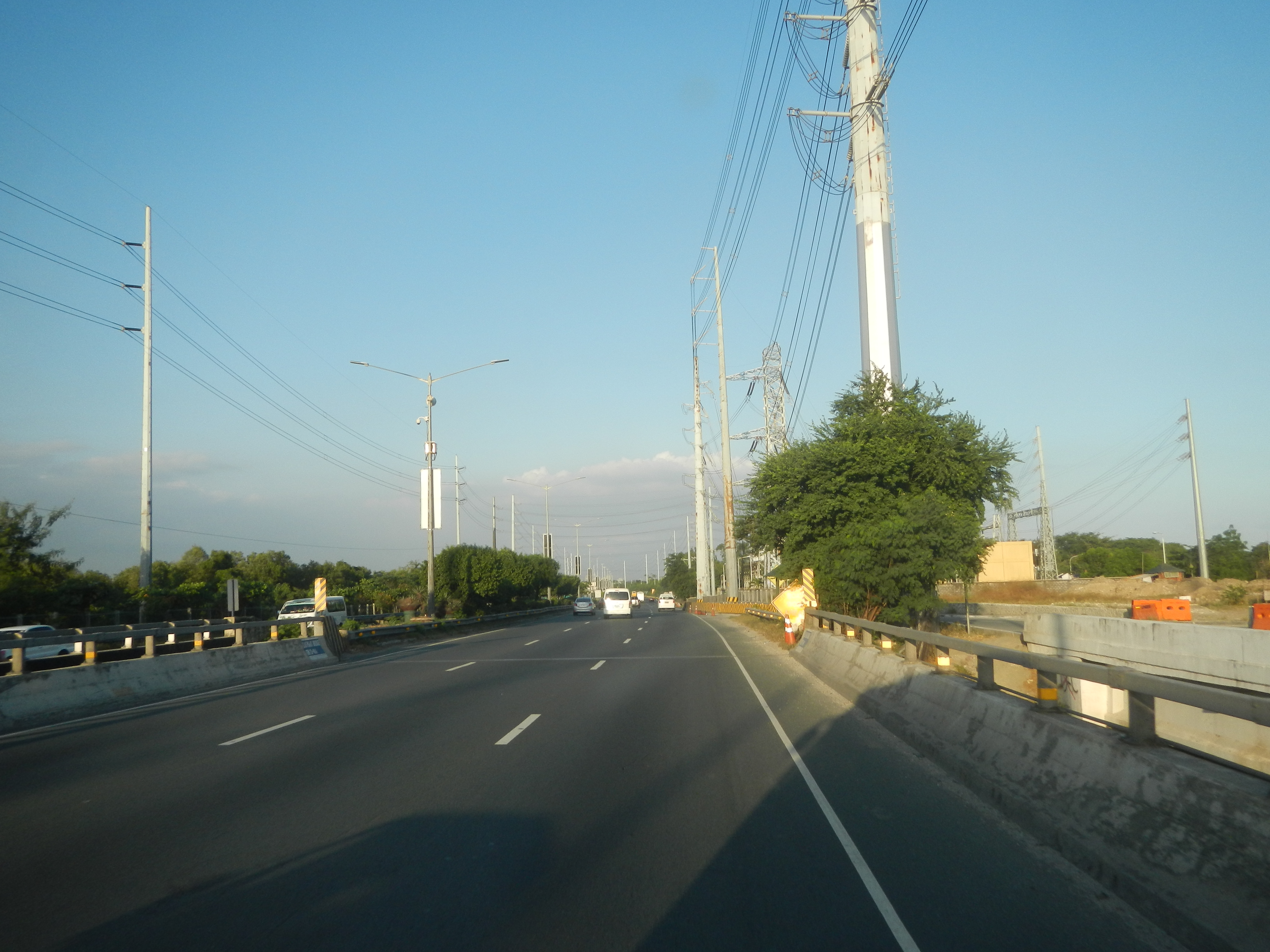
- View of the driving lane of the Las Piñas Bridge
- Coordinates: 14°28′36.03″N 120°58′19.59″E
- Carries: Carries northbound and southbound vehicles over the Las Piñas River for the Manila–Cavite Expressway (CAVITEX)
- Crosses: Las Piñas River
- Locale: Las Piñas, Metro Manila, Philippines
- Maintained by: Cavitex Infrastructure Corporation (CIC); Philippine Reclamation Authority (PRA); PEATC

Characteristics
- Design: Beam bridge

Location
- Interactive map of Las Piñas Bridge

Las Piñas Bridge is a highway bridge located in Las Piñas, Metro Manila, Philippines. It carries the mainline carriageway of the Manila–Cavite Expressway (CAVITEX, designated as E3) across the mouth of the Las Piñas River as it empties into Bacoor Bay.

== History and expansion ==
As part of the Segment 1 (R-1) section of CAVITEX—a 6.48-kilometer (4.03 mi) expressway stretching from Seaside Drive in Parañaque to Zapote in Las Piñas—Las Piñas Bridge serves as one of the three major mainline bridges along the tollway, alongside Wawa Bridge and Parañaque Bridge.

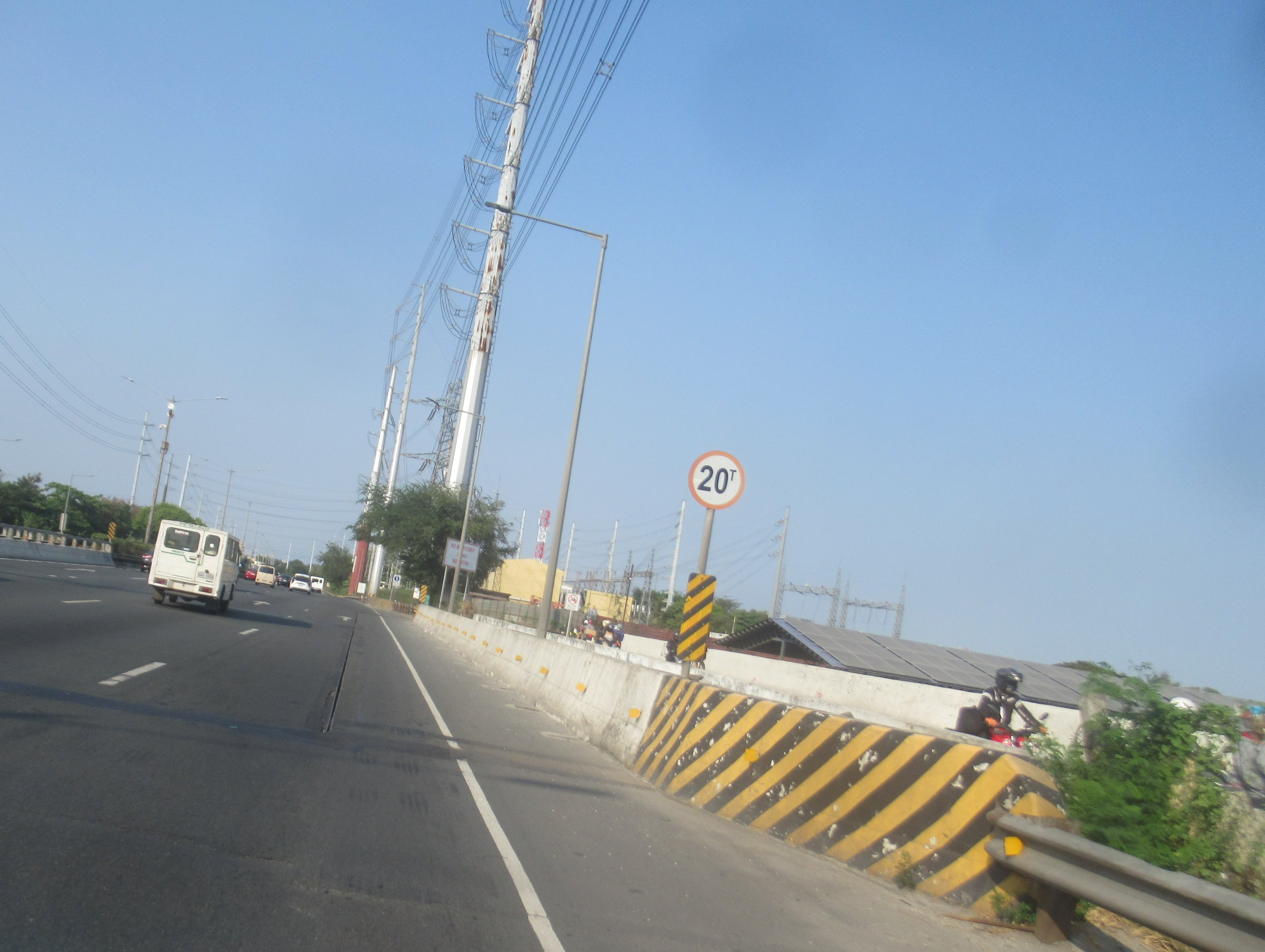
Upon entry to the bridge

The bridge underwent a major expansion project under Phase 2 of the ₱1.1-billion R-1 enhancement project aimed at increasing road capacity and alleviating congestion along the expressway corridor in between 2018 and 2020. The project involved the physical widening of Wawa Bridge, Parañaque Bridge, and Las Piñas Bridge. The project also included the main carriageway from Las Piñas Bridge to Zapote Interchange.

The formal execution of Phase 2 road enhancements eventually began in June 2019, with construction work resuming in May 2020 following temporary suspensions due to COVID-19 community quarantines.

In September 2022, CAVITEX announced the closure of some parts of the bridge of the Cavite-bound (southbound) outermost lane of the bridge. The first closure was done from September 6 to 9, 2022, affecting the rightmost lane, and from September 10 to 17, the third outer lane will be closed down for maintenance work.

== See also ==
- List of bridges in the Philippines
- Manila–Cavite Expressway
- Wawa Bridge
