= Bacoor Boulevard =

Road in Cavite, Philippines

- Molino Boulevard
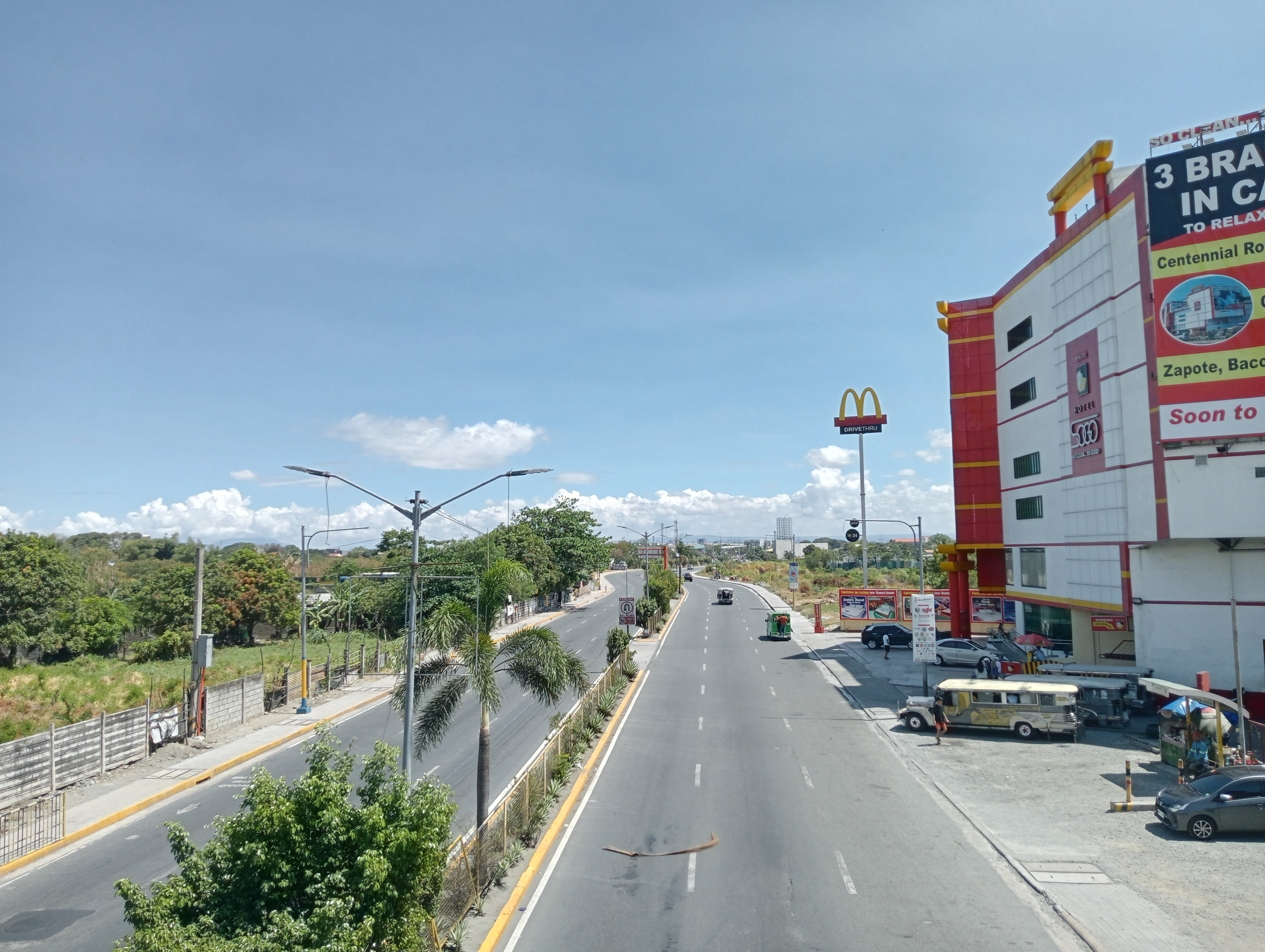
- Bacoor Boulevard taken near Bacoor Junction

Route information
- Maintained by Department of Public Works and Highways
- Existed: 2009–present
- Component highways: N62 Aguinaldo Highway; Molino Road

Major junctions
- West end: Bacoor Junction: N62 Aguinaldo Highway; N62 Aguinaldo Boulevard
- Niog Road; Bacoor–Imus Diversion Road; Palico Daanan; Bayanan Road
- East end: Molino Road

Location
- Country: Philippines
- Provinces: Cavite
- Major cities: Bacoor

Highway system
- Roads in the Philippines; Highways; Expressways; List

Bacoor Boulevard, formerly known as Molino Boulevard, is a major six-lane arterial thoroughfare in Bacoor, Cavite, Philippines. Officially opened in 2009, it serves as a primary east–west connecting corridor, easing traffic flow between central Bacoor and southern residential districts.

== Route description ==
Bacoor Boulevard's western terminus originates at the Bacoor Junction, an intersection connecting Aguinaldo Highway and Aguinaldo Boulevard.

Traversing southeast, the road passes through several residential subdivisions, commercial establishments, and key government infrastructure—including the Bacoor City Hall in Barangay Bayanan. It continues eastward until terminating at its junction with Molino Road in Barangay Molino 3.

== History ==
In the mid-2000s, the road was conceptualized and funded under the Countrywide Development Fund (CDF) as part of the regional highway expansion in the Cavite–Laguna (CALA) area. Early infrastructure studies by the Japan International Cooperation Agency (JICA) initially identified the road alignment for potential express conversion under proposed north–south expressway networks (NS-Way) via flyovers and viaducts.

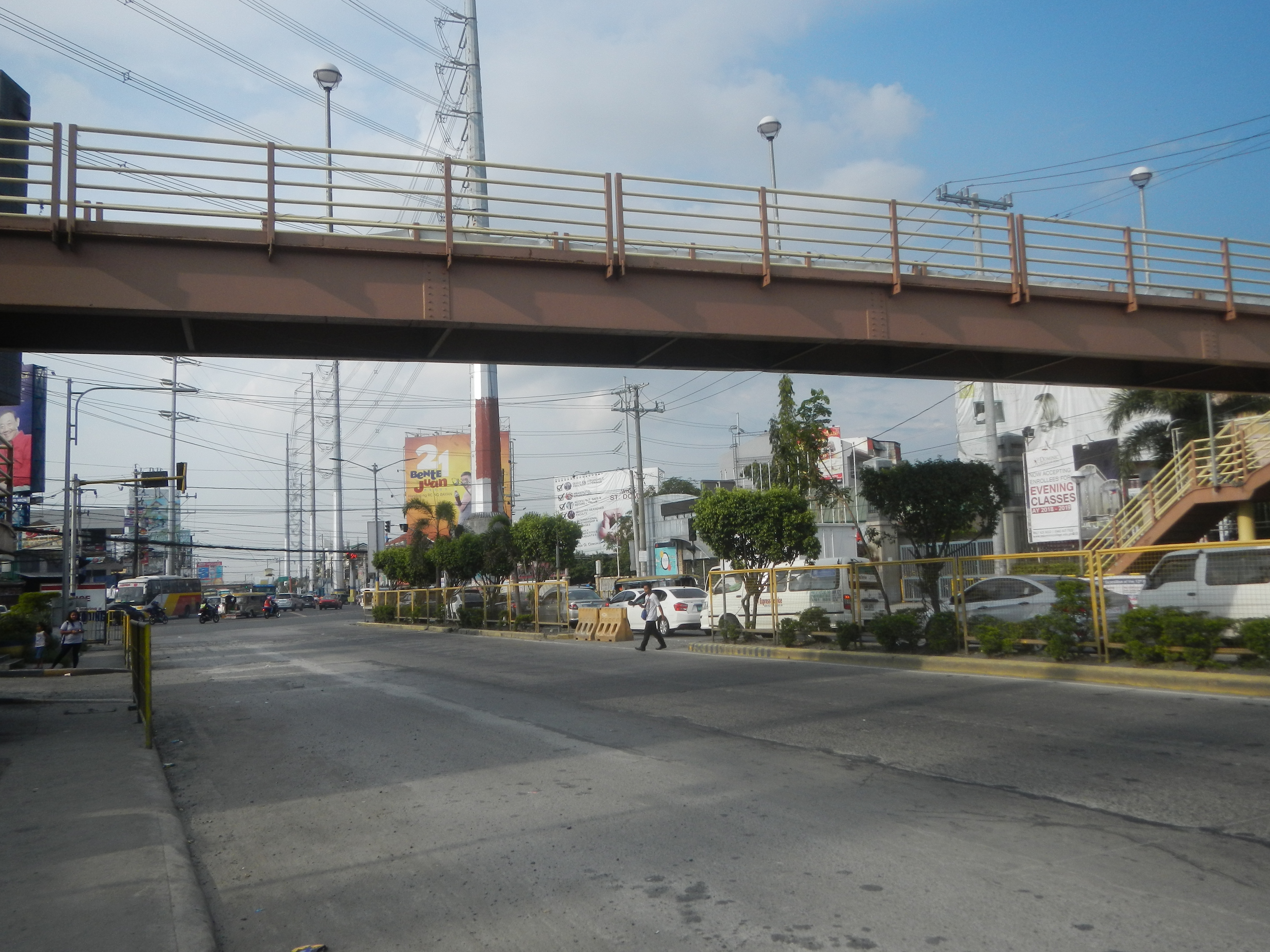
A footbridge over Bacoor Boulevard near its western terminus

Bacoor Boulevard was officially opened to public traffic in 2009 under the name Molino Boulevard. On January 26, 2015, the Sangguniang Panlungsod of Bacoor passed City Ordinance No. CO 3-2015, formally requesting the renaming of the highway and ranaming it locally "Bacoor Boulevard" as many has been often confused with the Molino–Salawag–Paliparan Road.

On June 29, 2018, President Rodrigo Duterte signed Republic Act No. 11049, officially renaming Molino Boulevard to Bacoor Boulevard as a national road corridor.
