= Dasmariñas–Las Piñas 230kV =

High-voltage overhead power line based in the Philippines

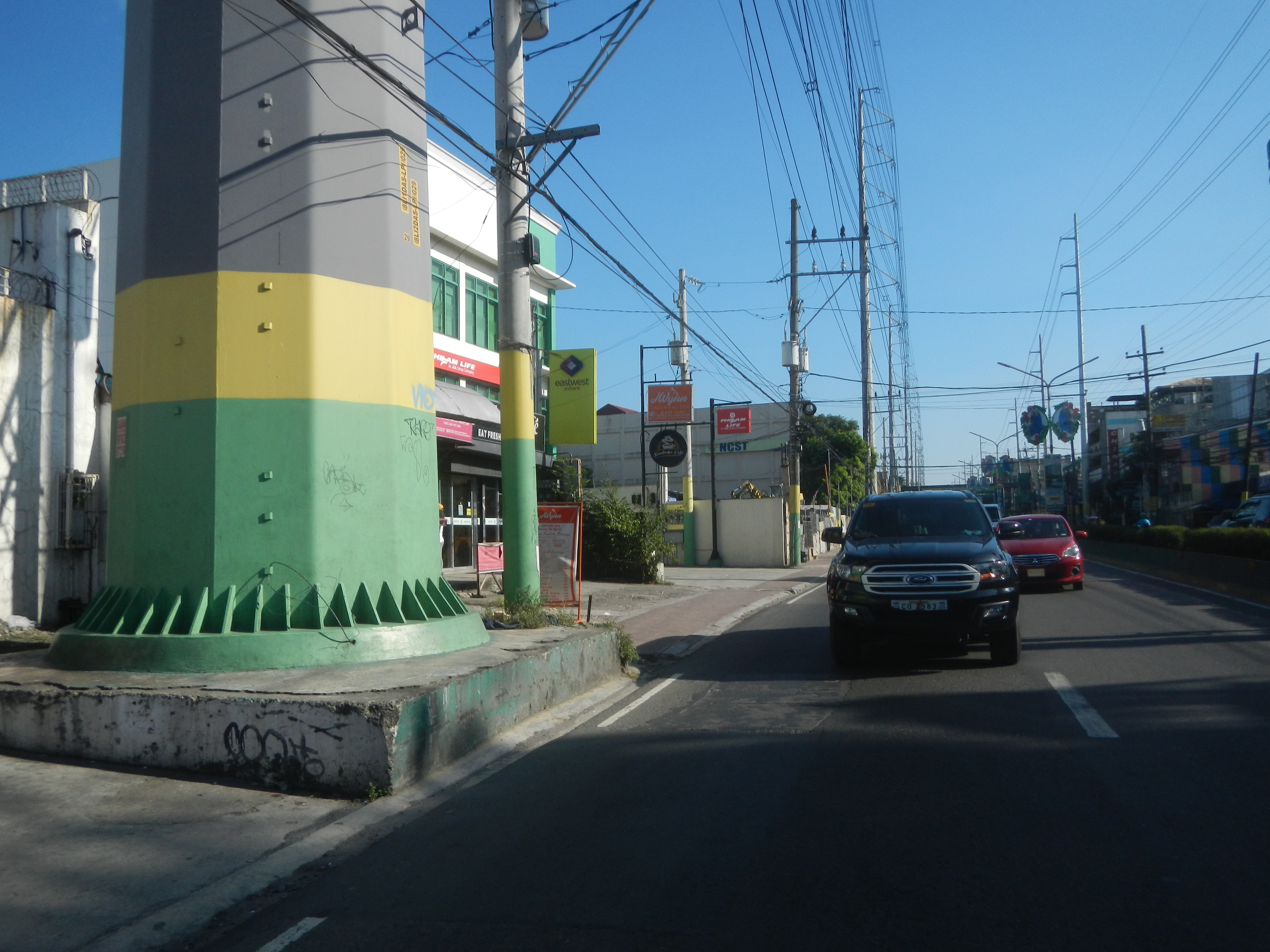
- Some of its steel poles along Aguinaldo Highway in Dasmariñas, Cavite.

Location
- Country: Philippines
- Province: Cavite; Metro Manila
- Coordinates: 14°18′41″N 120°57′9″E; 14°28′38″N 120°58′25″E
- From: Dasmariñas Substation
- To: Las Piñas Substation

Ownership information
- Owner: see Technical description
- Operator: see Technical description

Construction information
- Construction started: May 27, 1998; 28 years ago
- Commissioned: July 15, 1999; 27 years ago

Technical information
- Type: Overhead transmission line
- Current type: HVAC
- Total length: 21 km (13 mi)
- No. of towers: 210 (209 steel poles and 1 lattice tower)
- AC voltage: 230 kV
- No. of poles: 209
- No. of circuits: 2

The Dasmariñas–Las Piñas Transmission Line (abbreviated as 8LI1DAS-LPI, 8LI2DAS-LPI) and commonly known as Dasmariñas–Las Piñas 230kV is a 230,000 volt, double-circuit transmission line in Metro Manila and Calabarzon, Philippines that connects Dasmariñas and Las Piñas substations of National Grid Corporation of the Philippines (NGCP).

== History ==
The Dasmariñas – Las Piñas Transmission Line finished construction in July 15, 1999 but the power line only went into service when the Las Piñas substation was commissioned on November 30, 2001.

Throughout its existence, several steel poles were painted with aluminum paint to protect them from corrosion.

== Route description ==
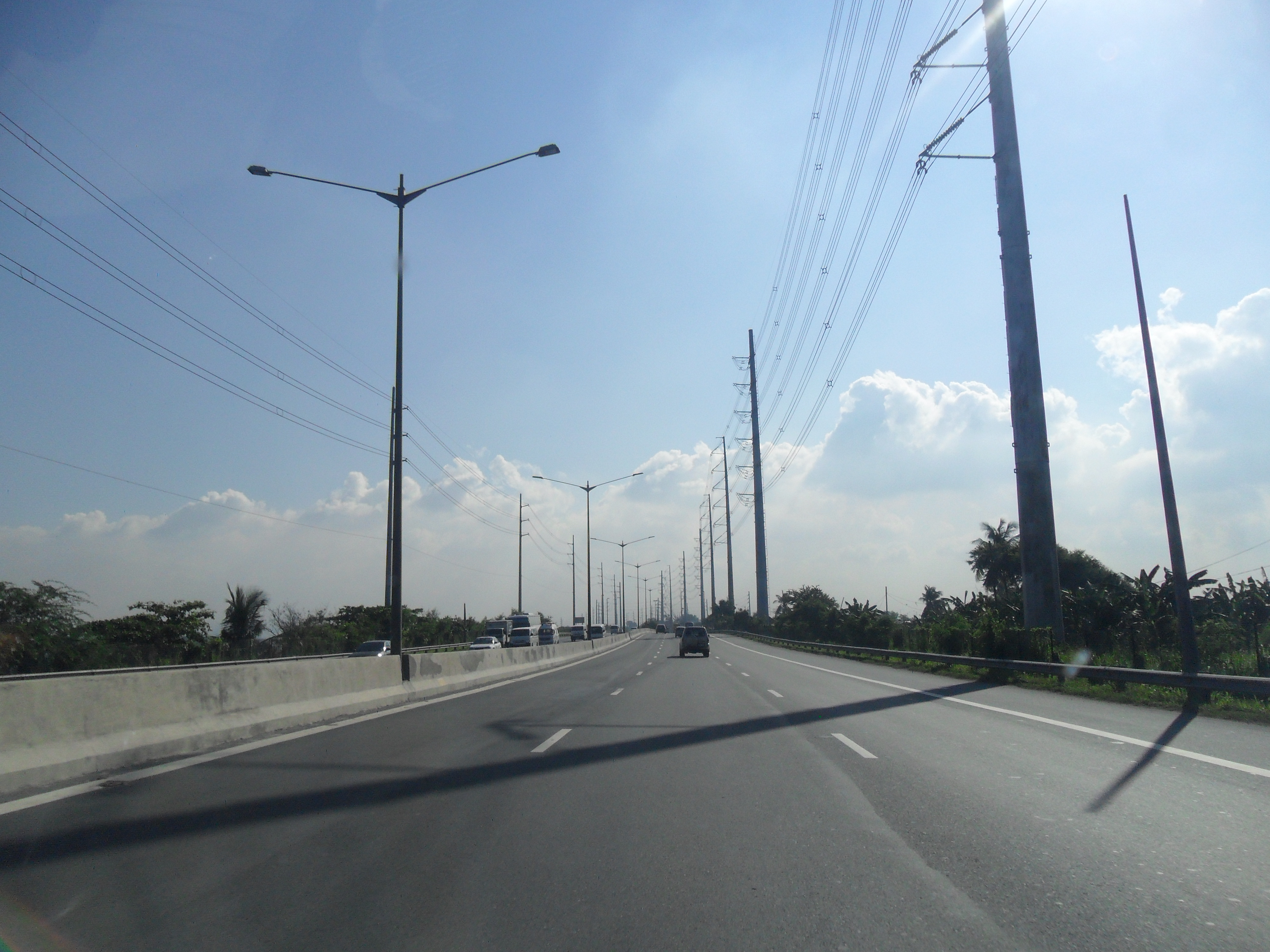
Steel poles 202–209 (with 202, 204, 205, and 208 are suspension towers and have flag design while 203, 206, 207, and 209 are anchor towers) along Manila-Cavite Expressway (CAVITEX) in Las Piñas, Metro Manila and Bacoor, Cavite.

The Dasmariñas – Las Piñas Transmission Line passes through the cities of Dasmariñas, Imus, and Bacoor in Cavite, and Las Piñas in Metro Manila. It is located within the service area of NGCP's South Luzon Operations and Maintenance (SLOM) District 1 (South Western Tagalog).

The transmission line starts at Dasmariñas substation, turns left into Ramona Tirona Avenue, and run parallel with Aguinaldo Highway until Bacoor. Upon approaching Bacoor Junction, it will parallel with Aguinaldo Boulevard until Bacoor Exit of Manila-Cavite Expressway (CAVITEX). It then utilize the eastern side of CAVITEX until its terminus at Las Piñas substation.

== Ownership, operations, and maintenance information ==
The transmission line was originally operated, maintained, and owned by the government-owned National Power Corporation (NAPOCOR/NPC) from November 30, 2001 to March 1, 2003. Operations, maintenance, and ownership of the line then transferred to another government corporation National Transmission Corporation (TransCo) on March 1, 2003 where it operated and maintained the line until January 15, 2009. The line's operations and maintenance was transferred to privately owned National Grid Corporation of the Philippines (NGCP) on January 15, 2009, where it now operates and maintains the power line since then.

As a result of the turnover from TransCo to NGCP, and Republic Act (RA) 9511 and concession agreement between both parties which authorized the latter to exercise the right of eminent domain necessary for the construction, expansion, and efficient maintenance and operation of the transmission system and grid and the efficient operation and maintenance of the subtransmission systems which have not yet been disposed by TransCo where NGCP acts as the temporary owner of these assets and facilities and they will be transferred to TransCo once the 50-year NGCP concession period ends on December 1, 2058, lands where the transmission structures stand and their pedestals or foundations and right-of-way or portions of a power line acquired and designated, and facilities built or placed whether using secondhand (NAPOCOR/NPC and TransCo-era) with a new function or entirely new structures from January 15, 2009 (steel pole 208A) are operated, maintained, and owned by NGCP, while those that were placed or built, acquired, and designated from November 30, 2001 to January 14, 2009 are owned by TransCo and operated and maintained by NGCP, as one mandate of the former is to handle all existing cases, including right-of-way and claims which accrued prior to the transfer of power grid operations and maintenance to the latter on January 15, 2009. Table showing the ownership information on each lands where the structures and their respective foundations and pedestals stand, and right of way is on the technical description section.

== Technical description ==
=== Engineering ===
The chief engineer of the line were not fully disclosed. Every pole measures approximately 60m, consisting of 6 insulator units. These insulator units are the braced line post (BLP) and dead-end strain insulators.

=== Design ===
The design of the line and poles were said to minimize the rights-of-way (ROW) footprint. Because Dasmariñas is an urban city/municipality and Las Piñas substation is located near CAVITEX, the line follows a design as a single-sided, unified parallel and double circuit vertical stack design convention, often used in some lines such as the Bay–Biñan 230kV, where the Calamba and Biñan segments feature taller poles to minimize the aforementioned footprint.

=== Hardware ===
==== Suspension insulators ====
Most of the suspension insulators used are the braced line post (BLP) as part of the design convention. This also minimizes the ROW size, making land acquisition easier. The BLP design base is based on North Luzon transmission lines. It is then modified to accommodate quadruple bundle per phase.

The number of disc insulators was 16 in the suspension string and 115+115kV in the post insulator. It is then attached into a wedge rounded plate made out of thick steel.

Though that the post insulator is 230kV, there is a room for a safety margin (e.g. 240/270kV).

==== Dead-end insulators and post insulators ====
The strain insulators were directly attached into the pole via the pre-welded mounts, which are the thick sheets welded into the pole itself. Jumper wires were drawn from the strain clamps and jumps or loops into another strain clamps on the other side. It is supported by the post insulator.

The post insulator for 230kV is combination of a 115kV and 115kV post insulators joined together by a fixed joint and a pivot point is the X-axis dependent joint (on the pole).

The latter has a safety margin, meaning ratings can maximize out of the maximum voltage of a line (e.g. 240/270kV).

==== Operations and Maintenance (O&M) ====
Components and operations, maintenance, and ownership information
Owner	Number of lands and structures owned	Percentage (by number of lands and structures)
National Transmission Corporation	209 (steel poles)	99.52%
National Grid Corporation of the Philippines (owned, operated, and maintained)	1 (lattice tower)	0.48%
