= Aguinaldo Highway =

Major highway in Cavite, Philippines

Coordinates: 14°17′4″N 120°57′35″E

R-2 Aguinaldo Highway

- Aguinaldo Highway highlighted in red

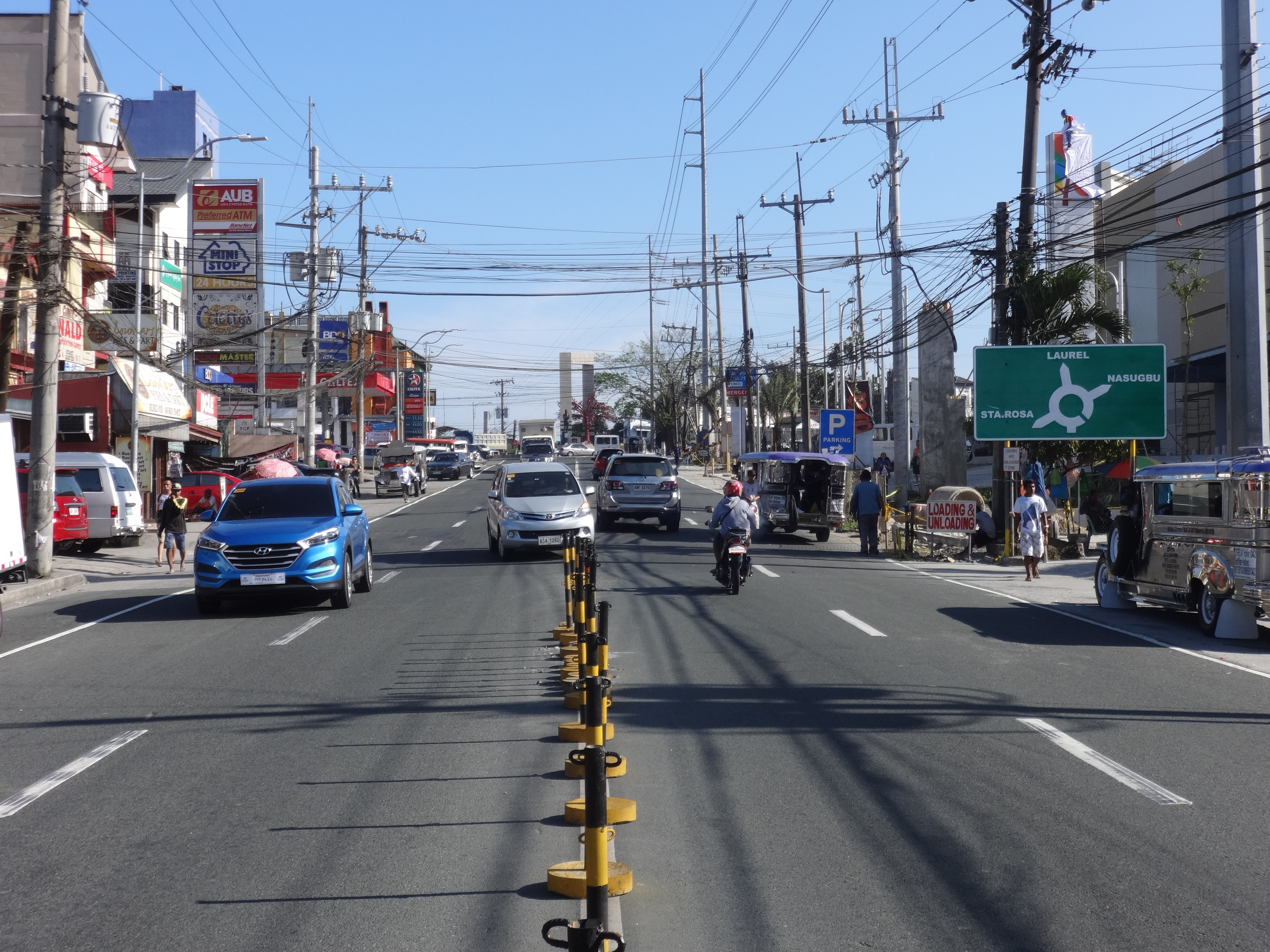
- Aguinaldo Highway looking south towards Tagaytay Rotonda in Tagaytay

Route information
- Maintained by the Department of Public Works and Highways
- Length: 41.4 km (25.7 mi)
- Component highways: R-2 R-2; N62 in Bacoor; N419 from Bacoor to Dasmariñas; N410 in Silang and Tagaytay

Major junctions
- North end: Zapote Bridge at Las Piñas–Bacoor boundary
- N62 (Aguinaldo Boulevard) in Bacoor; N62 (Tirona Highway) in Bacoor; N65 (Governor's Drive) in Dasmariñas; E3 (Cavite–Laguna Expressway)
- South end: N410 (Tagaytay–Nasugbu Highway) / N421 (Tagaytay–Calamba Road) / Tagaytay–Talisay Road in Tagaytay

Location
- Country: Philippines
- Provinces: Cavite
- Major cities: Bacoor, Imus, Dasmariñas, Tagaytay
- Towns: Silang

Highway system
- Roads in the Philippines; Highways; Expressways; List

The Emilio Aguinaldo Highway, commonly known as Aguinaldo Highway and officially the Cavite–Batangas Road, is a four-to-six-lane, 41.4-kilometer (25.7 mi) national highway in the province of Cavite, Philippines. It is one of the province's three major arterial roads, alongside Governor's Drive and Antero Soriano Highway, and serves as its principal north–south highway.

The highway extends from Zapote Bridge on the boundary between Bacoor and Las Piñas to Tagaytay. It passes through the cities of Bacoor, Imus, and Dasmariñas, and the municipalities of Silang and Alfonso. It forms part of National Routes 62, 419, and 410 of the Philippine highway network. The highway is named after General Emilio Aguinaldo, the first president of the Philippines and a native of Cavite.

== Route description ==
Drone shot of Aguinaldo Highway in Bacoor

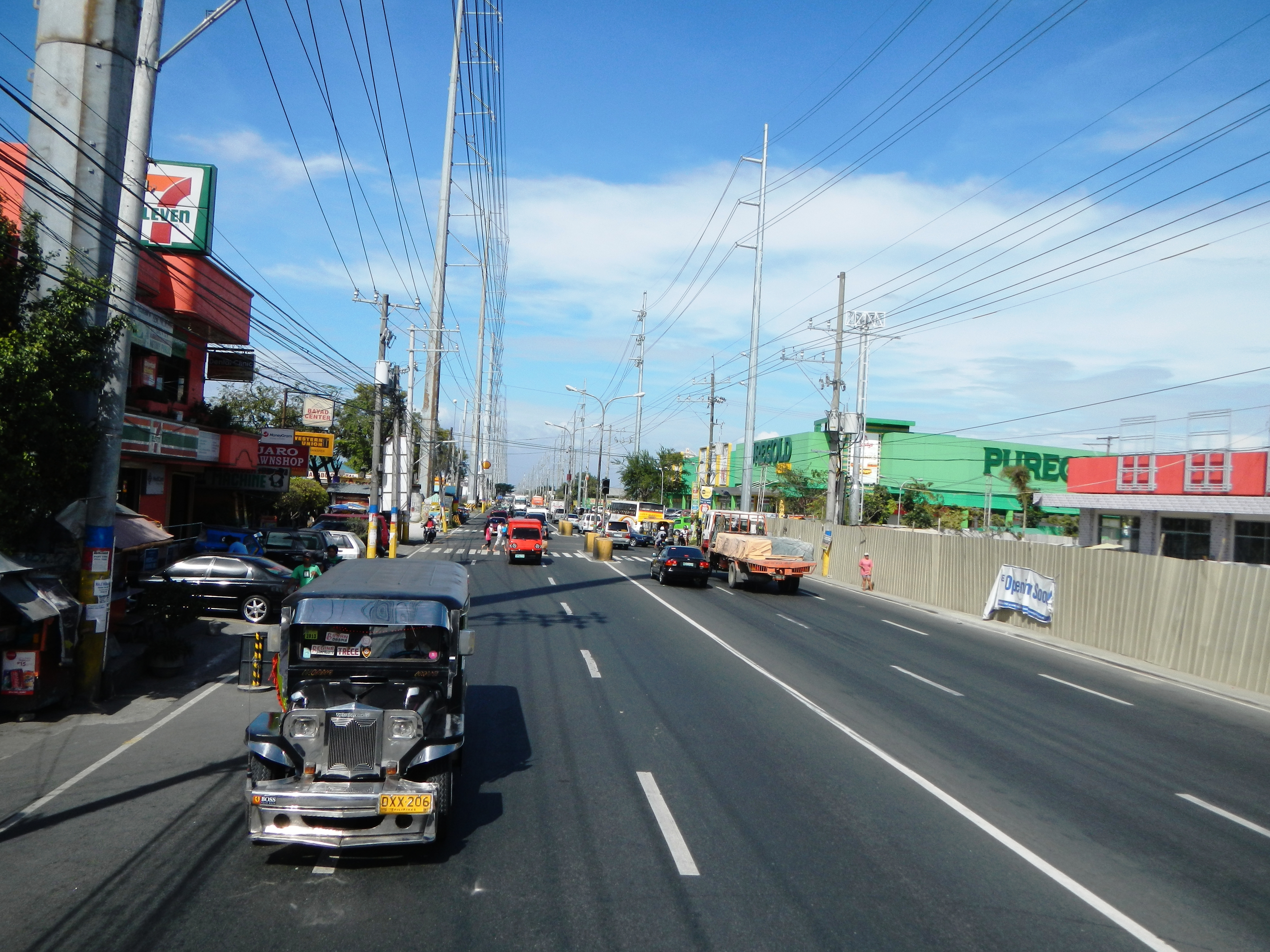
Aguinaldo Highway looking south towards Nueno Avenue in Imus.

Aguinaldo Highway passes through many establishments such as malls, shops, and government offices. Various high voltage power lines, most notably the Dasmariñas-Las Piñas transmission line of National Grid Corporation of the Philippines (NGCP), utilize the highway right of way from its intersection with Aguinaldo Boulevard and Bacoor Boulevard to Barangay San Agustin II, Dasmariñas for accessibility to work vehicles and also due to scarcity of land for the acquisition of right of way and lands where the steel poles stand.

Originally with four lanes, it starts as a continuation of Diego Cera Avenue at Zapote Bridge. It crosses and becomes a six-lane road past Bacoor Boulevard which leads to Molino, Bacoor, and Aguinaldo Boulevard, which connects with Manila–Cavite Expressway. It then intersects with Tirona Highway, which leads to Kawit and Cavite City. It then passes Imus and enters Dasmariñas, where it reduces to a four-lane road and becoming a divided highway in most portions. Afterwards, it then intersects with Governor's Drive and Pala-Pala Road in Dasmariñas.

Past Pala-Pala Road, it begins its climb to Tagaytay, passing Silang and ends at Tagaytay Rotonda. The highway continues as Tagaytay–Nasugbu Highway towards the province of Batangas.

=== Alternative names ===
The segment of Aguinaldo Highway north of Tirona Highway in Bacoor and part of N62 is alternatively known as Manila–Cavite Road, as the road network indirectly connects Cavite and Manila. South of Tirona Highway, it is alternatively known as Cavite–Batangas Road, historically serving as the link between Cavite and Batangas, forming N419 and part of N410. An exception is the unnumbered section bypassing the Silang poblacion, which is alternatively known as the Silang By-pass Road or Silang Diversion Road. In Tagaytay, it is alternatively known as Tagaytay–Manila via Silang Road, which is also applied up to its southern logical continuation, Tagaytay–Nasugbu Road, up to the eastern end of Mahogany Avenue. Additionally, the name Aguinaldo Highway is also alternatively applied to the Tagaytay segment of Tagaytay–Nasugbu Road.

== History ==
The present road originated from an old road that enters Cavite from Las Piñas. The old roads that predated the Aguinaldo Highway used a different alignment on Bacoor and Imus, that exist until today as a mixture of city-maintained roads and national roads. Portions of the road have been sites of battles of the Philippine Revolution.

During the American colonial era, the road reached as far as Silang. From 1933 to 1935, the section of the highway from Silang to Tagaytay was constructed using prisoners as construction workers. In 1938, the highway was made into concrete by President Manuel L. Quezon. The old roads that passed on the western barangays of Bacoor and Imus are bypassed by a new alignment that existed until today. The road formed part of Highway 17 that linked Imus with Batangas. It was also part of the Cavite-Manila South Road, which was renamed to Mexico Road in 1964, the year designated as "The Year of Philippine-Mexican Friendship."

On May 27, 1998, the traffic jam happened in southern side of the highway. It was caused by National Power Corporation (NAPOCOR/NPC) transmission line construction of the billion peso Dasmariñas–Las Piñas Transmission Line, with the line finished construction on July 15, 1999.

== Intersections ==
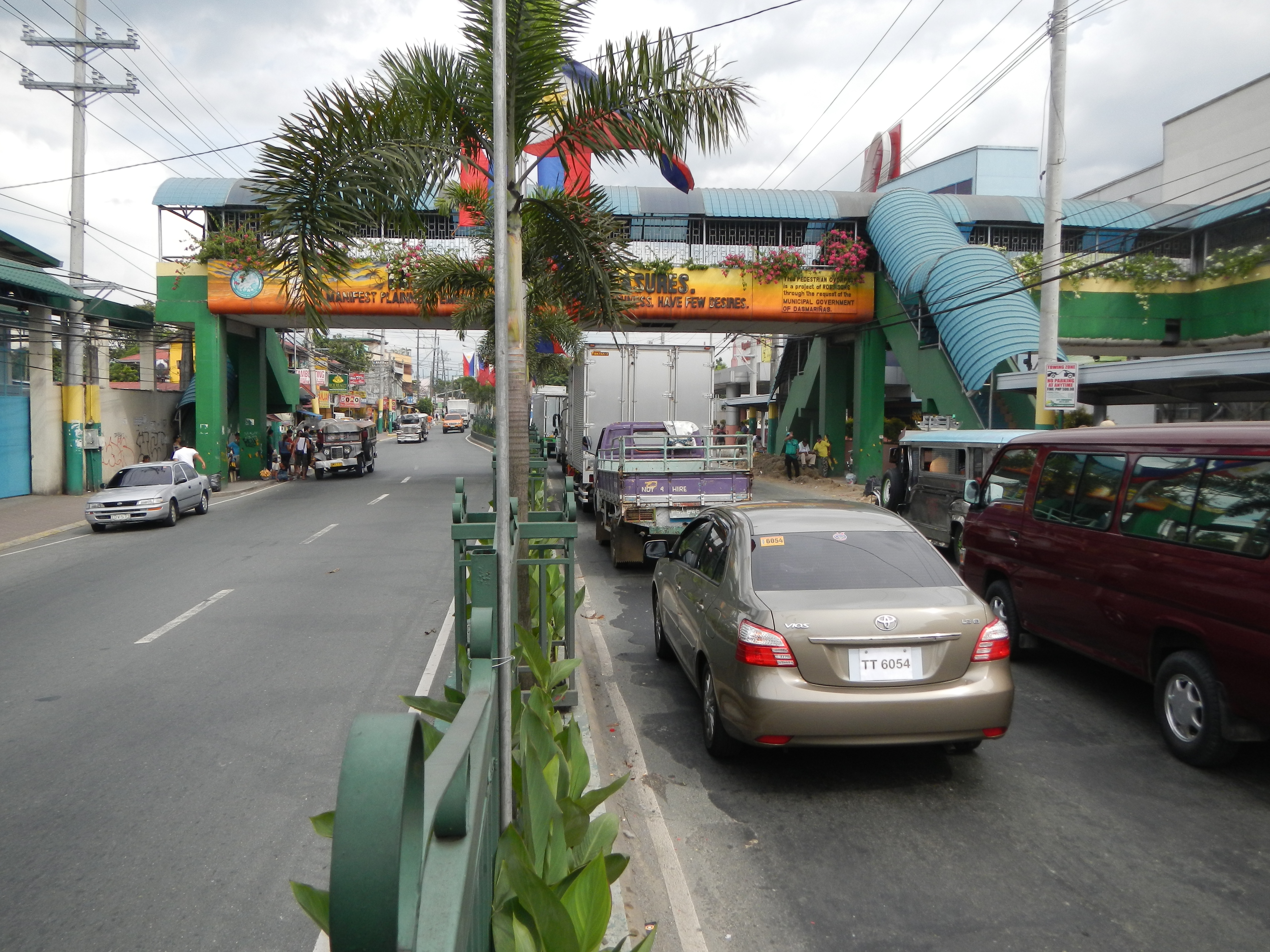
Aguinaldo Highway, alternately and unofficially Aguinaldo Boulevard, in Dasmariñas

The entire route is located in Cavite. Intersections are numbered by kilometer posts, with Rizal Park in Manila designated as kilometer zero.

City/Municipality	km	mi	Destinations	Notes
Las Piñas–Bacoor boundary	14.846	9.225	Zapote Bridge over Zapote River; Las Piñas-Muntinlupa District Engineering Office–Cavite Sub District Engineering Office highway boundary (Northern terminus. Continues north as N62 (Diego Cera Avenue).	
Bacoor			N62 (Aguinaldo Boulevard) / Bacoor Boulevard – Paliparan, Dasmariñas	Traffic light intersection
Bacoor	17.456	10.847	N62 (Tirona Highway) – Kawit	Traffic light intersection. Route number change from N62 to N419.
Bacoor–Imus boundary	18.943	11.771	Cavite Sub District Engineering Office–Cavite 1st District Engineering Office highway boundary	
Imus			NOMO Avenue (Imus-Bacoor Diversion Road)	
Imus			Buhay na Tubig Road	Traffic light intersection
Imus			Palico Daanan Road	
Imus	20.050	12.458	Imus Bridge over Imus River	
Imus			Nueno Avenue	Traffic light intersection
Imus			Patindig Araw Road	
Imus			NIA Road	
Imus			Daang Hari / Open Canal Road	At-grade interchange; traffic light intersection
Imus–Dasmariñas boundary	26.998	16.776	Cavite 1st District Engineering Office–Cavite Sub District Engineering Office highway boundary	
Dasmariñas			J.T. Paterno Boulevard – Imus	Southbound access only
Dasmariñas			Jose Abad Santos Avenue (Salitran Road)	Traffic light intersection
Dasmariñas			Guevarra Street	Traffic light intersection
Dasmariñas			Camerino Avenue	Traffic light intersection
Dasmariñas			Congressional Avenue	Traffic light intersection. Serves De La Salle University - Dasmariñas Campus.
Dasmariñas			Central Market Avenue	Traffic light intersection
Dasmariñas			Don Placido Campos Avenue	Unsignalized intersection
Dasmariñas			Ramon Tirona Avenue	
Dasmariñas			N65 (Juanito Remulla Avenue/ Governor's Drive) – Trece Martires, Biñan	Traffic light intersection
Dasmariñas			N65 (Pala-Pala Road)	Traffic light intersection
Dasmariñas			UTS Boulevard	Traffic light intersection
Dasmariñas–Silang boundary	38.985	24.224	Route number change from N419 to N410	
Silang			E3 (CALAX)	Silang (Aguinaldo) Exit of CALAX
Silang			N410 (J.P. Rizal Street)	Change from N410 to unnumbered route
Silang			Silang–Banaybanay Road	Traffic light intersection
Silang			N410 (J.P. Rizal Street)	Changed from unnumbered route to N410
Silang			East–West Lateral Road	
Silang			Buho–Amadeo Road	
Silang–Tagaytay boundary	53.763	33.407	Cavite Sub District Engineering Office–Cavite 2nd District Engineering Office highway boundary	
Tagaytay			Tagaytay Bypass Road	
Tagaytay	56.894	35.352	N410 (Tagaytay–Nasugbu Highway) / N421 (Tagaytay–Calamba Road) / Tagaytay–Talisay Road	Roundabout. Southern Terminus.
1.000 mi = 1.609 km; 1.000 km = 0.621 mi: Incomplete access; Route transition
