= Parañaque Bridge =

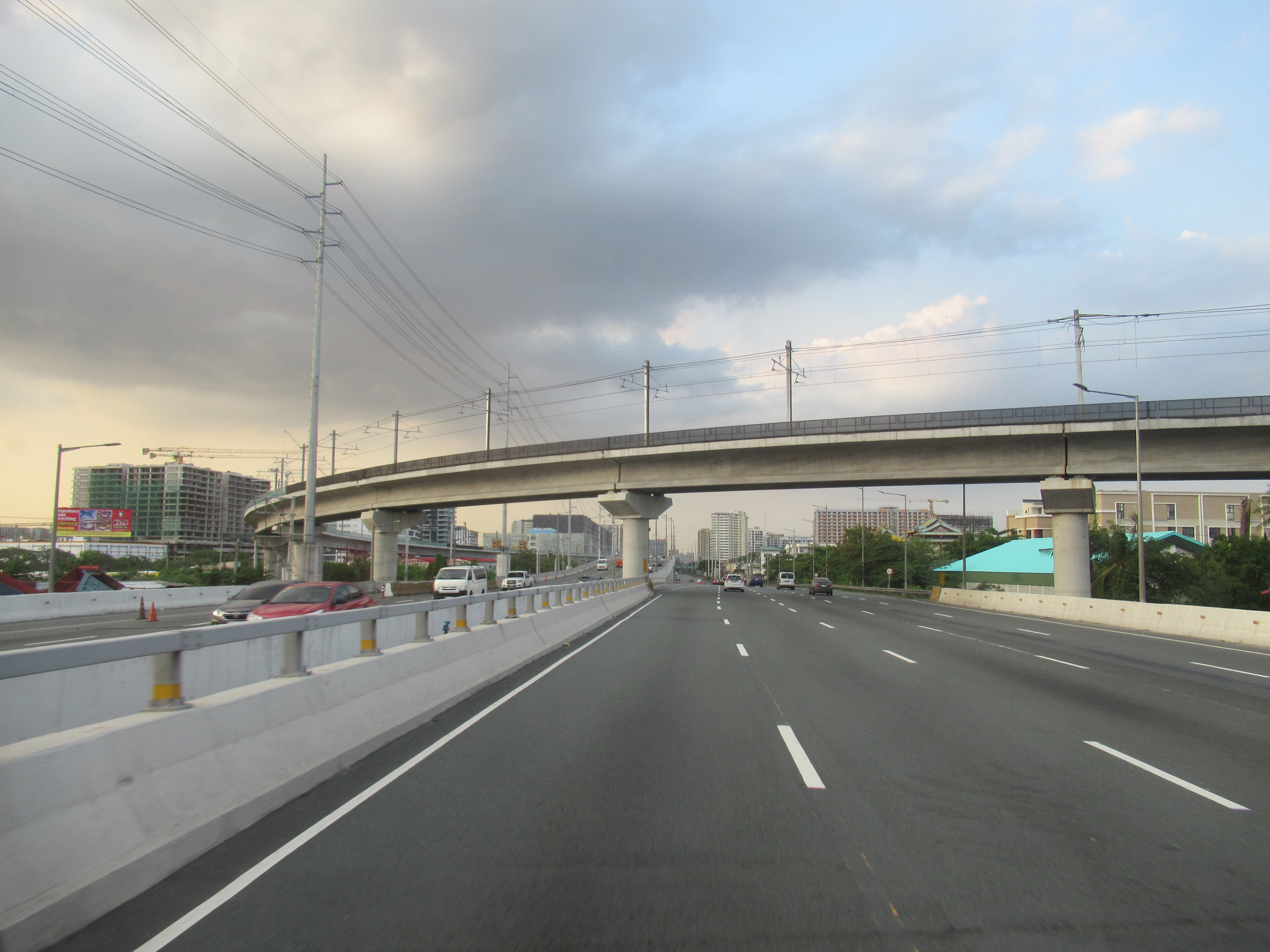
- View of the driving lane of Parañaque Bridge
- Coordinates: 14°30′08.4″N 120°59′23.9″E
- Carries: Carries northbound and southbound vehicles of Manila–Cavite Expressway
- Crosses: Parañaque River
- Locale: Parañaque, Metro Manila, Philippines
- Maintained by: Cavitex Infrastructure Corporation (CIC); Philippine Reclamation Authority (PRA); PEATC

Characteristics
- Design: Concrete girder bridge

Statistics
- Toll: Integrated with CAVITEX toll system

Location
- Interactive map of Parañaque Bridge

The Parañaque Bridge is a highway bridge located in Parañaque, Metro Manila, Philippines. It carries the mainline carriageway of the Manila–Cavite Expressway (CAVITEX, designated as E3) across the mouth of the Parañaque River as it empties into Manila Bay.

Alongside the Las Piñas Bridge and Wawa Bridge, it is one of the three primary mainline bridges forming the original 6.48-kilometer (4.03 mi) Segment 1 of CAVITEX.

== History and expansion ==
As part of the continuous infrastructure upgrades along CAVITEX Segment 1—which stretches from Seaside Drive in Parañaque to Zapote in Las Piñas—operator Cavite Infrastructure Corporation (CIC) and Metro Pacific Tollways Corporation (MPTC) executed major bridge widening and pavement rehabilitation projects across its key water crossings.

In March 2020, the City Government of Parañaque and CAVITEX management implemented temporary lane closures along the Parañaque Bridge to facilitate girder installation, deck slab replacement, and bridge widening. The expansion aimed to increase vehicle capacity and ease recurring bottlenecks for daily commuters between Cavite and Metro Manila.

In September 2020, Light Rail Manila Corporation (LRMC) resumed full construction and girder launcher operations along the CAVITEX segment following community quarantine. The project involved installing heavy concrete piergirders and elevated tracks directly above the bridge structure to connect the extension from Redemptorist station to Dr. Santos station and onward toward Cavite.

== See also ==
- Las Piñas Bridge
- Manila–Cavite Expressway
- Pacific Avenue Flyover
- Parañaque River
- Wawa Bridge
