= Silang =

Silang may refer to:

== People ==
- Diego Silang (1730–1763), Filipino revolutionary leader who sought to establish an independent Ilocano state
- Gabriela Silang (1731–1763), first female leader of a Filipino movement for independence from Spain

== Places ==
- Silang, Cavite, a municipality in the province of Cavite, Philippines
- Bagong Silang, a barangay of Caloocan, Metro Manila, Philippines
