= Zapote River (Philippines) =

River in Luzon, Philippines

Zapote River Las Piñas–Zapote River
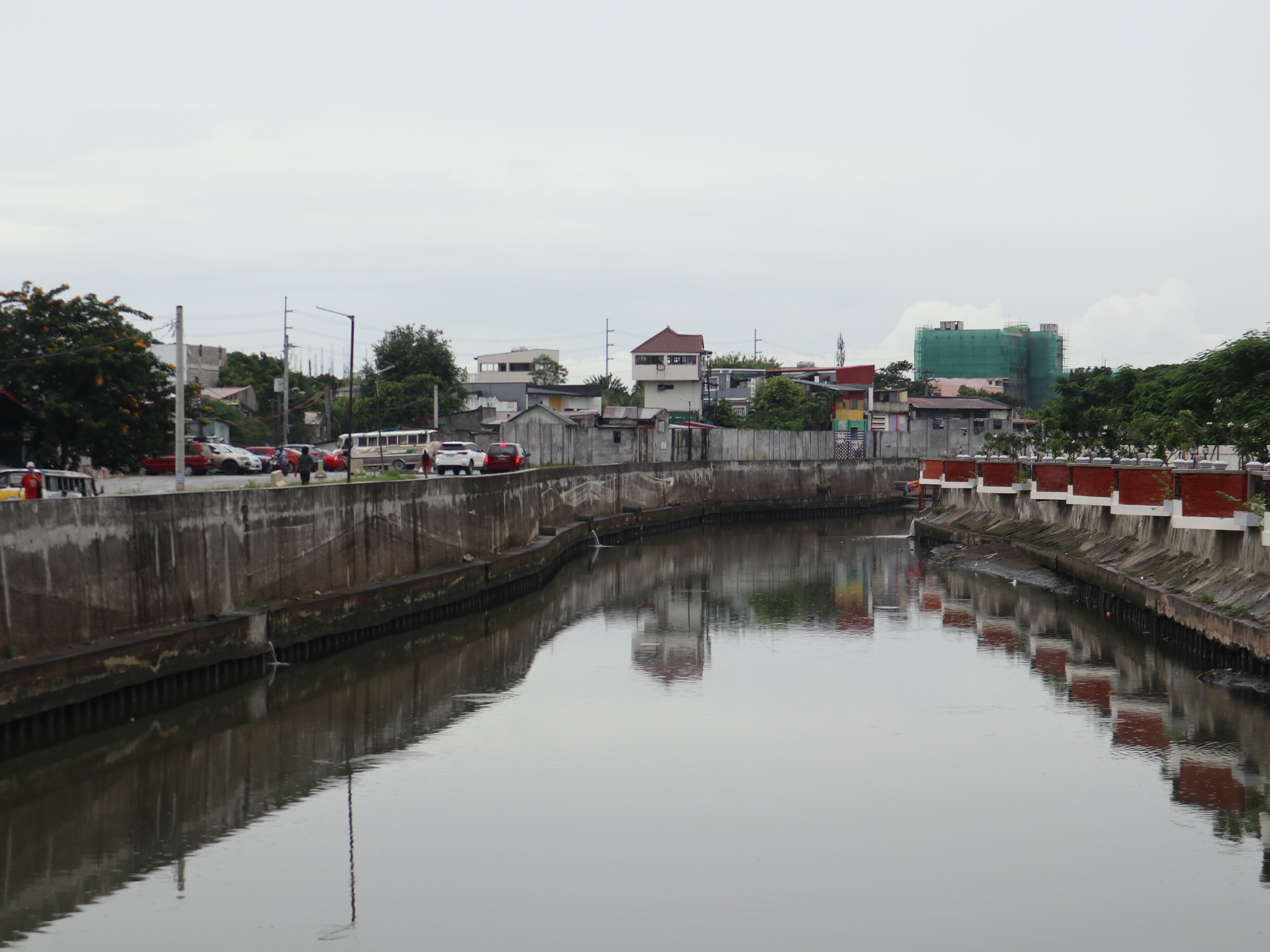
- Zapote River in 2021

- Zapote River mouth Zapote River (Philippines) (Luzon) Zapote River (Philippines) (Philippines)

Location
- Country: Philippines
- Region: Calabarzon; National Capital Region
- Province: Cavite; Laguna
- City: Bacoor; Dasmariñas; Las Piñas; Muntinlupa; San Pedro

Physical characteristics
- Mouth: Manila Bay
  - location: Las Piñas
  - coordinates: 14°28′31″N 120°58′13″E
  - elevation: 0 m (0 ft)
- Length: 5.81 km (3.61 mi)

Basin features
- River system: Alabang–Zapote River System

The Zapote River, also referred to as the Las Piñas–Zapote River, is a river in the Philippines located between the boundaries of the cities of Las Piñas and Muntinlupa in Metro Manila, Bacoor and Dasmariñas in Cavite, and San Pedro in Laguna. The river has a total length of 5.81 kilometers (3.61 mi).

== History ==
The Battle of Zapote River was fought on June 13, 1899, between 1,200 Americans and between 4,000~5,000 Filipinos. It was the second largest battle of the Philippine–American War after the Battle of Manila five months before in February 1899. The Zapote River separates the town of Las Piñas in what was then Manila province from Bacoor in the province of Cavite. The ruins of Zapote Bridge still stands next to its replacement bridge along Aguinaldo Highway.
