= 2007 Batangas local elections =

2007 Batangas gubernatorial election
- May 14, 2007
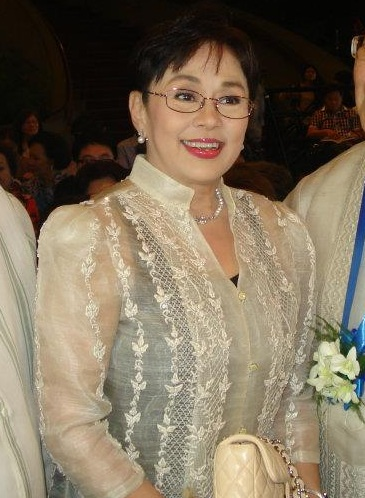
		KAMPI
Nominee	Vilma Santos-Recto	Armando Sanchez
Party	Lakas	KAMPI
Running mate	Edwin Ermita	Jose Antonio Leviste II
Popular vote	475,470	344,969
Percentage	55.31	40.11
Governor before election
Armando Sanchez
KAMPI
Elected Governor
Vilma Santos-Recto
Lakas

Local elections was held in the province of Batangas on May 14, 2007, as part of the 2007 Philippine general election. Voters will select candidates for all local positions: a town mayor, vice mayor and town councilors, as well as members of the Sangguniang Panlalawigan, the vice-governor, governor and representatives for the four districts of Batangas. The list below are the candidates as of May 2007.

== Gubernatorial election ==
=== For Governor ===
Incumbent Armando Sanchez is running for reelection. His main opponent is actress and Lipa mayor Vilma Santos-Recto.

Batangas gubernatorial election
Candidate	Party	Votes	%
Vilma Santos-Recto	Lakas–CMD	475,740	55.31
Armando Sanchez (incumbent)	Kabalikat ng Malayang Pilipino	344,969	40.11
Nestor Sanares	Pwersa ng Masang Pilipino	34,606	4.02
Marcos Mandanas Sr.	Independent	4,797	0.56
Total		860,112	100.00
Lakas–CMD gain from KAMPI			

=== For Vice Governor ===
Incumbent Richard Recto is running for 4th district representative. His seat will be contested by 4th district board member Mark Leviste, actor Christopher de Leon and Edwin Ermita, son of Executive Secretary Eduardo Ermita.

Batangas vice gubernatorial election
Candidate	Party
Jose Antonio Leviste II	Kabalikat ng Malayang Pilipino
Edwin Ermita	Lakas–CMD
Christopher de Leon	Pwersa ng Masang Pilipino
Total
KAMPI gain from Lakas–CMD	

== Congressional elections ==
=== 1st District ===
Incumbent Eileen Ermita-Buhain is running for a third and final term. Her opponent is Raymund Apacible.

2007 Philippine House of Representatives elections
Party	Candidate	Votes	%
Lakas	Eileen Ermita-Buhain	101,127	58.26
UNO	Raymund Apacible	72,448	41.74
Total votes		173,575	100.00
Lakas hold			

=== 2nd District ===
Incumbent Hermilando Mandanas is running for a second term. His opponents are Orestes Cabigao, Edgar Mendoza, and Luis Gutierrez.

2007 Philippine House of Representatives elections
Party	Candidate	Votes	%
Liberal	Hermilando Mandanas	149,362	77.51%
Lakas	Orestes Cabigao	22,481	11.67%
KAMPI	Edgar Mendoza	20,737	10.76%
Independent	Luis Gutierrez	131	0.07%
Total votes		192,711	100.00%
Liberal hold			

=== 3rd District ===
Incumbent Victoria Hernandez-Reyes is running for a third and final term, her opponent is Nelson Collantes.

2007 Philippine House of Representatives elections
Party	Candidate	Votes	%
Lakas	Victoria Hernandez-Reyes	107,869	56.24%
PMP	Nelson Collantes	83,917	43.76%
Total votes		191,786	100.00%
Lakas hold			

=== 4th District ===
Incumbent Oscar Gozos is eligible to run for another term. However, he ran for mayor of Lipa. Mark Llandro Mendoza, son of Transportation and Communications Secretary Leandro Mendoza is facing former board member Meynardo Sabili and Vice Governor Richard Recto.

2007 Philippine House of Representatives elections
Party	Candidate	Votes	%
NPC	Mark Llandro Mendoza	97,218	45.73%
LDP	Meynardo Sabili	90,184	42.43%
Lakas	Richard Recto	25,190	11.85%
Total votes		212,592	100.00%
NPC gain from LDP			
