= Presidential transition of Bongbong Marcos =

2022 Philippine political process

Transition team of Bongbong Marcos
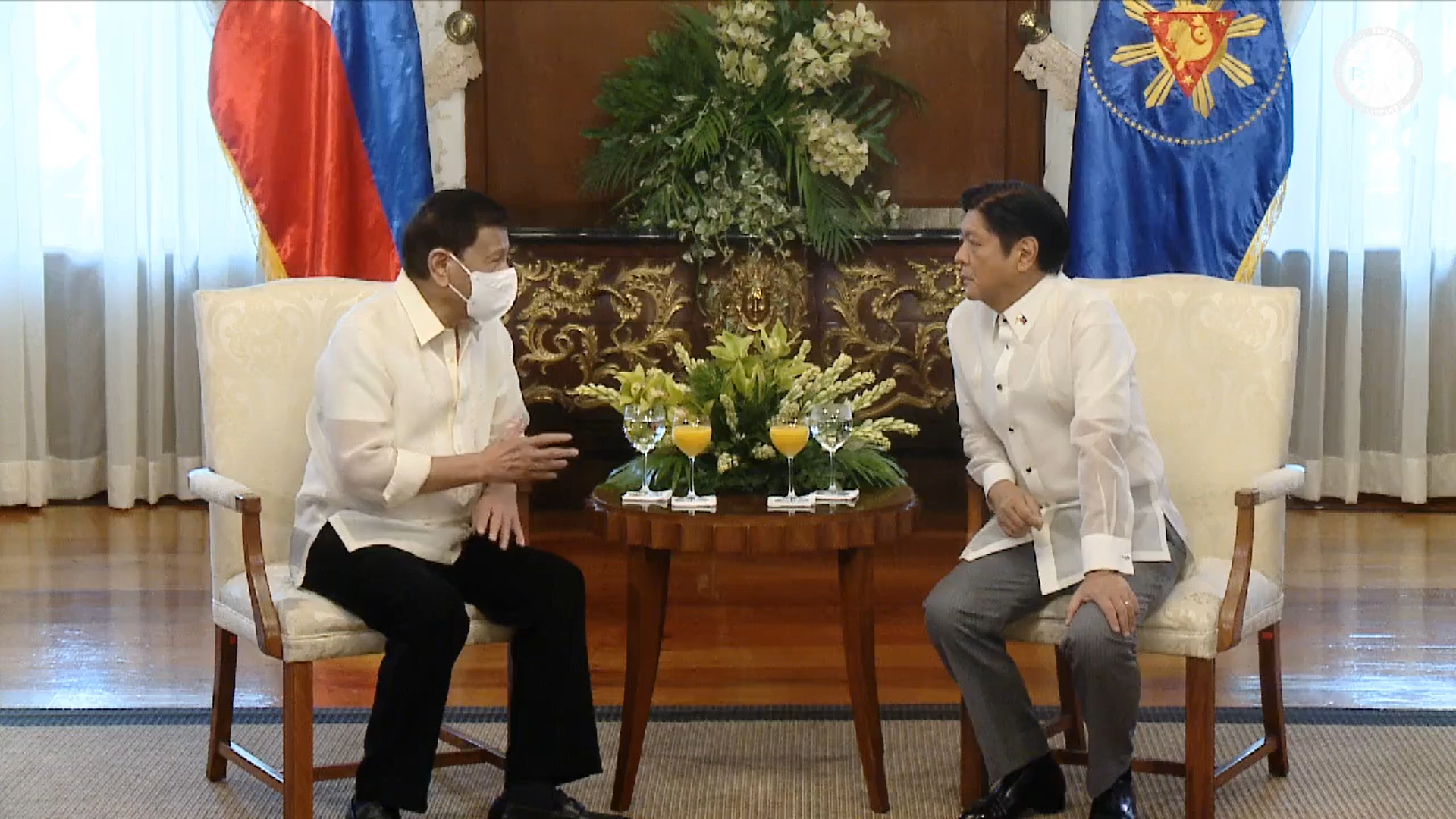
- Outgoing president Rodrigo Duterte (left) and president-elect Bongbong Marcos (right) meet at the President's Hall of Malacañang Palace, June 30, 2022.
- Formation: May 12, 2022; 4 years ago
- Dissolved: June 30, 2022; 4 years ago
- Outgoing President of the Philippines: Rodrigo Duterte
- President-elect of the Philippines: Bongbong Marcos

The presidential transition of Bongbong Marcos started when former senator Bongbong Marcos won the Philippine presidential election on May 9, 2022. Marcos topped the official count by the Congress of the Philippines with 31,629,783 votes. The joint bicameral Congress proclaimed Marcos as the president-elect and Sara Duterte as the vice president-elect on May 25, 2022. The transition lasted until the day of the president-elect's inauguration on June 30, 2022.

== Timeline ==
=== Pre-election ===
- May 5: Outgoing president Rodrigo Duterte names the chairperson of his transition committee.
- May 9: Election Day; Marcos leads the initial unofficial count in the Commission on Elections (COMELEC) transparency server.

=== Post-election ===
- May 10:
  - Outgoing president Duterte creates his Presidential Transition Committee (PTC).
  - Initial transition talks between the teams of the outgoing and incoming president begin.
  - The COMELEC en banc reaffirms the junking of Marcos's disqualification cases, which were all previously denied before the election.
- May 12: Marcos assumes victory and begins forming his transition committee.
- May 13: Marcos makes the UniTeam transition team public.
- May 25: Marcos, along with his running mate Sara Duterte, are officially proclaimed by the joint bicameral Congress as the president-elect and vice president-elect.
- May 17 and 18: Marcos's disqualification cases are elevated to the Supreme Court after being junked by the COMELEC en banc.
- June 28: The Supreme Court denies Marcos's disqualification cases, clearing the last legal hurdle to Marcos's candidacy.
- June 30: Inauguration Day

== Organization of the transition ==
=== Marcos's transition committee ===
Marcos began forming his transition committee on May 12, 2022, even before his proclamation. By the time his team was being organized, he led the unofficial count in the Commission on Elections transparency server. The members of his team were named on May 13, 2022.

UniTeam transition team
Position	Name
Chairperson	Victor Rodriguez
Members	Antonio Lagdameo Jr.
Members	Benjamin Abalos Jr.
Members	Zenaida Angping
Members	Reynaldo Tamayo Jr.

=== Duterte's transition committee ===
On May 5, 2022, before the start of the elections, incumbent president Rodrigo Duterte named the chairperson of his transition team. Duterte later issued Administrative Order No. 47 on May 10, 2022 creating the Presidential Transition Committee (PTC) "to ensure a peaceful, orderly and smooth transfer of powers to the next duly elected president.

Presidential Transition Committee (PTC) of President Rodrigo Duterte
Position	Name
Chairperson	Salvador Medialdea (Executive Secretary)
Members	Teodoro Locsin Jr. (Secretary of Foreign Affairs)
Members	Carlos Dominguez III (Secretary of Finance)
Members	Tina Rose Marie Canda (Secretary of Budget and Management)
Members	Karl Kendrick Chua (Director-General of the National Economic and Development Authority)

== Cabinet appointments ==
Marcos began naming the members of his cabinet on May 12, 2022. According to Marcos's spokesperson, his main requirements for selecting members of his cabinet are competence, qualification, love for country, and respect for the constitution.

Title	Name	Ref.
President	Bongbong Marcos	
Vice President	Sara Duterte	
Cabinet Secretary	Unnamed (abolished)	
Executive Secretary	Victor Rodriguez	
Press Secretary	Trixie Cruz-Angeles	
Presidential Spokesperson	Unnamed (abolished)	
Secretary of Agrarian Reform	Conrado Estrella III	
Secretary of Agriculture	Bongbong Marcos	
Secretary of Budget and Management	Amenah Pangandaman	
Secretary of Education	Sara Duterte	
Secretary of Energy	Raphael Lotilla	
Secretary of Environment and Natural Resources	Ma. Antonia Yulo-Loyzaga	
Secretary of Finance	Benjamin Diokno	
Secretary of Foreign Affairs	Enrique Manalo	
Secretary of Health	Maria Rosario Vergeire (OIC)	
Secretary of Human Settlements and Urban Development	Jose Acuzar	
Secretary of Information and Communications Technology	Ivan John Uy	
Secretary of the Interior and Local Government	Benjamin Abalos Jr.	
Secretary of Justice	Jesus Crispin Remulla	
Secretary of Labor and Employment	Bienvenido Laguesma	
Secretary of Migrant Workers	Susan Ople	
Secretary of National Defense	Jose Faustino Jr. (OIC and Senior Undersecretary)	
Secretary of Public Works and Highways	Manuel Bonoan	
Secretary of Science and Technology	Renato Solidum Jr.	
Secretary of Social Welfare and Development	Erwin Tulfo	
Secretary of Tourism	Christina Frasco	
Secretary of Trade and Industry	Alfredo E. Pascual	
Secretary of Transportation	Jaime Bautista	
Special Assistant to the President	Antonio Lagdameo Jr.	

=== Other officials ===
Title	Name	Ref.
Chairman of the Civil Service Commission	Karlo Nograles	
Chairman of the Commission on Audit	Jose Calida	
Chairman of the Commission on Elections	George Erwin Garcia	
Chairman and Resident Representative of the Manila Economic and Cultural Office	Silvestre Bello III	
Chairperson of the Land Transportation Franchising and Regulatory Board	Cheloy V. Garafil	
Commissioner of the Bureau of Internal Revenue	Lilia Guillermo	
Director-General of the National Economic and Development Authority	Arsenio Balisacan	
Director-General of the National Intelligence Coordinating Agency	Ricardo de Leon	
General Manager of the Philippine Ports Authority	Christopher Pastrana	
National Security Adviser	Clarita Carlos	
President and General Manager of the Government Service Insurance System	Jose Arnulfo Veloso	
Presidential Legal Counsel	Juan Ponce Enrile	
Secretary of the Presidential Management Staff	Zenaida Angping	
Solicitor General	Menardo Guevarra	
