= 2010 Batangas local elections =

Part of 2010 general election

2010 Batangas gubernatorial election
← 2007	May 10, 2010	2013 →
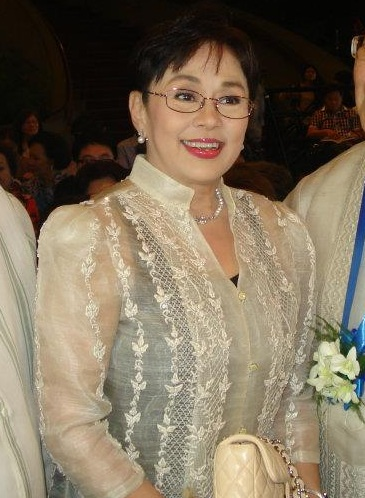
		NP
Nominee	Vilma Santos-Recto	Edna Sanchez
Party	Liberal	Nacionalista
Running mate	Jose Antonio Leviste II	Edwin Ermita
Popular vote	603,159	393,586
Percentage	59.63	38.91
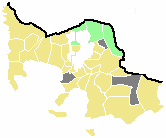
- Vilma Santos Won:28 Municipalities Edna Sanchez Won:3 Municipalities Others Won:3 Municipalities
Governor before election
Vilma Santos-Recto
Liberal
Elected Governor
Vilma Santos-Recto
Liberal

Local elections was held in the province of Batangas on May 10, 2010, as part of the 2010 general election. Voters will select candidates for all local positions: a town mayor, vice mayor and town councilors, as well as members of the Sangguniang Panlalawigan, the vice-governor, governor and representatives for the four districts of Batangas. The list below are the candidates as of May 2010.

== Gubernatorial election ==
Vilma Santos Recto was the incumbent. Her opponent was former Governor Armondo Sanchez. Sanchez suffered a stroke due to fatigue while campaigning and died on April 27. His wife, Santo Tomas Mayor Edna Sanchez, was his substitute.

- Batangas gubernatorial election
  Party	Candidate	Votes	%
  Liberal	Vilma Santos-Recto	603,159	59.63
  Nacionalista	Edna Sanchez^{[A]}	393,586	38.91
  Independent	Marcos Mandanas, Sr.	13,007	1.29
  Independent	Gaudioso Platero	1,760	0.17
  Total votes		1,071,219	100.00
  Liberal hold			
- Batangas vice-gubernatorial election
  Party	Candidate	Votes	%
  Liberal	Jose Antonio Leviste II	668,744	71.60
  Lakas–Kampi	Edwin Ermita^{[B]}	265,243	28.40
  Total votes		1,071,219	100.00
  Liberal hold			

Notes

- A Arman Sanchez died of hypertension on April 27, 2010. His wife, incumbent Santo Tomas mayor Edna Sanchez, was named as his substitute.
- B Ermita is Sanchez's guest candidate.

== Congressional elections ==
Each of Batangas's four legislative districts will elect each representative to the House of Representatives.

=== 1st District ===
Incumbent Eileen Ermita-Buhain is in her third consecutive term and is ineligible to run; her father Eduardo is her party's nominee for the seat.

Eduardo Ermita placed the result of the election under protest in the House of Representatives Electoral Tribunal.

Philippine House of Representatives election at Batangas' 1st district
Party	Candidate	Votes	%
Liberal	Tomas Apacible	124,196	54.83
Lakas–Kampi	Eduardo Ermita	102,890	45.17
Valid ballots		227,806	91.71
Invalid or blank votes		20,600	8.29
Total votes		248,406	100.00%
Liberal gain from Lakas–Kampi			

=== 2nd District ===
Hermilando Mandanas is the incumbent.

Philippine House of Representatives election at Batangas' 2nd district
Party	Candidate	Votes	%
Liberal	Hermilando Mandanas	155,516	63.32
Lakas–Kampi	Godofredo Berberbe	90,074	36.78
Valid ballots		245,590	92.76
Invalid or blank votes		11,147	4.34
Total votes		256,737	100.00%
Liberal hold			

=== 3rd District ===
Victoria Hernandez-Reyes is in her third consecutive term and is ineligible to run; her husband Rodrigo is her party's nominee for the seat.

The result of the election is under protest in the House of Representatives Electoral Tribunal.

Philippine House of Representatives election at Batangas' 3rd district
Party	Candidate	Votes	%
PMP	Nelson Collantes	67,238	27.19
Liberal	Cristeta Reyes	60,375	24.42
NPC	Ma. Chona Dimayuga	52,387	21.19
Nacionalista	Luis Carlos Laurel	36,023	14.57
Lakas–Kampi	Rodrigo Reyes	22,457	9.08
LM	Nicomedes Hernandez	8,790	3.55
Valid ballots		247,270	92.76
Invalid or blank votes		19,288	7.24
Total votes		266,558	100.00%
PMP gain from Lakas–Kampi			

=== 4th District ===
Mark L. Mendoza is the incumbent.

Philippine House of Representatives election at Batangas' 4th district
Party	Candidate	Votes	%
NPC	Mark L. Mendoza	248,891	94.60
PMP	Praxedes Bustamante	14,179	5.40
Valid ballots		262,670	87.70
Invalid or blank votes		36,848	12.30
Total votes		299,518	100.00%
NPC hold			

== Sangguniang Panlalawigan elections ==
All 4 Districts of Batangas will elect Sangguniang Panlalawigan or provincial board members.

=== Summary ===
Party	Votes	%	Seats
Liberal Party	606,447	33.12	5
Lakas Kampi CMD	508,537	27.77	4
Nacionalista Party	414,040	22.61	1
Nationalist People's Coalition	202,882	11.08	0
PDP–Laban	36,695	2.00	0
Independent	62,337	3.40	0
Ex officio seats			3
Total	1,830,938	100.00	13
Total votes	1,071,219	–	

=== 1st District ===
- Municipality: Balayan, Calaca, Calatagan, Lemery, Lian, Catigbian, Taal, Tuy, Nasugbu
- Population (2007): 522,607

Parties are as stated in their certificate of candidacies.

Batangas 1st District Sangguniang Panlalawigan election
Party	Candidate	Votes	%
Liberal	Lorenzo Bausas	94,274	27.58
Lakas–Kampi	Roman Rosales	75,642	22.13
Nacionalista	Rodolfo Salanguit	65,035	19.02
Liberal	Alexander Bonuan	56,947	16.66
Lakas–Kampi	Arnel Salas	34,467	10.08
Independent	Horacio Alvarez	15,488	4.53
Total votes		248,406	100.00

=== 2nd District ===
- City: Batangas City
- Municipality: Bauan, Lobo, Mabini, San Luis, San Pascual, Tuy
- Population (2007): 558,882

Parties are as stated in their certificate of candidacies.

Batangas 2nd District Sangguniang Panlalawigan election
Party	Candidate	Votes	%
Liberal	Christopher De Leon	149,231	29.29
Lakas–Kampi	Joel Atienza	119,197	23.39
Lakas–Kampi	Florencio De Loyola	94,536	18.55
Lakas–Kampi	Manuel Aclan	78,068	15.32
Nacionalista	Julian Villena	68,486	13.44
Total votes		256,737	100.00

=== 3rd District ===
- City: Tanauan City
- Municipality: Agoncillo, Alitagtag, Balete, Cuenca, Laurel, Malvar, Mataas na Kahoy, San Nicolas, Santa Teresita, Santo Tomas, Talisay
- Population (2007): 537,399

Parties are as stated in their certificate of candidacies

Batangas 3rd District Sangguniang Panlalawigan election
Party	Candidate	Votes	%
Lakas–Kampi	Alfredo Corona	106,627	30.48
Liberal	Divina Balba	90,405	25.84
Nacionalista	Simeon Platon	83,190	23.78
Independent	Arturo Malijan	43,317	12.38
NPC	Edgar Runes	22,767	6.51
Independent	Ferdinand Topacio	3,532	1.01
Total votes		266,558	100.00

=== 4th District ===
- City: Lipa City
- Municipality: Ibaan, Padre Garcia, Rosario, San Jose, San Juan, Taysan
- Population (2007): 626,981

Parties are as stated in their certificate of candidacies

Batangas 4th District Sangguniang Panlalawigan election
Party	Candidate	Votes	%
Liberal	Mabelle Virtusio	108,223	17.08
Liberal	Caloy Bolilia	107,367	16.94
Nacionalista	Rowena Africa	100,473	15.85
NPC	Aries Emmanuel Mendoza	100,308	15.83
Nacionalista	Federico Caisip	81,037	12.79
NPC	Leonilo Catipon	79,807	12.59
PDP–Laban	Abelardo Adaya	36,695	5.79
Nacionalista	Robert Asa	19,819	3.13
Total votes		299,518	100.00

== Mayoralty elections ==
All municipalities of Batangas, Batangas City, Lipa City and Tanauan City will elect mayor and vice-mayor this election. The candidates for mayor and vice mayor with the highest number of votes wins the seat; they are voted separately, therefore, they may be of different parties when elected. Below is the list of mayoralty candidates of each city and municipalities per district.

=== 1st District, Candidates for Mayor ===
- Municipality: Balayan, Calaca, Calatagan, Lemery, Lian, Nasugbu, Taal, Tuy

==== Balayan ====
Balayan mayoralty election
Party	Candidate	Votes	%
Lakas–Kampi	Emmanuel Fronda	22,983	65.56
Independent	Yolanda Magundayao	12,076	34.44
Total votes		36,133	100.00
Lakas–Kampi hold			

==== Calaca ====
Calaca mayoralty election
Party	Candidate	Votes	%
Lakas–Kampi	Sofronio Ona, Jr.	21,501	62.40
Liberal	Marlon Hernandez	12,957	37.60
Total votes		35,073	100.00
Lakas–Kampi hold			

==== Calatagan ====
Calatagan
Party	Candidate	Votes	%
Lakas–Kampi	Sophia Palacio	13,152	62.97
Independent	Ramiro Palacio	7,758	37.10
Total votes		22,097	100.00
Lakas–Kampi hold			

==== Lemery ====
Lemery mayoralty election
Party	Candidate	Votes	%
Lakas–Kampi	Eulalio Alilio	24,024	61.69
Liberal	Geraldine Ornales	14,920	38.31
Total votes		39,590	100.00
Lakas–Kampi hold			

==== Lian ====
Lian mayoralty election
Party	Candidate	Votes	%
Nacionalista	Osita Vergara	14,452	68.97
Lakas–Kampi	Cesar Lagus	6,503	31.03
Total votes		21,979	100.00
Nacionalista hold			

==== Nasugbu ====
Nasugbu mayoralty election
Party	Candidate	Votes	%
Lakas–Kampi	Jr Angel GB	28,489	62.92
Liberal	Jacinto Bautista	16,644	36.76
Independent	Erodante Bicomong	143	0.32
Total votes		47,787	100.00
Lakas–Kampi hold			

==== Taal ====
Taal mayoralty election
Party	Candidate	Votes	%
Liberal	Michael Montenegro	13,454	53.28
Lakas–Kampi	Jovito Albufera	11,140	44.12
Aksyon	Eduardo Bautista	468	1.85
Nacionalista	Aida Villamin	190	0.75
Total votes		25,661	100.00
Liberal hold			

==== Tuy ====
Tuy
Party	Candidate	Votes	%
Lakas–Kampi	Jose Jecerell Cerrado	11,760	60.71
Liberal	Rosario Abiad	7,612	39.29
Total votes		20,086	100.00
Lakas–Kampi hold			

=== 2nd District, Candidates for Mayor ===
- City: Batangas City
- Municipality: Bauan, Lobo, Mabini, San Luis, San Pascual, Tingloy

==== Batangas City ====
Batangas City mayoralty election
Party	Candidate	Votes	%
Lakas–Kampi	Vilma Dimacuha	67,557	54.16
Nacionalista	Emilio Berberabe, Jr.	56,596	45.37
PMP	Casiano Ebora	592	0.47
Total votes		128,127	100.00
Lakas–Kampi hold			

==== Bauan ====
Bauan mayoralty election
Party	Candidate	Votes	%
Liberal	Ryanh Dolor	23,636	63.27
Nacionalista	Agripino Bautista	13,724	36.73
Total votes		38,318	100.00
Liberal hold			

==== Lobo ====
Lobo mayoralty election
Party	Candidate	Votes	%
Nacionalista	Efren Diona	9,263	51.24
Liberal	Virgilio Manalo	8,814	48.76
Total votes		18,420	100.00
Nacionalista gain from Liberal			

==== Mabini ====
Mabini
Party	Candidate	Votes	%
Lakas–Kampi	Nilo Villanueva	14,329	67.41
Liberal	Julsie Schmid	6,928	32.59
Total votes		21,646	100.00
Lakas–Kampi hold			

==== San Luis ====
<

San Luis mayoralty election Partial Unofficial Tally as of 2010-05-11 17:07:12
Party	Candidate	Votes	%
Nacionalista	Rodolfo Mendoza	9,197	
Liberal	Samuel Noel Ocampo	6,576	

==== San Pascual ====
San Pascual mayoralty election
Party	Candidate	Votes	%
Lakas–Kampi	Antonio Dimayuga	16,847	65.92
Independent	Rosario Anna Conti	8,710	34.08
Total votes		21,979	100.00
Lakas–Kampi hold			

==== Tingloy ====
Tingloy
Party	Candidate	Votes	%
Lakas–Kampi	Lauro Alvarez	6,298	78.62
Nacionalista	Antonio Atienza	1,713	21.38
Total votes		8,159	100.00
Lakas–Kampi hold			

=== 3rd District, Candidates for Mayor ===
- City: Tanauan City
- Municipality: Agoncillo, Alitagtag, Balete, Cuenca, Laurel, Malvar, Mataas na Kahoy, Batangas, San Nicolas, Santa Teresita, Santo Tomas, Talisay

==== Tanauan City ====
<

Tanauan City mayoralty election Partial Unofficial Tally as of 2010-05-11 17:07:12
Party	Candidate	Votes	%
Liberal	Sonia Aquino (incumbent)	44,015	69.86
Lakas–Kampi	Victoria Reyes	18,986	30.14
Liberal hold			

==== Agoncillo ====
<

Agoncillo mayoralty election Partial Unofficial Tally as of 2010-05-11 17:07:12
Party	Candidate	Votes	%
Nacionalista	Julian Humarang	15,762	56%
Lakas–Kampi	Glorioso Martinez (incumbent)	8,979	44%

==== Alitagtag ====
<

Alitagtag mayoralty election Partial Unofficial Tally as of 2010-05-11 17:07:12
Party	Candidate	Votes	%
Nacionalista	Anthony Francis Andal	3,146	
Liberal	Florante Palines	3,127	
Independent	Bernardo Reyes	2,166	
NPC	Noriel Salazar, Sr.	2,139	

==== Balete ====
<

Balete mayoralty election Partial Unofficial Tally as of 2010-05-11 17:07:12
Party	Candidate	Votes	%
NPC	Leovino Hidalgo	3,509	
Liberal	Ludivina Pamplona	2,486	
Lakas–Kampi	Marissa Reyes (incumbent)	2,441	

==== Cuenca ====
<

Cuenca mayoralty election Partial Unofficial Tally as of 2010-05-11 17:07:12
Party	Candidate	Votes	%
Liberal	Celerino Endaya (incumbent)	7,876	
Nacionalista	Edmundo Remo	7,971	

==== Laurel ====
Nacionalista hold <

Laurel mayoralty election Partial Unofficial Tally as of 2010-05-11 17:07:12
Party	Candidate	Votes	%
Liberal	Randy James Amo	5,993	
Nacionalista	John Benedict Panganiban (incumbent)	5,495	
PMP	Celso Aristotle Parrilla	3,143	

==== Malvar ====
Incumbent Cristeta Reyes is term-limited and is running for district representative. Her brother-in-law, Carlito Reyes is her party's nominee. His opponent is incumbent vice mayor Simeon Magpantay.

<

Malvar mayoralty election Partial Unofficial Tally as of 2010-05-11 17:07:12
Party	Candidate	Votes	%
Lakas–Kampi	Simeon Magpantay	5,448	
Liberal	Carlito Reyes	10,520	

==== Mataas na Kahoy ====
<

Mataas na Kahoy mayoralty election Partial Unofficial Tally as of 2010-05-11 17:07:12
Party	Candidate	Votes	%
Lakas–Kampi	Calixto Luna, Jr.	5,931	
Nacionalista	Danilo Sombrano (incumbent)	6,569	

==== San Nicolas ====
<

San Nicolas mayoralty election Partial Unofficial Tally as of 2010-05-11 17:07:12
Party	Candidate	Votes	%
Nacionalista	Napoleon Arceo	2,585	
Independent	William Enriquez	1,292	
Lakas–Kampi	Epifanio Sandoval (incumbent)	3,826	

==== Santa Teresita ====
<

Santa Teresita mayoralty election Partial Unofficial Tally as of 2010-05-11 17:07:12
Party	Candidate	Votes	%
Lakas–Kampi	Anna Marie Mendoza (incumbent)	3,566	
Liberal	Ma. Aurea Segunial	4,998	

==== Santo Tomas ====
<

Santo Tomas mayoralty election Partial Unofficial Tally as of 2010-05-11 17:07:12
Party	Candidate	Votes	%
Nacionalista	Edna Sanchez^{[A]}	95,000	
Liberal	Osmundo Maligaya	10,000	

Notes

- A Renato Federico substituted Edna Sanchez, who was named as the substitute gubernatorial candidate to her husband Arman Sanchez who died on April 27, 2010.

==== Talisay ====
<

Talisay mayoralty election Partial Unofficial Tally as of 2010-05-11 17:07:12
Party	Candidate	Votes	%
Nacionalista	Luis Malabanan	8,650	
Liberal	Zenaida Mendoza	8,332	
Lakas–Kampi	Florencio Pesigan	744	

=== 4th District, Candidates for Mayor ===
- City: Lipa City
- Municipality: Ibaan, Padre Garcia, Rosario, San Jose, San Juan, Taysan

==== Lipa City ====
<

Lipa City mayoralty election Partial Unofficial Tally as of 2010-05-11 17:07:12
Party	Candidate	Votes	%
Nacionalista	Meynardo Sabili	55,268	53.10
Lakas–Kampi	Oscar Gozos (incumbent)	48,815	46.90
Nacionalista gain from Lakas–Kampi			

==== Ibaan ====
<

Ibaan mayoralty election Partial Unofficial Tally as of 2010-05-11 17:07:12
Party	Candidate	Votes	%
NPC	Remegio Hernandez (incumbent)	10,593	
Lakas–Kampi	Cesar Marasigan	1,683	
Liberal	Juan Toreja	13,041	

==== Padre Garcia ====
<

Padre Garcia mayoralty election Partial Unofficial Tally as of 2010-05-11 17:07:12
Party	Candidate	Votes	%
NPC	Prudencio Gutierrez (incumbent)	10,812	
Liberal	Nestor Recto	8,581	

==== Rosario ====
<

Rosario mayoralty election Partial Unofficial Tally as of 2010-05-11 17:07:12
Party	Candidate	Votes	%
Lakas–Kampi	Danilo Alday	6,536	
PMP	Leonardo Anyayahan	3,629	
PDP–Laban	Pio Jay Calingasan	1,590	
Liberal	Felipe Marquez (incumbent)	22,095	
Nacionalista	Rodolfo Villar	9,688	

==== San Jose ====
<

San Jose mayoralty election Partial Unofficial Tally as of 2010-05-11 17:07:12
Party	Candidate	Votes	%
Liberal	Entiquio Briones	17,740	
NPC	Valentino Patron	16,222	

==== San Juan ====
San Juan mayoralty election Partial Unofficial Tally as of 2010-05-11 17:07:12
Party	Candidate	Votes	%
Liberal	Rodolfo Manalo	21,546	
NPC	Danilo Mindanao (incumbent)	17,337	

==== Taysan ====
<

Taysan mayoralty election Partial Unofficial Tally as of 2010-05-11 17:07:12
Party	Candidate	Votes	%
Liberal	Edilberto Abaday	6,696	
NPC	Victor Portugal, Jr. (incumbent)	9,888	
