= Tomas Apacible =

Former representative from the 1st district of Batangas

Tomas V. Apacible
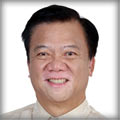
- Official portrait, 2010

Member of the Philippine House of Representatives from Batangas's 1st District
- In office June 30, 2010 – June 30, 2013
- Preceded by: Eileen Ermita-Buhain
- Succeeded by: Eileen Ermita-Buhain

Commissioner of the Bureau of Customs
- In office 1991–1992
- President: Corazon Aquino
- Preceded by: Salvador Mison
- Succeeded by: Guillermo Parayno, Jr.

Personal details
- Born: March 7, 1946 (age 80) Commonwealth of the Philippines
- Party: Liberal
- Spouse: Maria Dolores Cacdac
- Education: San Beda College

Tomas Villadolid Apacible is a Filipino politician who last served as representative of the 1st district in the province of Batangas in the Philippine House of Representatives from 2010 to 2013. He defeated former Congressman and Executive Secretary Eduardo Ermita in the 2010 elections, but lost his re-election bid in 2013 to his predecessor and Ermita's daughter, Eileen Ermita-Buhain. He is also a former Commissioner of the Bureau of Customs, Senior Undersecretary of the Department of Finance, Senior Governor of the Development Bank of The Philippines and Private Sector Representative to the Land Bank of the Philippines Board of Directors.

As representative, he sat as Senior Vice Chairman of the Committee of Trade and Industry and Southern Tagalog Regional Development. He was also a member of the following committees: Ways and Means, Agriculture and Food, Energy, Tourism, Public Works and Highways, Information, Communication and Technology, Public Order and Safety, and Banks and Financial Intermediaries.

Apacible is the son of former Batangas 1st district representative Apolinario Apacible and Remedios Villadolid and the brother of former Nasugbu mayor and Batangas 1st district representative Conrado Apacible. He is married to Maria Dolores Cacdac with whom he has three children: Alyanna, Tomas II, and Airene.

Government offices
Preceded by Salvador Mison	Commissioner of the Bureau of Customs; 1991–1992	Succeeded by Guillermo Parayno Jr.
House of Representatives of the Philippines
Preceded by Eileen Ermita-Buhain	Representative, 1st District of Batangas; 2010–2013	Succeeded by Eileen Ermita-Buhain
