= Renato de Villa =

Filipino former police and military officer and government official

Renato S. de Villa
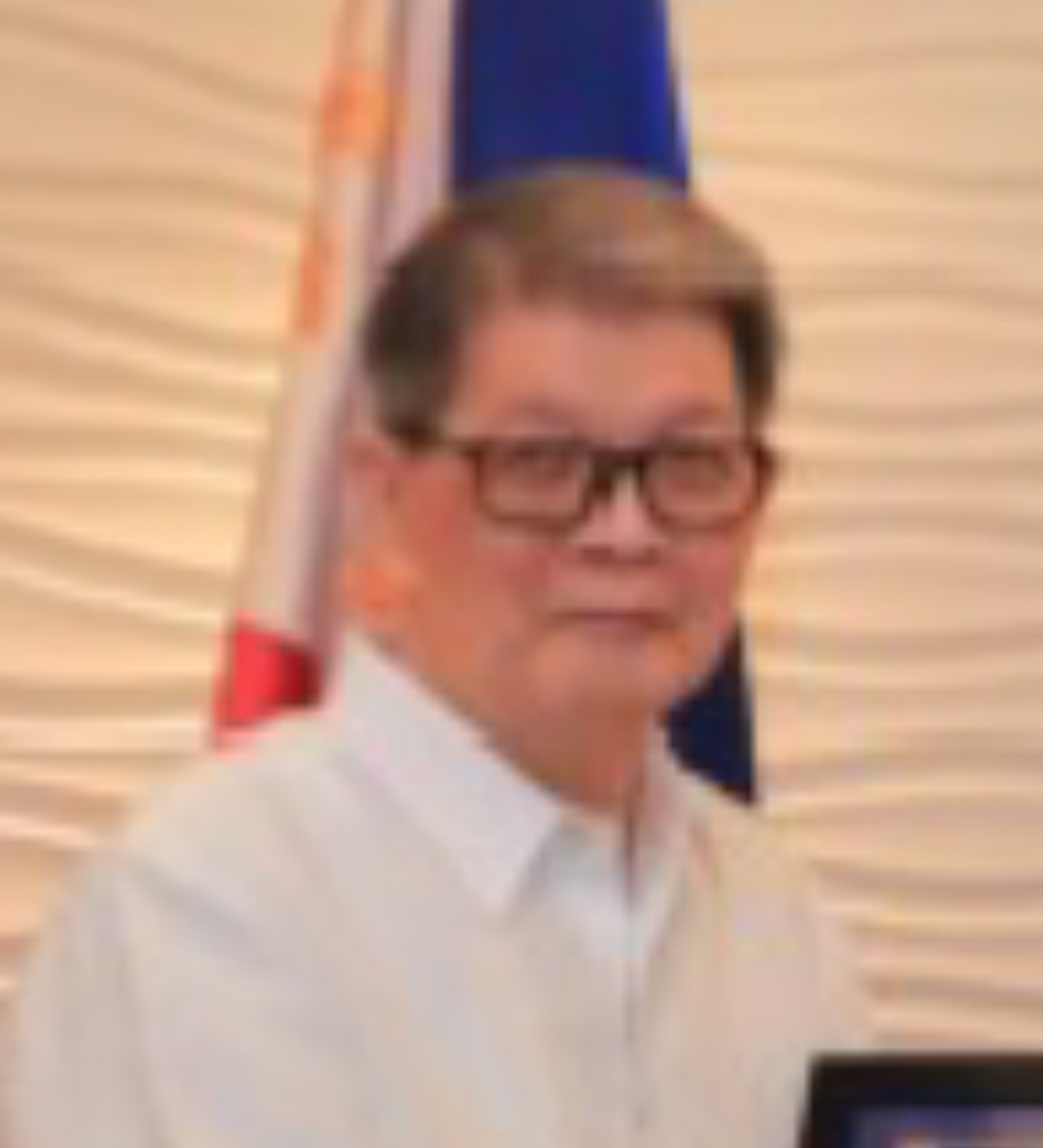

33rd Executive Secretary of the Philippines
- In office January 20, 2001 – May 7, 2001
- President: Gloria Macapagal-Arroyo
- Preceded by: Edgardo Angara
- Succeeded by: Alberto Romulo

18th Secretary of National Defense
- In office July 20, 1991 – September 15, 1997
- President: Fidel Ramos; Corazon Aquino
- Preceded by: Fidel Ramos
- Succeeded by: Fortunato Abat

20th Chief of Staff of the Armed Forces of the Philippines
- In office 1988–1991
- President: Corazon Aquino
- Preceded by: Fidel Ramos
- Succeeded by: Rodolfo Biazon

Vice-Chief of Staff of the Armed Forces of the Philippines
- In office 1987–1988
- President: Corazon Cojuangco-Aquino
- Preceded by: Salvador Mison
- Succeeded by: Eduardo Ermita

Chief of the Philippine Constabulary
- Director General of the Integrated National Police
- In office 1986–1988
- AFP Chief of Staff: Gen. Fidel Ramos
- Preceded by: Fidel V. Ramos
- Succeeded by: Ramon Montaño

Personal details
- Born: July 20, 1935 (age 91) San Juan, Batangas, Philippine Islands
- Party: Reporma (1997–present)
- Other political affiliations: Lakas (1997)
- Spouse: Monica Barrica
- Children: 4
- Education: Philippine Military Academy; Asian Institute of Management (MBM)
- Police career
- Service: Philippine Constabulary
- Service years: 1951–1991
- Rank: General

Renato "Rene" Salud de Villa (born July 20, 1935) is a Filipino former police and military officer and government official. He served as Chief of Philippine Constabulary, Director-General of the Integrated National Police, and Chief of Staff of the Armed Forces of the Philippines. He then served as Secretary of National Defense under presidents Corazon Aquino and Fidel V. Ramos. He founded Partido para sa Demokratikong Reporma for his unsuccessful presidential bid in 1998. He then briefly served as Executive Secretary under President Gloria Macapagal Arroyo.

== Early life and education ==
Renato de Villa was born on July 20, 1935, in San Juan, Batangas. He completed his elementary education at San Juan Elementary School, and finished high school at Batangas Eastern Academy, also in San Juan. He studied engineering for one year at the University of Santo Tomas in Manila before taking and passing the entrance exam for the Philippine Military Academy.

De Villa has a master's degree in Business Management from the Asian Institute of Management.

== Career ==
=== Armed Forces of the Philippines ===
De Villa served as Chief of Philippine Constabulary and Director-General of the Integrated National Police in 1986 and was concurrent Vice-Chief of Staff of the Armed Forces of the Philippines in 1987. In 1988, he was promoted to Chief of Staff of the Armed Forces by President Corazon Aquino. In 1989, he defended President Corazon Aquino against coup plots in Manila by Gregorio Honasan's Reform the Armed Forces Movement (RAM) and the siege of an army camp by Rizal Alih in Zamboanga City.

=== Awards in military service ===
- Presidential Medal of Merit (Philippines)
- Outstanding Achievement Medal
- Visayas Anti-Dissidence Campaign Medal
- Mindanao Anti-dissidence Campaign Medal
- Long Service Medal
- Disaster Relief & Rehabilitation Operation Ribbon
- Military Commendation Medal

=== Secretary of National Defense ===
In 1991, Fidel Ramos resigned as Defense secretary to run for president. Aquino appointed de Villa as his replacement. When Ramos won as president in 1992, he reappointed de Villa to the post.

=== 1998 presidential election ===
In 1997, he resigned as Defense secretary and made his bid for the presidency. He joined Lakas–NUCD the same year to get Ramos' endorsement. De Villa was widely believed to be the preferred candidate of President Fidel V. Ramos, due to their long association in the Philippine Constabulary, shared experience in the EDSA Revolution, and appointment as Secretary of National Defense. However, in December 1997, Ramos endorsed Lakas co-founder House Speaker Jose de Venecia, Jr., who became the official presidential nominee of the party.

De Villa bolted from the party and formed his own party called the Partido ng Demokratikong Reporma (Democratic Reform Party) and formed an alliance with the Lapiang Manggagawa (Labor Organization) as Reporma–LM. He chose Pangasinan Governor Oscar Orbos as his running mate and brought rebel members of Lakas to his party. Many criticized his actions, most of whom think that he basically cloned Ramos' career (Ramos did the same when he lost the nomination of the LDP). But in the election day of May, he lost to popular Vice President Joseph Estrada and placed sixth overall in a field of 11 candidates.

=== Executive Secretary ===
De Villa reappeared in 2001 when the second EDSA People Power Revolution escalated and influenced active officers of the Armed Forces to withdraw support to President Joseph Estrada. When President Gloria Macapagal Arroyo assumed office, she appointed de Villa as her executive secretary. He resigned from the cabinet the succeeding year citing health conditions. In the 2004 elections, he formally withdrew alliance with Arroyo and endorsed Raul Roco's campaign as president. His party did not fill any candidates other than what was endorsed by Roco. Roco however lost to the incumbent Arroyo in the elections.

In July 2005, De Villa was speculated to be picked as transition president in case the opposition successfully ousted President Arroyo and Vice President Noli de Castro from their positions and form a revolutionary government. Those plans did not happen when the Arroyo impeachment was dismissed in the Lakas-dominated House of Representatives.

== Personal life ==
As a young captain on the armed forces in the 1960s, De Villa would spend his leisure time at the Fort Bonifacio quarters of Eduardo Ermita, his classmate at the Philippine Military Academy. Also staying there was Monica "Monet" Barrica of Dipolog, a Philippine Airlines flight attendant and niece of Ermita's wife. De Villa married Barrica in 1968, a month before shipping out to Vietnam.

De Villa and Barrica had four children:

- Ma. Mercedes Josefina de Villa Colet
- Patrick Roland B. de Villa
- Katherine Johanna de Villa Maravilla - President of Batangas Eastern Colleges (2008―2020).
- Michael Celestino B. de Villa

Barrica was diagnosed with stage III malignant cancer in 1990, and died in September 2006 after a 16-year struggle. Her remains are buried in the Roman Catholic Cemetery in San Juan, Batangas.

== See also ==
- Department of National Defense (Philippines)
- Armed Forces of the Philippines
- Philippine Constabulary

Military offices
Preceded by Fidel Ramos	Chief of Staff of the Armed Forces of the Philippines	Succeeded by Rodolfo Biazon
Preceded by Salvador M. Mison	Vice Chief of Staff of the Armed Forces of the Philippines	Succeeded by Eduardo Ermita
Preceded by Fidel V. Ramos	Chief of Philippine Constabulary	Succeeded by Ramon Montaño
Political offices
Preceded by Edgardo Angara	Executive Secretary	Succeeded by Eduardo Ermita
Preceded by Fidel Ramos	Secretary of National Defense	Succeeded by Fortunato Abat
Party political offices
First	Reporma nominee for President of the Philippines	Vacant Title next held by Panfilo Lacson
