= Paquito Ochoa Jr. =

Filipino lawyer

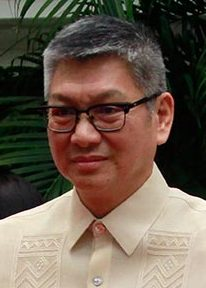
- Ochoa in June 2016

President of Manuel L. Quezon University
- Incumbent
- Assumed office November 1, 2020

37th Executive Secretary of the Philippines
- In office June 30, 2010 – June 30, 2016
- President: Benigno Aquino III
- Preceded by: Leandro Mendoza
- Succeeded by: Salvador Medialdea

Secretary of the Interior and Local Government Officer in Charge
- In office August 21, 2012 – August 31, 2012
- President: Benigno Aquino III
- Preceded by: Jesse Robredo
- Succeeded by: Mar Roxas

City Administrator of Quezon City
- In office 2003–2010
- Succeeded by: Dr. Victor B. Endriga

Personal details
- Born: Paquito Navarro Ochoa Jr. November 11, 1960 (age 65) Quezon City
- Spouse: Pinky Ochoa
- Education: Ateneo de Manila University; University of Santo Tomas
- Profession: Lawyer

Paquito "Jojo" Navarro Ochoa Jr. (born November 11, 1960) is a Filipino lawyer. He served as the 37th Executive Secretary of President Benigno Aquino III. He had been the city administrator of Quezon City from 2001 to 2010.

== Early life ==
Ochoa took his A.B. in economics at the University of Santo Tomas and law at the Ateneo de Manila University. He was admitted to the bar in 1986, and his pro-bono work in his province led to his election as Director and then Vice President of the Bulacan Chapter of the Integrated Bar of the Philippines. He also engaged in private practice and served as partner of the De Mesa and Ochoa law offices and later partner in the MOST (Marcos, Ochoa, Serapio & Tan) Law Firm, where subsequent First Lady Liza Araneta Marcos was previously a senior partner.

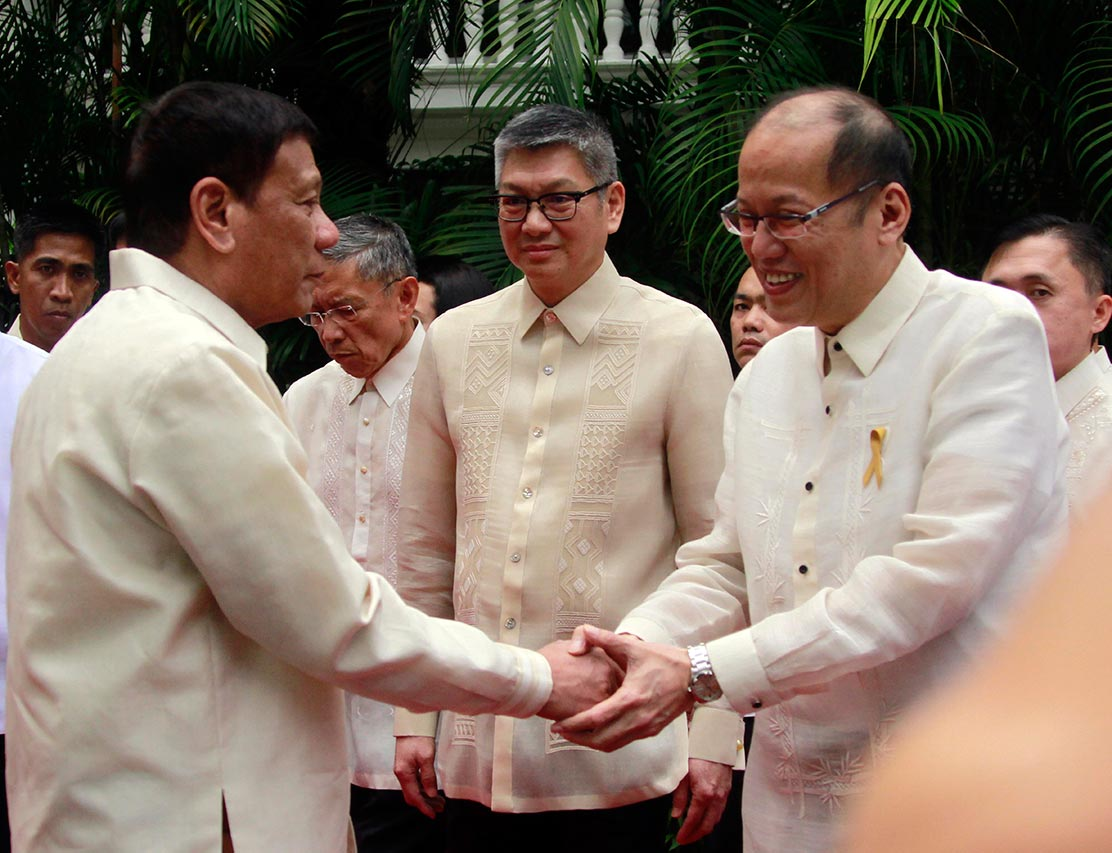
Ochoa, Jr. in 2016

The closeness of the Aquino and Ochoa families had its roots from the late Sen. Benigno "Ninoy" Aquino Jr. being a close friend of Paquito Ochoa Sr., who was then mayor of Pulilan, Bulacan. It would lead to Atty. Ochoa being tapped by President Benigno "Noynoy" Aquino III to handle the latter's legal requirements when he first ran for Congress in 1998; Atty. Ochoa handled his legal affairs since.

On May 13, 2024, Ochoa Jr. failed again to testify in the Philippine Senate Committee on Public Order and Dangerous Drugs inquiry on the alleged Philippine Drug Enforcement Agency leaked documents. The committee secretary received his letter with a medical certificate stating that he’s COVID-19 positive.

== City Administrator ==
In 2001, when then Rep. Feliciano "Sonny" Belmonte Jr. ran for mayor, Atty. Ochoa headed his legal team. Mayor Belmonte then made Atty. Ochoa his right-hand man and later formally appointed him city administrator in 2003.

As city administrator, he helped oversee the management of a city grappling with budget shortfalls and the increasing demands of a fast-growing city. Atty. Ochoa headed the Finance Committee, among others, and implemented systems that would drastically cut down unnecessary spending by the city government.

Prudent spending practices that included a thorough review of the infrastructure requirements of the city and the rationalization of its utilities expenditures—together with improved revenue collection—allowed Quezon City to successfully balance its budget and pay all the obligations of past administrations, including the P33 million in arrears in premium payments to the GSIS dating back to 1997. It also enabled Quezon City to become one of the local government units least dependent on internal revenue allotments (IRA), with the IRA accounting for only 24% of its total income—11% less than it was in 2001.

The city's fiscal discipline allowed Quezon City to—upon the recommendation of Atty. Ochoa—automatically release the share of Q.C. barangays in the real property tax collections of the city. To ensure that Barangay Chairmen would use their fiscal autonomy wisely, Atty. Ochoa tapped the University of the Philippines’ National College of Public Administration and Governance to train the Barangay officials in the proper disbursement of their funds.

His work as City Administrator has earned praise from governance specialists in the academe like Ateneo School of Government Dean Tony La Viña, who called Atty. Ochoa "an effective, efficient and innovative public servant," whose "programs intended to improve education, health and business permitting processes" have helped improve the delivery of basic services in Quezon City. Today Quezon City's health workers are trained to properly implement the Magna Carta of Health Workers; its teachers receive additional training that have helped increase the scores of students in the Quezon City public school system; and Quezon City residents can expect less red tape at city hall.

== Confirmation ==
Ochoa's appointment as Executive Secretary was confirmed by the Commission on Appointments last February 2, 2011.

Political offices
Preceded by Leandro Mendoza	Executive Secretary of the Philippines; 2010 – 2016	Succeeded by Salvador Medialdea
Preceded by Jesse Robredo	Secretary of the Interior and Local Government; Acting; 2012	Succeeded by Mar Roxas
