= Alberto Romulo =

Philippine politician and diplomat

The Honorable Alberto Romulo
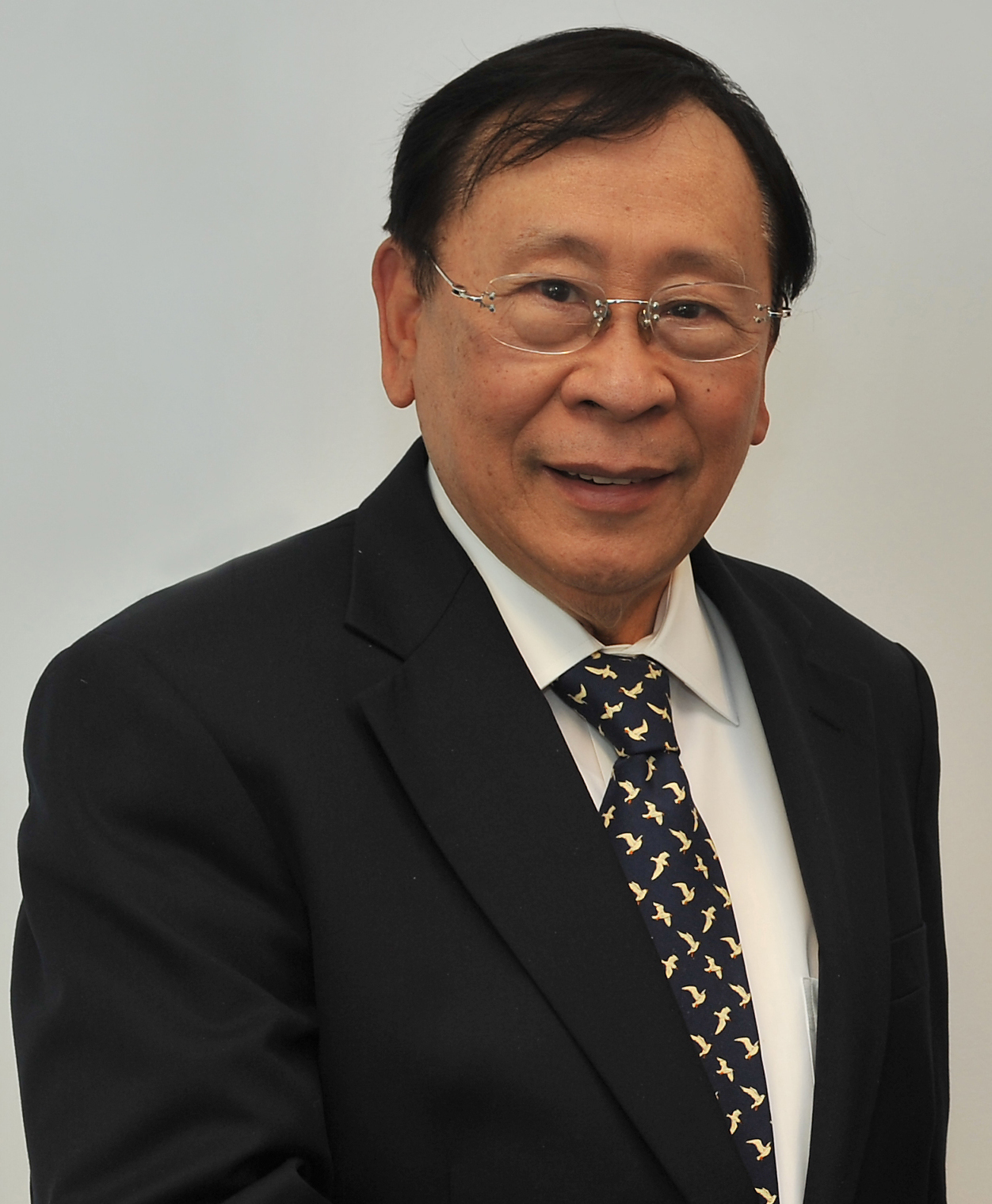
- Romulo in 2010

Chairman and Director of the Board of the Development Bank of the Philippines
- In office March 2017 – December 22, 2022
- Appointed by: Rodrigo Duterte
- President: Emmanuel G. Herbosa
- Succeeded by: Dante Tiñga

24th Secretary of Foreign Affairs
- In office August 23, 2004 – February 23, 2011
- President: Gloria Macapagal Arroyo; Benigno Aquino III
- Preceded by: Delia Albert
- Succeeded by: Albert del Rosario

34th Executive Secretary of the Philippines
- In office May 8, 2001 – August 23, 2004
- President: Gloria Macapagal Arroyo
- Preceded by: Renato de Villa
- Succeeded by: Eduardo Ermita

26th Secretary of Finance
- In office January 23 – June 30, 2001
- President: Gloria Macapagal Arroyo
- Preceded by: Jose Pardo
- Succeeded by: Jose Isidro Camacho

Senate Majority Leader
- In office July 22, 1991 – October 10, 1996
- Preceded by: Teofisto Guingona, Jr.
- Succeeded by: Francisco Tatad

Senator of the Philippines
- In office June 30, 1987 – June 30, 1998

Minister of Budget and Management
- In office February 25, 1986 – March 13, 1987
- President: Corazon Aquino
- Preceded by: Guillermo Carague
- Succeeded by: Manuel Alba (as Secretary)

Member of the Regular Batasang Pambansa
- In office June 30, 1984 – March 25, 1986 Serving with Ismael Mathay, Jr., Orlando Mercado, and Cecilia Muñoz-Palma
- Constituency: Quezon City

Personal details
- Born: Alberto Gatmaitan Romulo; August 7, 1933 (age 93) Camiling, Tarlac, Philippine Islands
- Party: LDP (1988–present)
- Other political affiliations: UNIDO (until 1987); LnB (1987–1988)
- Spouse: Rosie Lovely Tecson (m. 1963)
- Children: 5 (incl. Roman and Bernadette)
- Education: De La Salle University; Manuel L. Quezon University; University of Madrid
- Profession: Lawyer
- Website: Secretary of Foreign Affairs

Alberto "Bert" Gatmaitan Romulo (born August 7, 1933) is a Filipino politician and diplomat. He served in the Philippines in various capacities as executive secretary, finance secretary, foreign affairs secretary, and budget secretary. His most recent office is his leadership of the Department of Foreign Affairs before and during the early period of the administration of President Benigno Aquino III.

== Early years ==
Romulo was born in Camiling, Tarlac from Pangasinan and Kapampangan parents.

== Political career ==
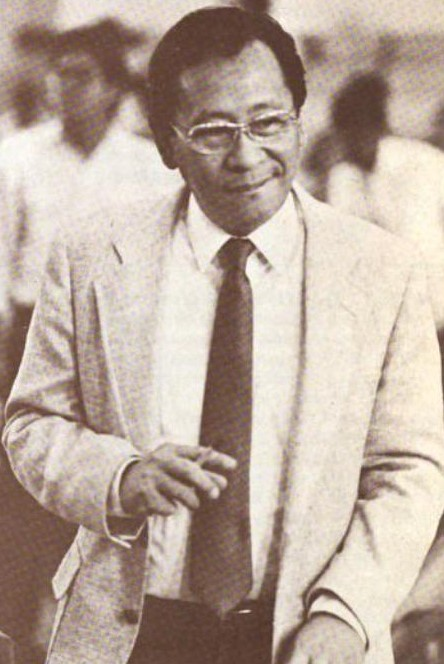
Romulo as a senator, photograph released by the Philippine Congress, c. 1988

He was then elected as member of the Regular Batasang Pambansa representing Quezon City in 1984. He then joined government service as the interim Minister of the Budget of President Corazon Aquino during the transition period following the 1986 EDSA People Power Revolution. He was a senator from 1987 to 1998, during which time he served as Majority Leader for five years. As Majority Leader, he greatly helped then Senate President Neptali Gonzales, Sr. in running the plenary sessions of the Senate and in executing its legislative mill. In November 1989, Romulo avoided a fatal helicopter crash near Maulong, Catbalogan when an Army commander convinced him to ride another helicopter going to Catbalogan.

== Cabinet career ==
He became finance secretary in January 2001, having been appointed when President Gloria Macapagal Arroyo took office and formed her own cabinet. He left this position in May 2001; Romulo was later appointed as an executive secretary. On August 18, 2004, he was appointed foreign secretary, and which he would hold until February 25, 2011, under President Aquino. He served as Chairman of the Association of Southeast Asian Nations or ASEAN in 2007.

== Later career ==
In March 2017, Romulo was appointed chairman and director of the board of the Development Bank of the Philippines.
