= Eduardo Ermita =

Filipino military officer and politician (1935–2025)

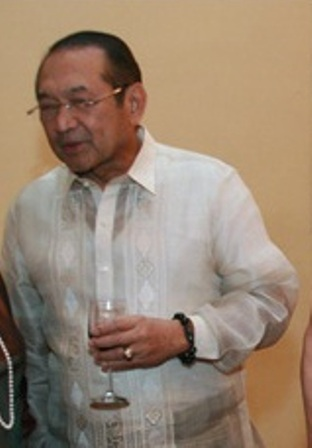

35th Executive Secretary of the Philippines
- In office August 23, 2004 – February 23, 2010
- President: Gloria Macapagal Arroyo
- Preceded by: Alberto Romulo
- Succeeded by: Leandro Mendoza

22nd Secretary of National Defense of the Philippines
- In office October 3, 2003 – August 23, 2004
- President: Gloria Macapagal Arroyo
- Preceded by: Gloria Macapagal Arroyo (acting)
- Succeeded by: Avelino Cruz Jr.
- In office January 25, 2001 – March 19, 2001 (Acting Secretary)
- President: Gloria Macapagal Arroyo
- Preceded by: Orlando Mercado
- Succeeded by: Angelo Reyes

Member of the Philippine House of Representatives from Batangas's 1st congressional district
- In office June 30, 1992 – January 25, 2001
- Preceded by: Conrado Apacible
- Succeeded by: Eileen Ermita-Buhain

Personal details
- Born: Eduardo Ramos Ermita; July 13, 1935 Balayan, Batangas
- Died: October 18, 2025 (aged 90) Batangas, Philippines
- Resting place: Libingan ng mga Bayani, Taguig, Metro Manila
- Party: Lakas (1991–2025)
- Spouse: Elvira Ramos
- Children: 4, including Eileen, Elisa Ermita Abad
- Education: Philippine Military Academy
- Profession: Politician, government official, military officer

Military service
- Branch: Philippine Constabulary
- Service years: 1957–1988
- Rank: Lieutenant General
- Commands: Deputy Chief of Staff of the Armed Forces of the Philippines
- Conflicts: Moro conflict; Vietnam War; Coup attempts against Corazon Aquino; 1989 Philippine coup attempt

Eduardo Ramos Ermita (July 13, 1935 – October 18, 2025) was a Filipino military officer and politician, who served as a Deputy Chief of Staff of the Armed Forces of the Philippines from 1986 to 1988, Executive Secretary of the Philippines from 2004 to 2010, spokesperson for President Gloria Macapagal Arroyo, and Member of the House of Representatives representing Batangas's 1st district from 1992 until 2001.

== Early life and education ==
Eduardo Ramos Ermita was born on July 13, 1935. In his childhood, Ermita lived in the towns of Balayan and Nasugbu, Batangas and survived the Japanese occupation of the Philippines during World War II

Ermita was a graduate of Philippine Military Academy class of 1957, and one of his batch mates was former AFP Chief of Staff Rene de Villa.

== Military career ==
Ermita narrated in his 2017 memoir about his combat experience in Mindanao as well as being part of the Philippine Civic Action Group in the Vietnam War.

Ermita was the Deputy Chief of Staff of the Armed Forces of the Philippines during the series of coup attempts from 1986 to 1988, Undersecretary of National Defense during the last major coup attempt in December 1989, head of the Special Information group during the EDSA People Power Revolution in February 1986, and president of the Philippine Military Academy Alumni Association from 1986 to 1988.

He was part of the peace negotiations with the Moro National Liberation Front from 1992 to 1996.

== Political career ==
Ermita was elected congressman in the 1st District of Batangas in 1992, defeating incumbent Conrado Apacible, a member of one of the most influential political families. He would serve for three terms until 2001.

He resigned from Congress on January 25, 2001, to become the acting Secretary of National Defense under the new administration of President Gloria Macapagal Arroyo, following the Second EDSA Revolution, until March 19, 2001. He was later appointed on October 3, 2003, as a full-time Secretary of National Defense. He was the provincial chairman of Lakas–CMD in Batangas and regional chairman of Lakas in Calabarzon since 1992.

Former executive secretary Eduardo Ermita, former President Gloria Macapagal-Arroyo, former Budget Secretary Rolando Andaya, former agrarian reform secretary Nasser Pangandaman, and entrepreneur Janet Lim-Napoles were charged for plunder by the National Bureau of Investigation before the Ombudsman in 2013 for allegedly diverting ₱900 million in the Malampaya fund scam.

== Personal life ==
Ermita was married to Elvira Ramos from Dipolog, with whom he had four children: Edwin Ermita (2007 and 2010 Batangas vice gubernatorial candidate), Ernestina Ermita, Eileen Ermita-Buhain (who succeeded him as Batangas 1st district representative), and Lisa Ermita-Abad (incumbent mayor of Balayan since 2025).

== Death ==
Ermita died in his residence in Batangas on October 18, 2025, at the age of 90. His wake was held at the Libingan ng mga Bayani on October 19–20 and at the Heritage Memorial Park on October 21–22, both in Taguig. His remains were interred at the Libingan ng mga Bayani on October 23.

Military offices
Preceded by Serapio Martillano	Deputy Chief-of-Staff, Armed Forces of the Philippines; 1986–1988	Succeeded by Renato de Villa
House of Representatives of the Philippines
Preceded by Conrado Apacible	Representative, 1st District of Batangas; 1992–2001	Succeeded by Eileen Ermita-Buhain
Political offices
Preceded by Orly Mercado	Secretary of National Defense; Acting; 2001	Succeeded by Angelo Reyes
Preceded by Gloria Macapagal Arroyo; Acting	Secretary of National Defense; 2003–2004	Succeeded by Avelino J. Cruz, Jr.
Preceded by Alberto Romulo	Executive Secretary of the Philippines; 2004–2010	Succeeded by Leandro Mendoza
