= Vic Rodriguez (lawyer) =

Filipino lawyer (born 1973)

Victor Rodriguez
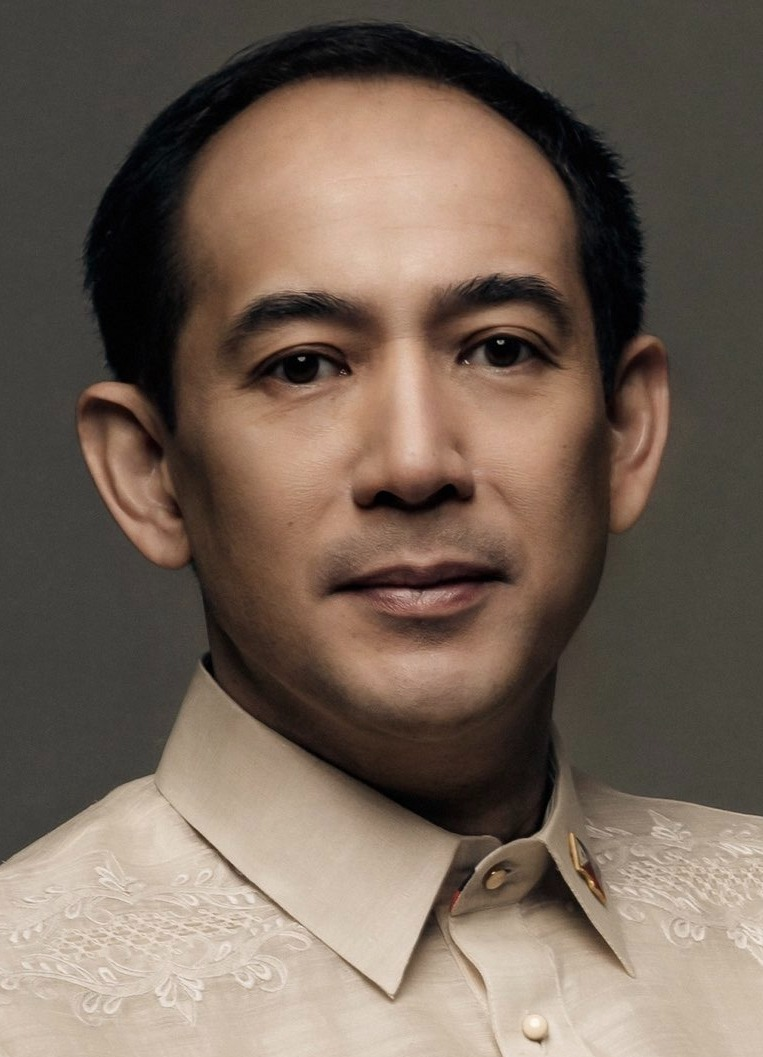
- Rodriguez in 2022

39th Executive Secretary of the Philippines Ad Interim
- In office June 30, 2022 – September 17, 2022
- President: Bongbong Marcos
- Preceded by: Salvador Medialdea
- Succeeded by: Lucas Bersamin

Punong Barangay of Sacred Heart, Quezon City
- In office 1992–1996

Personal details
- Born: Victor Dayrit Rodriguez; December 23, 1973 (age 52) Quezon City, Philippines
- Party: Independent (2022–present)
- Other political affiliations: PFP (until 2022)
- Education: University of Santo Tomas (LL.B)
- Occupation: Politician
- Profession: Lawyer

Victor Dayrit Rodriguez (born December 23, 1973) is a Filipino lawyer who served as the Executive Secretary from June to September 2022 in the administration of 17th President Bongbong Marcos, and previously served as Marcos' campaign spokesperson. He was also the executive vice president and general campaign manager of Partido Federal ng Pilipinas during the Marcos 2022 campaign.

== Education ==
Rodriguez attended the University of Santo Tomas in Manila where he obtained his law degree. He also had executive education at the National University of Singapore (NUS) Negotiation and Influence Program.

== Career ==
Rodriguez is a lawyer and was involved in various law organizations. He is the managing lawyer of Rodriguez & Partners Law Firm which he helped establish in 2003. He is also president of Quezon City Trial Lawyers League, and was treasurer of the UST Law Alumni Foundation (USTLAFI). He was also deputy general counsel of the Integrated Bar of the Philippines.

He was first elected as a barangay kagawad of Sacred Heart, Quezon City before being elected as its barangay captain at age 19 and became the youngest person to hold the position. He joined the Quezon City government in 2002 after his one-decade tenure as barangay captain, and was appointed special assistant to the chief of the Business Permits and Licensing Office by then Mayor Feliciano Belmonte Jr. He then became officer in charge of the city's Community Relations Office.

Rodriguez co-founded the tabloid Saksi Ngayon with Antonio Lagdameo Jr.

He was also legal counsel of Bongbong Marcos, who filed an electoral protest against Vice President Leni Robredo after losing the 2016 vice presidential race. On February 16, 2021, the electoral protest was dismissed by the Presidential Electoral Tribunal.

=== 2022 Marcos presidential campaign ===
Rodriguez served as spokesperson and chief of staff of then-candidate Bongbong Marcos during his presidential campaign in the 2022 elections. After Marcos won the presidency, Rodriguez became part of lead the transition team to help Marcos build the initial composition of his cabinet.

=== Executive Secretary ===
Rodriguez relinquished his role as Marcos Jr.’s spokesperson in preparation for his role as President Bongbong Marcos's Executive Secretary.

Embattled by controversies relating to his roles in the sugar importation order fiasco and contentious appointments of some government officials, Rodriguez resigned on September 17, 2022, after less than three months in his position, but continued on in the role of Presidential Chief of Staff; Rodriguez cited the need to spend more time with his family. Rodriguez unsuccessfully attempted to give himself additional powers as the Presidential Chief of Staff after Marcos rejected his plan upon the recommendation of Marcos' Chief Presidential Legal Counsel Juan Ponce Enrile.

=== Post-cabinet ===
In November 2022, Marcos' political party, Partido Federal ng Pilipinas (PFP), expelled Rodriguez as its executive vice president, citing "loss of trust and confidence" and "acts inimical to the party". Upon learning about it, Marcos did not object to the expulsion. The PFP blamed Rodriguez for the unsuccessful presidential appointment of PFP members, remarking Rodriguez was "supposed to be our champion in the appointments process". In response, Rodriguez said he could not allow an unqualified applicant be appointed just because he or she is a PFP member; Rodriguez added: "My loyalty to Partido Federal ng Pilipinas ends where the interest of the 31.6 million Filipinos who believed in us during the campaign, and my loyalty to the Republic of the Philippines begins".

On January 28, 2024, Rodriguez spoke at a protest in Davao City against proposals to amend the Constitution of the Philippines that was being supported by officials within the Marcos administration, saying that he felt responsible for the developments as he had convinced many voters to elect Marcos as president. Rodriguez said that he was invited to the event by Leoncio Evasco Jr., the cabinet secretary of Marcos' predecessor as president, Rodrigo Duterte.

On April 16, 2024, Rodriguez told Marcos Jr., to take a "credible hair follicle drug testing" to end all accusations that he is an illegal drug user, especially since Rodrigo Duterte publicly said that Marcos is always "stoned"

In October 2024, Rodriguez filed his candidacy to run in the 2025 Philippine Senate election. Despite being an independent, he was included under the Duterte-led Partido Demokratiko Pilipino (PDP) senatorial slate. However, he lost, placing 23rd in the race out of the 12 seats up for election.

==== Kingmaker: The Hardcopy ====
In July 2024, a book authored by newsman Gerry Lirio, titled Kingmaker: The Hardcopy, was launched, detailing Rodriguez' personal experiences during his 79 days working as Executive Secretary (ES) under the Bongbong Marcos administration. In the book, Rodriguez recounts how his relationship with Marcos' wife, First Lady Liza Araneta, soured after Araneta began inserting her influence in government agencies that generate revenue and wanted power over military appointments. Rodriguez also stated Araneta allegedly accused him of wiretapping her using the Intelligence Service of the Armed Forces of the Philippines (ISAFP). As a result of these issues, Rodriguez said he was forced to resign as Marcos' ES.

Political offices
Preceded by Salvador Medialdea	Executive Secretary of the Philippines; 2022	Succeeded by Lucas Bersamin
