= Eileen Ermita-Buhain =

Filipino politician

Member of the Philippine House of Representatives from Batangas' 1st district
- In office June 30, 2013 – June 30, 2022
- Preceded by: Tomas Apacible
- Succeeded by: Eric Buhain
- In office June 30, 2001 – June 30, 2010
- Preceded by: Eduardo Ermita
- Succeeded by: Tomas Apacible

Personal details
- Born: Ma. Elenita Milagros Ramos Ermita; May 12, 1969 (age 56)
- Party: Nacionalista (2009–present)
- Other political affiliations: Lakas (2000–2009)
- Spouse: Eric Buhain (m. 1995)
- Parent(s): Eduardo Ermita; Elvira Ramos
- Education: De La Salle University (AB)

Ma. Elenita Milagros Ramos Ermita-Buhain (born May 12, 1969), more commonly known as Eileen Ermita-Buhain, is a Filipino politician who served as a member of the House of Representatives of the Philippines, representing the 1st district of Batangas from 2013 to 2022 and previously from 2001 to 2010. She is a member of the Nacionalista Party.

Ermita-Buhain is married to the swimmer and former Olympian Eric Buhain, representative of the 1st district of Batangas from 2022 to 2025, former chairman of the Games and Amusement Board. She is the daughter of Eduardo Ermita, who served as the Executive Secretary under President Gloria Macapagal Arroyo from 2004 to 2010.

House of Representatives of the Philippines
Preceded by Eduardo Ermita	Representative, 1st District of Batangas; 2001–2010	Succeeded by Tomas Apacible
Preceded by Tomas Apacible	Representative, 1st District of Batangas; 2013–present	Incumbent
