= Leandro Mendoza =

Filipino public official and retired police officer (1946–2013)

36th Executive Secretary of the Philippines
- In office February 23, 2010 – June 30, 2010
- President: Gloria Macapagal Arroyo
- Preceded by: Eduardo Ermita
- Succeeded by: Paquito Ochoa Jr.

Secretary of Transportation and Communications
- In office July 3, 2002 – February 23, 2010
- President: Gloria Macapagal Arroyo
- Preceded by: Pantaleon Alvarez
- Succeeded by: Anneli R. Lontoc (Acting)

Chief of the Philippine National Police
- In office March 16, 2001 – March 16, 2002; Acting: January 22, 2001 – March 16, 2001
- President: Gloria Macapagal Arroyo
- Preceded by: Panfilo Lacson
- Succeeded by: Hermogenes E. Ebdane, Jr.

Personal details
- Born: Leandro Ramos Mendoza; March 17, 1946 San Juan, Batangas
- Died: October 7, 2013 (aged 67) San Juan, Batangas
- Resting place: Manila Memorial Park – Sucat, Paranaque, Philippines
- Education: Philippine Military Academy
- Profession: Police officer
- Police career
- Service: Philippine National Police
- Allegiance: Philippines
- Divisions: National Capital Region Police Office; Office of the Deputy Chief, PNP; Office of the Chief of Staff; Director for Intelligence; Regional Command, Region 4; Provincial Command, Pangasinan; Provincial Command, Bulacan; Provincial Command, Rizal; Provincial Command, Cebu
- Service years: 1969 – 2002
- Rank: Director General

Leandro "Larry" Ramos Mendoza (March 17, 1946 – October 7, 2013) was a Filipino policeman and public official who served as Executive Secretary of the Philippines. He previously served as Chief of the Philippine National Police and Transportation and Communications secretary.

== Early life ==
Mendoza was born in San Juan, Batangas. He finished his Bachelor of Science degree at the Philippine Military Academy; his Master of Arts in Public Management at the University of the Philippines - Visayas, Cebu City; and General Staff Course at the AFPCGSC, Fort Bonifacio.

== Police History ==
Secretary Mendoza was a professional police officer and a noted management practitioner. His various professional experiences from his stint as a second lieutenant in the regular force of the Philippine Constabulary up until his appointment as Executive Director of the Philippines Center on Transnational Crime have prepared him to assume the role of the top law enforcer in the country.

He replaced Panfilo Lacson as PNP Chief, but due to Lacson is only resigned on January 22, 2001, Mendoza's rank was only Deputy Director General. He was only promoted to the rank of Police Director General on March 16, 2001.

== DOTC secretary ==
On July 3, 2002, President Gloria Macapagal Arroyo appointed Mendoza as the Secretary of the Department of Transportation and Communications (DOTC).

== FAA downgrade ==
On January 17, 2008, the US Federal Aviation Administration (FAA) downgraded the Philippines' rating to Category 2 from Category 1, since its Air Transportation Office (Philippines) (ATO) did not follow international safety standards. Consequently, Philippine Airlines (PAL) president Jaime Bautista stated that its 2008 growth targets would be lowered. Just out of 8 years receivership last year, the FAA decision prevents PAL from increasing US flights from 33 per week, inter alia.

Meanwhile, President Gloria Macapagal Arroyo dismissed acting Air Transportation Office chief Danilo Dimagiba after the said FAA rating downgrade on the Philippine aviation industry (after it "failed to comply with the aviation standards set by the International Civil Aviation Organization (ICAO): outdated aviation regulations, poor training programs for safety inspectors and sub-standard licensing for air frame and engine inspectors"). Mendoz was designated by the President Arroyo as concurrent Officer in Charge of ATO. Also, the Embassy of the United States in Manila warned US citizens in the Philippines "to refrain from using Philippine-based carriers due to "serious concerns" about the ATO's alleged mishandling of the aviation industry." Dimagiba blamed lack of funds for the FAA downgrade, alleging that ATO nees P 1 billion ($ 1= P40).

== Personal life ==
Mendoza was married to former Soledad Latorre of Lambunao, Iloilo: they have three sons and three daughters namely Maria Leah & Raymond, Michael & Eileen, former Batangas 4th District Representative Mark Llandro & Rochelle, Maria Leilani & Rey, Matthew and Maria Leanne. His brothers and sisters: Dorie & Romy (†), Lina & Carlos (†), Aida & Ricky, and Efren & Joy. His grandchildren: Marcus, Marth, Joshua, Migs, Macoy, Mico, Chin-Chin, Kiko, Moi-Moi, Mimai and King.

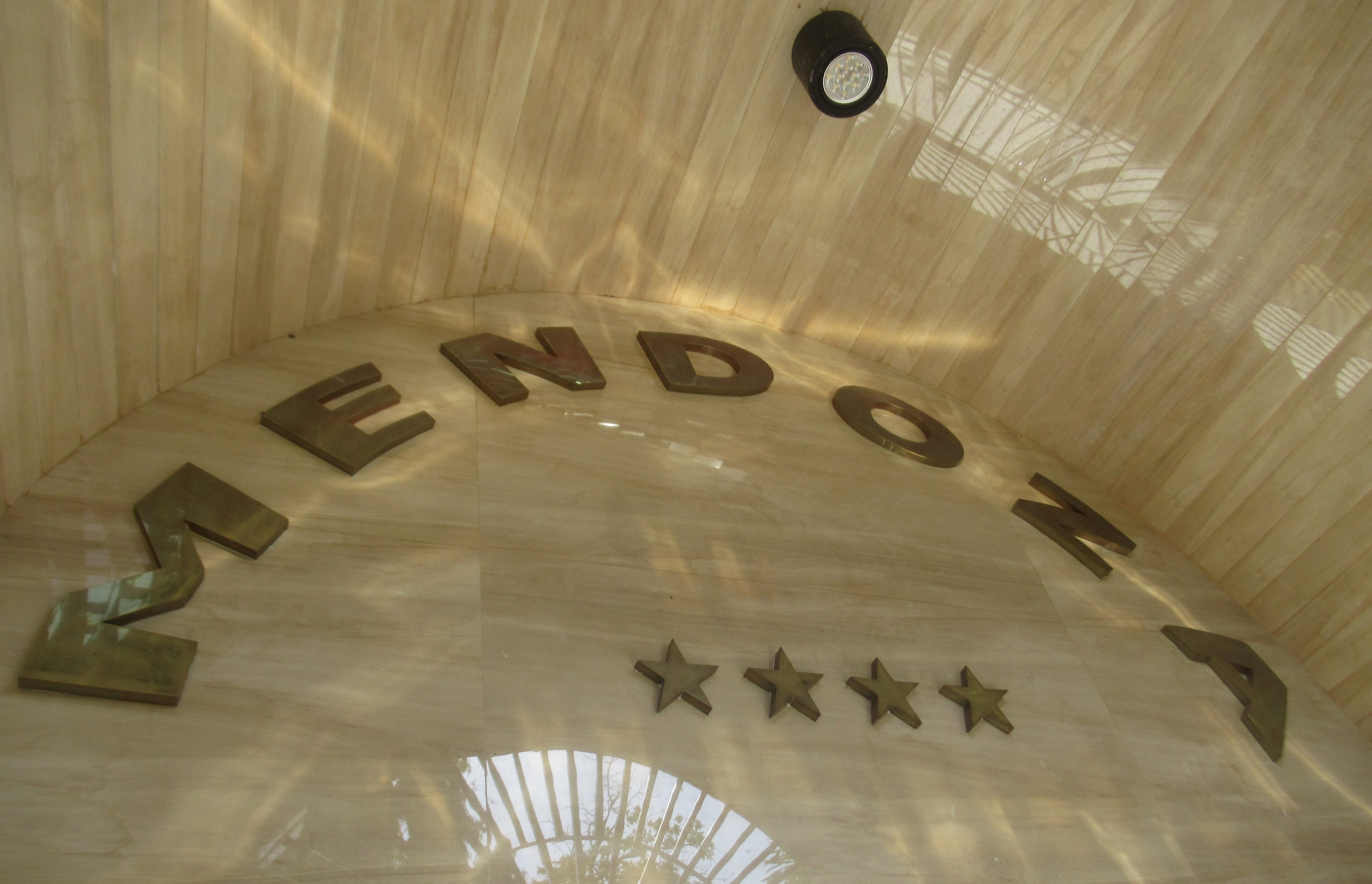
Mendoza's grave at Manila Memorial Park – Sucat.

== Death ==
Mendoza died of a heart attack on October 7, 2013. He was 67. His son, Batangas Representative Mark Llandro Mendoza, himself confirmed the news, former Department of Transportation and Communication (DOTC) Undersecretary Thompson Lantion told Inquirer.net over the phone. Lantion said the family would bring the body to Heritage Memorial Park in Taguig.

DZIQ Radyo Inquirer also reported that Mendoza's death was announced at the Land Transportation Office's (LTO) flag raising ceremony by Engineer Joel Donato, chief of the LTO Motor Vehicle Inspection Section.

Police appointments
Preceded by Panfilo Lacson	Chief of the Philippine National Police	Succeeded by Hermogenes E. Ebdane, Jr.
Government offices
Preceded by Pantaleon Alvarez	Secretary of Transportation and Communications	Succeeded by Anneli R. Lontoc (Acting)
Preceded by Eduardo Ermita	Executive Secretary of the Philippines	Succeeded by Paquito Ochoa Jr.
