= Salvador Medialdea =

Filipino lawyer and government official (born 1951)

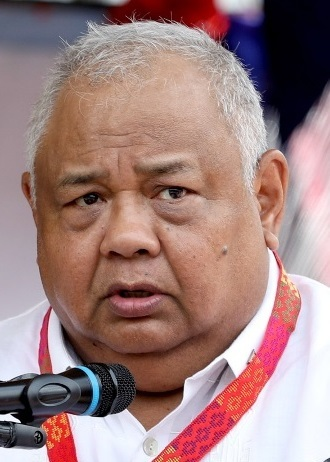
- Medialdea in March 2018

38th Executive Secretary
- In office June 30, 2016 – June 30, 2022
- President: Rodrigo Duterte
- Preceded by: Paquito Ochoa Jr.
- Succeeded by: Victor Rodriguez

Chairman of the National Quincentennial Committee
- In office May 8, 2018 – April 27, 2022
- Appointed by: Rodrigo Duterte
- Preceded by: Position established

Presidential Assistant for Political Affairs
- In office July 2000 – November 2000
- President: Joseph Estrada

President of the National Livelihood Development Corporation
- In office October 1998 – June 15, 2000
- President: Joseph Estrada

Personal details
- Born: Salvador Campo Medialdea; October 14, 1951 (age 75)
- Party: PDP
- Spouse: Maria Bertola Dizon Medialdea
- Children: Paolo Angelo Dizon Medialdea
- Education: Colegio de San Juan de Letran (BS); San Beda College (LL.B.)
- Occupation: Lawyer
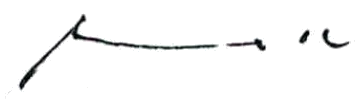
- Signature

Salvador "Bingbong" Campo Medialdea (born October 14, 1951) is a Filipino lawyer and former government official. He served as the executive secretary from 2016 to 2022 in the administration of President Rodrigo Duterte. He previously served as Presidential Assistant for Political Affairs and president of the National Livelihood Development Corporation under President Joseph Estrada.

In March 2025, Medialdea served as Duterte's counsel during the latter's arrest and subsequent pre-trial hearing at the International Criminal Court (ICC).

== Early life and education ==
Medialdea is the son of former Supreme Court Associate Justice Leo D. Medialdea who served from 1988 to 1992 under President Corazon Aquino. Medialdea spent his early years in Davao City, where he was a childhood friend of President Rodrigo Duterte. He attended the Light Bringer School in the city before moving back to Manila to finish high school at Paco Catholic School. He received his BS Commerce Major in Management from Colegio de San Juan de Letran in 1972 and his law degree from San Beda College of Law in 1976. He passed the bar exams the following year.

== Career ==
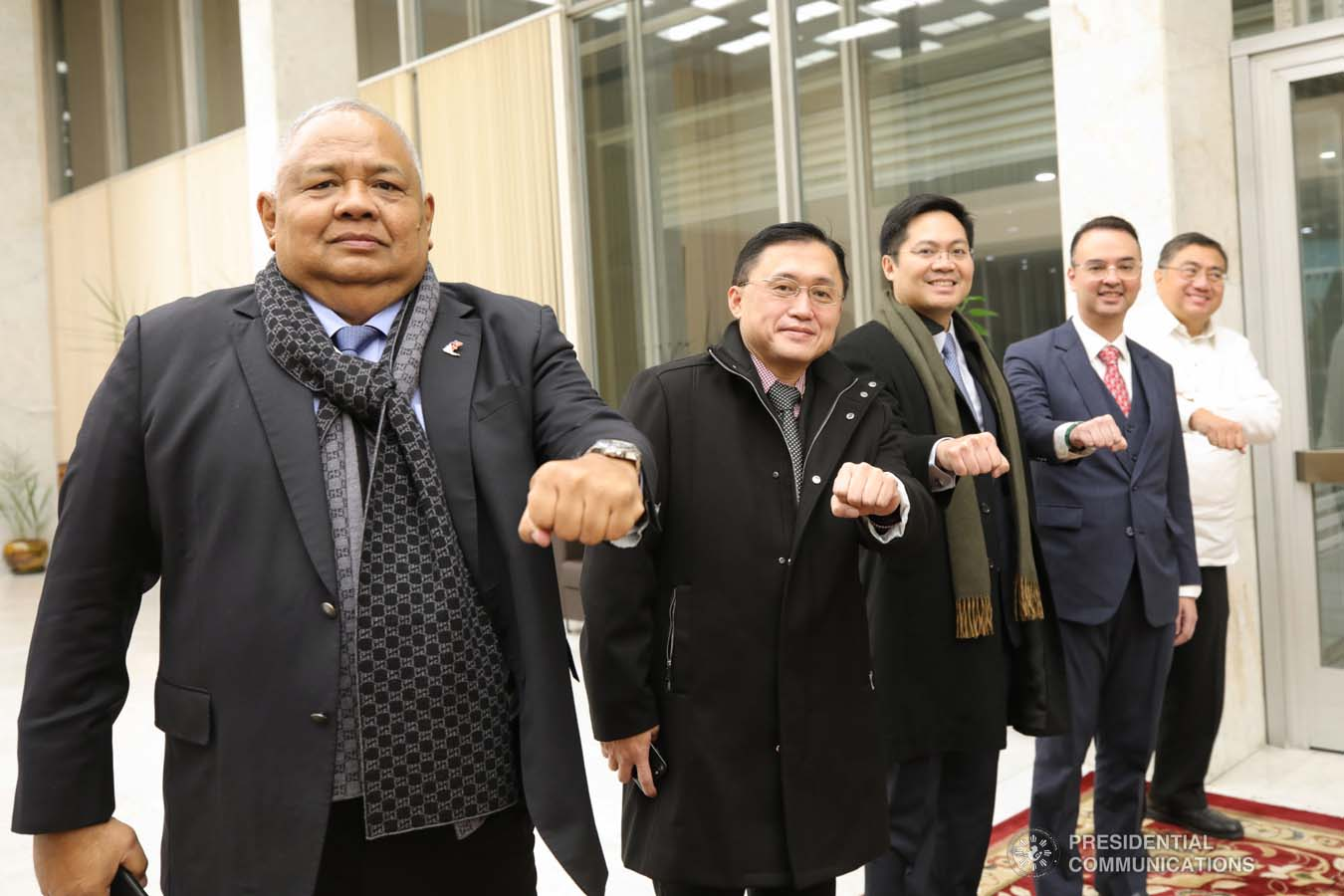
Medialdea (left) at the Vnukovo Base Airport in Moscow in 2019

Medialdea began his legal career as a senior associate at ACCRA Law Offices. He then worked as a partner at Pecabar Law Offices, the law firm of Senators Juan Ponce Enrile and Rene Cayetano, before becoming a managing partner at Medialdea Ata Bello Guevarra Suarez Law Firm (MABGS).

From 1998 to 2000, he served as chairman of the Northern Foods Corporation based in Sarrat, Ilocos Norte. He began work in government in 1998 at the Livelihood Corporation (now National Livelihood Development Corporation) upon the invitation of President Joseph Estrada. He became a member of the board of trustees and administrator of the government-owned corporation while also serving as chairman of the Guarantee Fund for Small and Medium Enterprises. In 2000, he was appointed by Estrada as presidential assistant for political affairs.

At the start of President Rodrigo Duterte's term on June 30, 2016, Medialdea was appointed Executive Secretary. Medialdea is among the "Davao Boys", a small circle of Duterte's closest and trusted associates.

Medialdea still serves as partner at the MABGS law firm, whose clients include President Duterte. He is also director for Manchester International Holdings and Accette Insurance. He also served briefly as bar examiner for the Supreme Court in 2006.

On May 8, 2018, President Duterte created the National Quincentennial Committee for the 500th anniversary commemoration of the arrival of the Magellan-Elcano expedition in the Philippine islands, appointing Medialdea as chairman of the committee. They held their inaugural meeting on June 29, 2018, in Baler, Aurora.

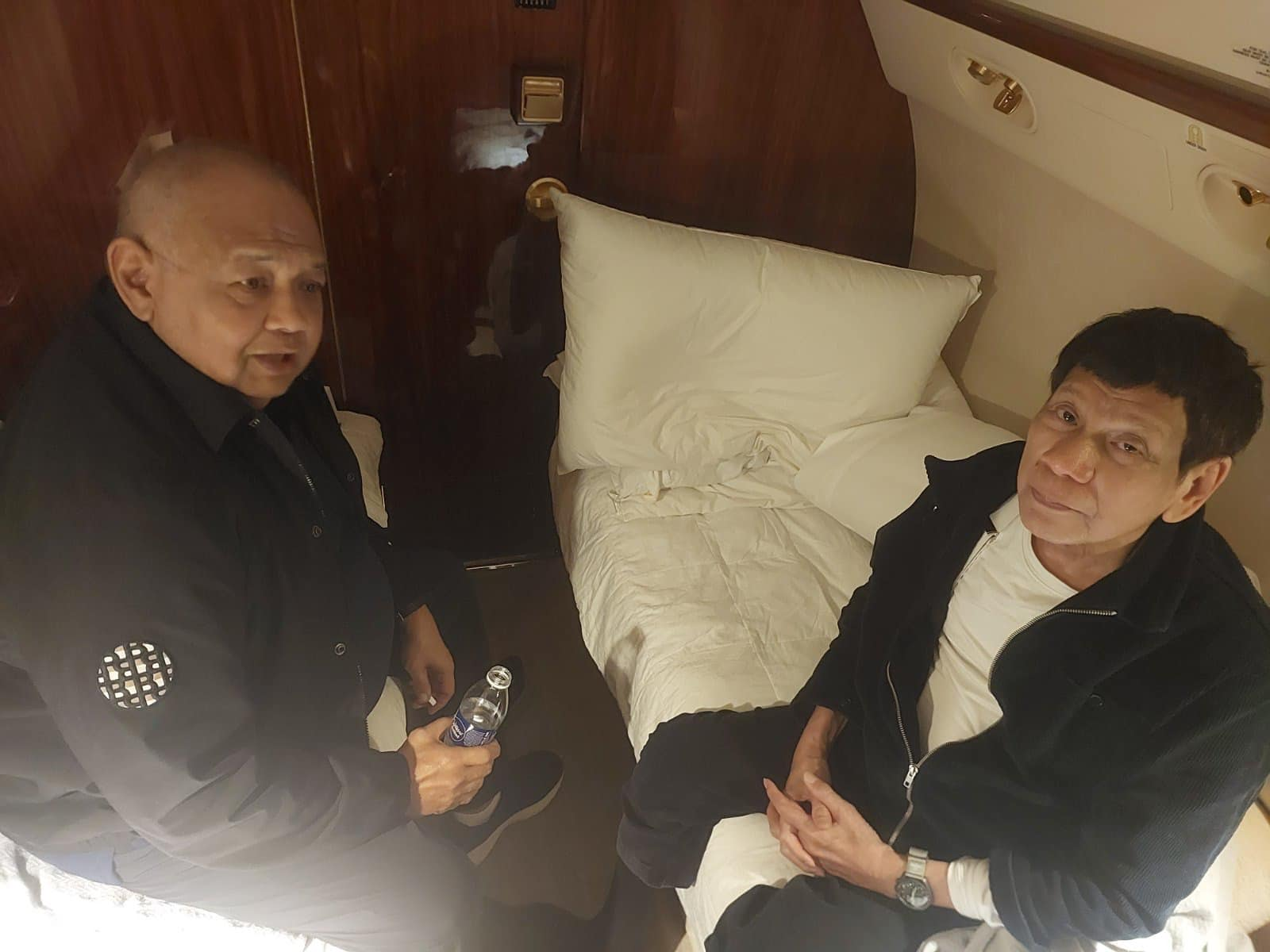
Medialdea (left) accompanying Duterte on board a plane to The Hague for Duterte's trial.

A close ally of Duterte, Medialdea was among the few people who accompanied the former president when he was arrested by police authorities in March 2025 based on a warrant issued by the International Criminal Court (ICC) accusing Duterte of crimes against humanity. On March 14, 2025, he acted as Duterte's lawyer at the first appearance in front of the Pre-Trial Chamber. On March 18, Medialdea was hospitalized after visiting Duterte in detention. The next day, it was announced that he would withdraw from Duterte's legal team, citing limited slots.

== Personal life ==
Medialdea is married to Maria Bertola "Betty" Dizon, a lawyer and head of an insurance company, with whom he has one son. His family has roots in Davao City, Aklan, and Ilocos Region. Outside of work, he enjoys playing piano and classical music. He was one of the producers of Miss Saigon in Manila in 2000 and formally closed the 2019 Southeast Asian Games.

Political offices
| Preceded by Paquito Ochoa Jr. | Executive Secretary of the Philippines; 2016–2022 | Succeeded by Victor Rodriguez |
