= Executive Secretary (Philippines) =

Position in the cabinet of the Philippines

Office of the Executive Secretary
- Tanggapan ng Kalihim Tagapagpaganap
- Seal

Cabinet overview
- Formed: October 12, 1936
- Cabinet executives: Ralph Recto, Executive Secretary; Leonardo Roy Cervantes, Undersecretary; Vacant, Undersecretary; Al-Azree Mohammadsali, Undersecretary; Jose Marcell Canlas, Undersecretary
- Parent Cabinet: Office of the President
- Website: Office of the Executive Secretary

Executive Secretary
- Kalihim Tagapagpaganap

- Incumbent; Ralph Recto (Ad interim) since November 17, 2025
- Style: The Honorable
- Member of: Cabinet, National Security Council
- Appointer: The president with the consent of the Commission on Appointments
- Term length: At the president's pleasure
- Inaugural holder: Jorge Vargas
- Formation: October 12, 1936

The Office of the Executive Secretary of the Philippines (formerly the Executive Office) is the head and highest-ranking official of the Office of the President of the Philippines and a member of the Cabinet of the Philippines.

The office-holder has been nicknamed as the "Little President" due to the nature and mandate of the position "to directly assist the President in the management of affairs of the government as well as to direct the operations of the Executive Office." It is headed by the executive secretary in which appointed by the president with the confirmation by the Commission on Appointments.

The office was established on October 12, 1936, with Jorge B. Vargas as the inaugural holder.

The position of executive secretary is currently held by former Finance Secretary Ralph Recto.

== Powers and duties ==
In Book III, Chapter 9, Section 27 of Executive Order No. 292, the Administrative Code of the Philippines, the role of the Executive Secretary was defined as:

Sec. 27. Functions of the Executive Secretary. - The Executive Secretary shall, subject to the control and supervision of the President, carry out the functions assigned by law to the Executive Office and shall perform such other duties as may be delegated to him. He shall:

1. Directly assist the President in the management of the affairs pertaining to the Government of the Republic of the Philippines;
2. Implement presidential directives, orders and decisions;
3. Decide, for and in behalf of the President, matters not requiring personal presidential attention;
4. Exercise supervision and control over the various units in the Office of the President Proper including their internal administrative requirements;
5. Exercise supervision, in behalf of the President, over the various agencies under the Office of the President;
6. Appoint officials and employees of the Office of the President whose appointments are not vested in the President;
7. Provide overall coordination in the operation of the Executive Office;
8. Determine and assign matters to the appropriate units in the Office of the President;
9. Have administrative responsibility for matters in the Office of the President coming from the various departments and agencies of government;
10. Exercise primary authority to sign papers "By authority of the President", attest executive orders and other presidential issuances unless attestation is specifically delegated to other officials by him or by the President;
11. Determine, with the President's approval, the appropriate assignment of offices and agencies not placed by law under any specific executive department;
12. Provide consultative, research, fact-finding and advisory service to the President;
13. Assist the President in the performance of functions pertaining to legislation;
14. Assist the President in the administration of special projects;
15. Take charge of matters pertaining to protocol in State and ceremonial functions;
16. Provide secretarial and clerical services for the President, the Cabinet, the Council of State, and other advisory bodies to the President
17. Promulgate such rules and regulations necessary to carry out the objectives, policies and functions of the Office of the President Proper;
18. Perform such other functions as the President may direct.

The executive secretary possesses so much power since the holder of the office is the chief alter-ego of the president of the Philippines, the chief executive. The executive secretary can issue orders in the name of the president, can review and modify decisions of other cabinet secretaries on appeal and can perform numerous other functions as allowed or delegated by the chief executive. The executive secretary, can also be the top coordinator of the activities of the executive branch of the government, if necessary.

== List of executive secretaries ==
Executive Secretary
- Kalihim Tagapagpaganap

- Incumbent; Ralph Recto since November 17, 2025
- Style: The Honorable
- Member of: Cabinet; National Security Council
- Appointer: President of the Philippines with the consent of the Commission on Appointments
- Term length: At the pleasure of the president
- Inaugural holder: Jorge Vargas
- Formation: October 12, 1936

=== Secretary to the President (1936–1944) ===
No.	Portrait	Name (Birth–Death)	Took office	Left office	President
1		Jorge B. Vargas (1890–1980)	October 12, 1936	December 11, 1941	Manuel L. Quezon
2		Manuel Roxas (1892–1948)	December 24, 1941	March 26, 1942	Manuel L. Quezon
3		Arturo Rotor (1907–1988)	June 13, 1942	November 30, 1944	Manuel L. Quezon
3		Arturo Rotor (1907–1988)	June 13, 1942	November 30, 1944	Sergio Osmeña

=== Executive Secretary (1943–1945) ===
No.	Portrait	Name (Birth–Death)	Took office	Left office	President
4		Jose Gil	October 14, 1943	August 30, 1944	Jose P. Laurel
5		Emilio Abello	August 31, 1944	February 27, 1945	Jose P. Laurel

=== Secretary to the President (1945–1946) ===
No.	Portrait	Name (Birth–Death)	Took office	Left office	President
6		Jose Reyes	February 27, 1945	May 24, 1946	Sergio Osmeña
(5)		Emilio Abello	May 30, 1946	July 4, 1946	Manuel Roxas

=== Chief of the Executive Office (1946–1947) ===
No.	Portrait	Name (Birth–Death)	Took office	Left office	President
(5)		Emilio Abello	July 4, 1946	September 3, 1947	Manuel Roxas
7		Nicanor Roxas	September 10, 1947	October 3, 1947	Manuel Roxas

=== Executive Secretary (1947–1975) ===
No.	Portrait	Name (Birth–Death)	Took office	Left office	President
(7)		Nicanor Roxas	October 4, 1947	February 6, 1948	Manuel Roxas
(5)		Emilio Abello	February 26, 1948	September 14, 1948	Manuel Roxas
(5)		Emilio Abello	February 26, 1948	September 14, 1948	Elpidio Quirino
8		Teodoro Evangelista	September 16, 1948	May 8, 1951	Elpidio Quirino
9		Marciano Roque	February 2, 1952	December 29, 1953	Elpidio Quirino
10		Fred Ruiz Castro (1914–1979)	December 30, 1953	October 26, 1955	Ramon Magsaysay
11		Fortunato de Leon	April 12, 1956	December 30, 1957	Ramon Magsaysay
11		Fortunato de Leon	April 12, 1956	December 30, 1957	Carlos P. Garcia
12		Juan Pajo	January 16, 1958	August 28, 1959	Carlos P. Garcia
13		Natalio Castillo	January 24, 1960	September 5, 1961	Carlos P. Garcia
14		Rafael M. Salas (1928–1987)	January 1, 1966	July 24, 1969	Ferdinand Marcos
15		Ernesto Maceda (1935–2016)	July 26, 1969	February 7, 1970	Ferdinand Marcos
16		Alejandro Melchor Jr.	February 9, 1970	November 4, 1974	Ferdinand Marcos
17		Ponciano Mathay	November 7, 1974	December 7, 1975	Ferdinand Marcos

=== Presidential Executive Assistant (1975–1986) ===
No.	Portrait	Name (Birth–Death)	Took office	Left office	President
18		Jacobo Clave	December 8, 1975	December 23, 1979	Ferdinand Marcos
19		Juan Tuvera	December 30, 1979	February 22, 1986	Ferdinand Marcos
20		Joker Arroyo (1927–2015)	February 25, 1986	March 25, 1986	Corazon Aquino

=== Executive Secretary (since 1986) ===
No.	Portrait	Name (Birth–Death)	Took office	Left office	President
(20)		Joker Arroyo (1927–2015)	March 25, 1986	September 15, 1987	Corazon Aquino
21		Catalino Macaraig Jr. (1927–2003)	September 17, 1987	December 14, 1990	Corazon Aquino
22		Oscar Orbos (born 1951)	December 16, 1990	July 14, 1991	Corazon Aquino
23		Franklin Drilon (born 1945)	July 15, 1991	June 30, 1992	Corazon Aquino
—		Peter Garrucho Jr. Acting	July 1, 1992	September 13, 1992	Fidel V. Ramos
24		Edelmiro Amante (1933–2013)	September 14, 1992	June 30, 1993	Fidel V. Ramos
25		Teofisto Guingona Jr. (born 1928)	July 6, 1993	May 19, 1995	Fidel V. Ramos
26		Ruben Torres (born 1941)	May 20, 1995	January 8, 1998	Fidel V. Ramos
27		Alexander Aguirre	January 9, 1998	June 30, 1998	Fidel V. Ramos
28		Ronaldo Zamora (born 1944)	July 1, 1998	December 31, 2000	Joseph Estrada
29		Edgardo Angara (1934–2018)	January 6, 2001	January 20, 2001	Joseph Estrada
30		Renato de Villa (born 1935)	January 22, 2001	May 7, 2001	Gloria Macapagal Arroyo
31		Alberto Romulo (born 1933)	May 8, 2001	August 24, 2004	Gloria Macapagal Arroyo
32		Eduardo Ermita (1935–2025)	August 24, 2004	February 23, 2010	Gloria Macapagal Arroyo
33		Leandro Mendoza (1946–2013)	February 24, 2010	June 30, 2010	Gloria Macapagal Arroyo
34		Paquito Ochoa Jr. (born 1960)	June 30, 2010	June 30, 2016	Benigno Aquino III
35		Salvador Medialdea (born 1951)	June 30, 2016	June 30, 2022	Rodrigo Duterte
36		Vic Rodriguez (born 1973)	June 30, 2022	September 17, 2022	Bongbong Marcos
37		Lucas Bersamin (born 1949)	September 27, 2022	November 17, 2025	Bongbong Marcos
38		Ralph Recto (born 1964)	November 17, 2025	Incumbent Ad Interim	Bongbong Marcos
