= Batangas's at-large congressional district =

At-large Philippine legislative district for Batangas

- Former constituency for the Malolos Congress, National Assembly of the Philippines and Batasang Pambansa
- Province: Batangas
- Region: Southern Tagalog (1984–1986)

Former constituency
- Created: 1898 (first creation); 1943 (second creation); 1984 (third creation)
- Abolished: 1907 (first abolition); 1945 (second abolition); 1986 (third abolition)

Batangas's at-large congressional district may refer to three occasions when a provincewide at-large district was used for elections to the various Philippine national legislatures representing Batangas.

From 1898 to 1901, four representatives from the province who were elected at-large sat in the Malolos Congress, the national assembly of the First Philippine Republic. Batangas was reorganized under the Philippine Insular Government in 1901 and was divided into three districts for the Philippine Assembly in 1907. From 1943 to 1944, the province as a whole sent two representatives to the national assembly during the Second Republic. Multiple-district representation was restored in the province in 1945.

In 1978, regional at-large assembly districts were created for the Interim Batasang Pambansa, the national parliament, with Batangas included in the 20-seat Region IV-A at-large district. The province returned to its own single, multi-member at-large district in 1984, with a four-seat delegation to the Regular Batasang Pambansa during the Fourth Republic. After 1986, Batangas elected its representatives from its separate congressional districts. The district was last represented by Manuel Collantes of Kilusang Bagong Lipunan (KBL), Jose Laurel Jr. of the United Nationalist Democratic Organization (UNIDO), and Hernando Perez and Rafael Recto of the Nacionalista Party.

== List of members representing the district ==
=== Malolos Congress (1898–1901) ===
Seat A					Seat B					Seat C					Seat D					Legislature	Constituency
Portrait	Member (Lifespan)	Term of office	Party	Electoral history	Portrait	Member (Lifespan)	Term of office	Party	Electoral history	Portrait	Member (Lifespan)	Term of office	Party	Electoral history	Portrait	Member (Lifespan)	Term of office	Party	Electoral history	Legislature	Constituency
District created June 18, 1898.
	Gregorio Aguilera (1869–1921)	September 15, 1898 – March 23, 1901	Nonpartisan	Elected in 1898.		Ambrosio Flores (1843–1912)	September 15, 1898 – March 23, 1901	Nonpartisan	Elected in 1898.		Eduardo Gutierrez David (1875–1969)	September 15, 1898 – March 23, 1901	Nonpartisan	Elected in 1898.		Mariano Lopez	September 15, 1898 – March 23, 1901	Nonpartisan	Elected in 1898.	Malolos Congress	1898–1901; Balayan, Batangan, Bauan, Calaca, Cuenca, Ibaan, Lemery, Lian, Lipa, Lobo, Nasugbu, Rosario, San Jose, San Juan, San Luis, Santo Tomas, Taal, Talisay, Tanauan, Tuy
District dissolved into Batangas's 1st, 2nd, and 3rd districts for the Philippine Assembly.

=== National Assembly (1935–1944) ===
==== Second Republic ====
Seat A					Seat B					Legislature	Constituency
Portrait	Member (Lifespan)	Term of office	Party	Electoral history	Portrait	Member (Lifespan)	Term of office	Party	Electoral history	Legislature	Constituency
District re-created September 7, 1943.
	Jose Laurel Jr. (1912–1998)	September 25, 1943 – February 2, 1944	KALIBAPI	Elected in 1943.		Maximo Malvar (1895–1969)	September 25, 1943 – February 2, 1944	KALIBAPI	Appointed as an ex officio member. (Note: As Governor of Batangas.)	National Assembly (Second Republic)	1943–1944; Alitagtag, Balayan, Batangas City, Bauan, Calaca, Calatagan, Cuenca, Ibaan, Lemery, Lian, Lipa, Lobo, Mabini, Malvar, Mataasnakahoy, Nasugbu, Rosario, San Jose, San Juan, San Luis, Santo Tomas, Taal, Talisay, Tanauan, Taysan, Tuy
District dissolved into Batangas's 1st, 2nd, and 3rd districts for the House of Representatives.

=== Batasang Pambansa (1978–1986) ===
Seat A					Seat B					Seat C					Seat D					Legislature	Constituency
Portrait	Member (Lifespan)	Term of office	Party	Electoral history	Portrait	Member (Lifespan)	Term of office	Party	Electoral history	Portrait	Member (Lifespan)	Term of office	Party	Electoral history	Portrait	Member (Lifespan)	Term of office	Party	Electoral history	Legislature	Constituency
District re-created February 1, 1984.
	Manuel Collantes (1917–2009)	June 30, 1984 – March 25, 1986	KBL	Elected in 1984.		Jose Laurel Jr. (1912–1998)	June 30, 1984 – March 25, 1986	UNIDO	Elected in 1984.		Hernando Perez (born 1939)	June 30, 1984 – March 25, 1986	Nacionalista	Elected in 1984.		Rafael Recto (1931–2008)	June 30, 1984 – March 25, 1986	Nacionalista	Elected in 1984.	Regular Batasang Pambansa	1984–1986; Agoncillo, Alitagtag, Balayan, Balete, Batangas City, Bauan, Calaca, Calatagan, Cuenca, Ibaan, Laurel, Lemery, Lian, Lipa, Lobo, Mabini, Malvar, Mataasnakahoy, Nasugbu, Padre Garcia, Rosario, San Jose, San Juan, San Luis, San Nicolas, San Pascual, Santa Teresita, Santo Tomas, Taal, Talisay, Tanauan, Taysan, Tingloy, Tuy
District dissolved into Batangas's 1st, 2nd, 3rd, and 4th districts for the House of Representatives.

== Election results ==
=== 1984 ===
1984 Philippine parliamentary election in Batangas
Party	Candidate	Votes	%
UNIDO	Jose Laurel Jr.	433,305	17.20
Nacionalista	Hernando Perez	254,173	10.09
KBL	Manuel Collantes	248,838	9.88
Nacionalista	Rafael Recto	236,601	9.39
Nacionalista	Tomas Apacible	187,202	7.43
KBL	Arturo Tanco	183,629	7.29
KBL	Roberto Diokno	180,006	7.15
KBL	Antonio Leviste	174,521	6.93
Independent	Hermilando Mandanas	156,905	6.23
KBL	Expedito Leviste	153,733	6.10
Nacionalista	Fernando Cabitac Sr.	149,885	5.95
Independent	Jose Julian Aliling	83,002	3.29
Independent	Maximiano Medalla	48,880	1.94
Independent	Edgardo Mendoza	23,911	0.95
Independent	Nemesio Valencia	3,001	0.12
Independent	Jose Dimayuga	1,554	0.06
