= 1963 Philippine House of Representatives special elections =

← 1961	November 12, 1963	1965 →

2 of 104 seats in the House of Representatives of the Philippines
	Majority party	Minority party
Party	Liberal	Nacionalista
Seats won	1	1
Seat change	▲1	▼1
Popular vote	48,326	44,847
Percentage	44.20%	41.02%

Two special elections (known as "by-elections" elsewhere) to the House of Representatives of the Philippines, the lower house of the Congress of the Philippines, were held on November 12, 1963, along with the 1963 Philippine Senate election. These were for vacancies in the 5th Congress of the Philippines for Batangas's 1st congressional district and Negros Occidental's 1st congressional district. The winners were to serve the rest of the term, which had ended on December 30, 1965. Political parties were allowed to field multiple candidates per district.

Just like the Senate election where the Nacionalista Party and the Liberal Party split even the disputed eight seats, both parties won one seat each; the Liberals picked up the Batangas seat, while the Nacionalistas held the Negros Occidental seat.

== Electoral system ==
All seats in the House of Representatives were elected from single member districts, under the first-past-the-post voting system. Under the Revised Election Code, when a seat becomes vacant prior to ten months before the general election, the president, as soon as he is notified by the chamber where the vacancy occurred, shall call a special election.

The following seats were up for election:

- Batangas's 1st congressional district
- Negros Occidental's 1st congressional district

== Special elections ==
Party	Votes	%	Seats
Liberal Party	48,326	44.20	1
Nacionalista Party	44,847	41.02	1
Liberal Party (independent)	186	0.17	0
Independent	9,593	8.77	0
No party indicated	6,379	5.83	0
Total	109,331	100.00	2

=== Batangas ===
Incumbent Apolinario Apacible died in office, necessating a special election. Apacible had won four consecutive elections prior to his death. His brother Quirino was one of the candidates of the Nacionalista Party.

1963 Batangas's 1st congressional district special election
Candidate	Party	Votes	%
Luis N. Lopez	Liberal Party	16,023	31.20
Manuel Serrano	Independent	9,459	18.42
Quirino Apacible	Nacionalista Party	8,779	17.09
Arsenio Cabrera	No party indicated	5,721	11.14
Ceferino Inciong	Liberal Party	5,507	10.72
Pedro Belmi	Nacionalista Party	4,040	7.87
Ramon Limioco	Nacionalista Party	1,177	2.29
Orlando Macabuhay	No party indicated	658	1.28
Total		51,364	100.00
Liberal Party gain from Nacionalista Party			
Source: COMELEC (1965)

=== Negros Occidental ===
Incumbent Vicente Gustilo Sr. died in office, necessating a special election. Gustillo won in 1957, then defended it on 1961, before dying in 1962. His son Armando was the Nacionalista candidate.

1963 Negros Occidental's 1st congressional district special election
Candidate	Party	Votes	%
Armando Gustillo	Nacionalista Party	30,851	53.22
Ramon Lacson	Liberal Party	26,796	46.23
Nic Garces	Liberal Party (independent)	186	0.32
Conrado Lobaton	Independent	134	0.23
Total		57,967	100.00
Nacionalista Party hold			
Source: COMELEC (1965)

== Aftermath ==
The winners of these special elections were known to be connected to the sugar industry.

In Batangas, the Nacionalistas wrestled back the seat under Federico Serrano, son of Felixberto Serrano, who won the 1965 general election. He was then succeeded by Roberto Diokno in 1969, who then held the seat until the proclamation of martial law in 1972.

In Negros Occidental, Armando Gustillo held the seat until the proclamation of martial law in 1972.
