= Br. Alfred Shields FSC Marine Biological Station =

Marine laboratory in Batangas, Philippines

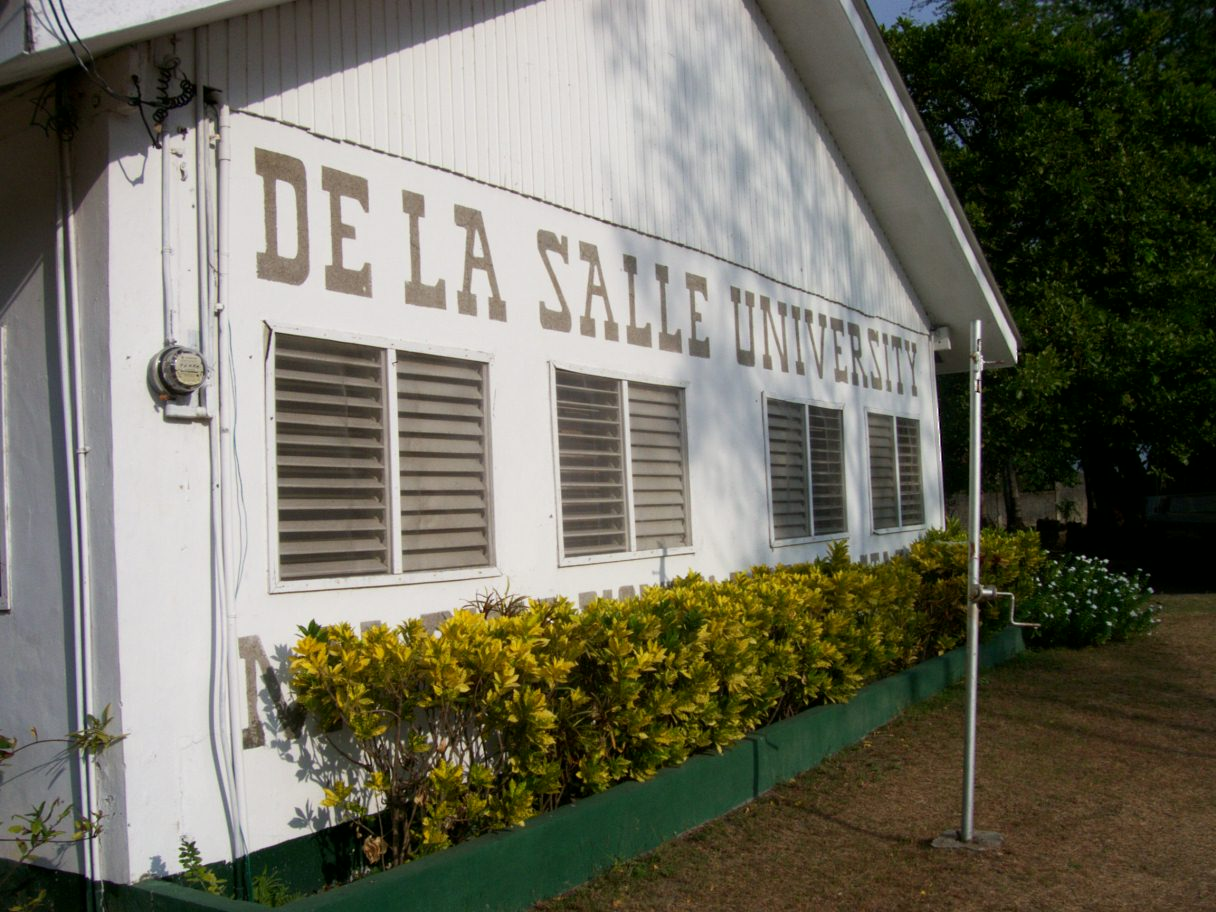
The Br. Alfred Shields FSC Marine Biological Station

The Br. Alfred Shields FSC Marine Biological Station is the marine laboratory of De La Salle University. It is located in Sitio Matuod, Lian, Batangas near Talim Bay and also near Mt. Tikbalang. Most of undergraduate and graduate thesis/researches on marine science of the university are done in this facility. Dr. Wilfredo Roehl Y. Licuanan is the current director of the Station.

== History ==
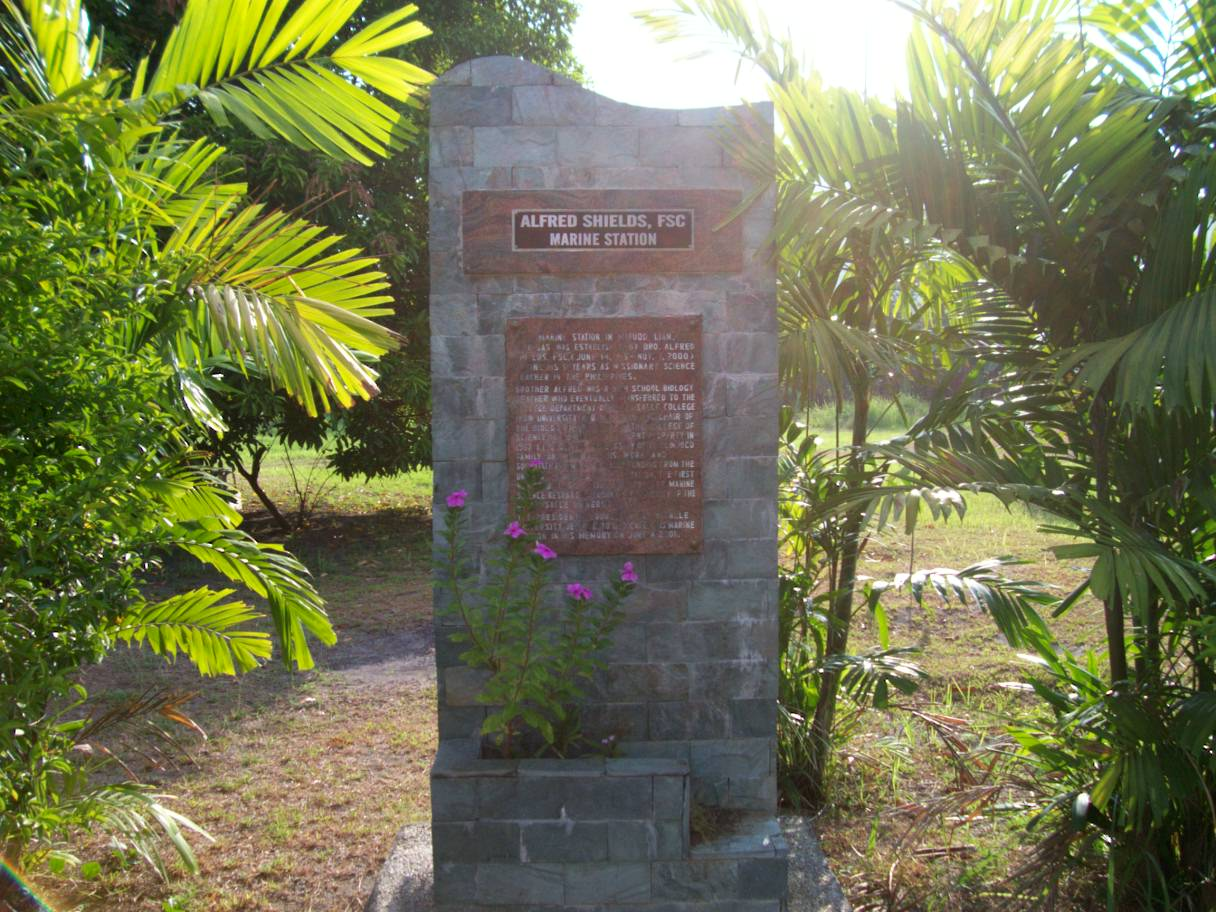
MBS Marker

Mt. Tikbalang

Talim Point

The marine station was named after Br. Alfred Shields FSC, the founder of DLSU's Biology Department. The land where the station is now located was donated by the Limjoco Family. The Marine Station is in the Municipality of Lian in Batangas, a province in the Southern part of Luzon. The Marine Station is near Talim Bay. It is also near a hill, Mt. Tikbalang.

== Facilities ==
The station has basic laboratory and field facilities. These include SCUBA diving gear, tanks, and compressors as well as snorkels and masks; A small outrigger boat, a dry laboratory, reference collections of common marine organisms, computers and various communications and video equipment. Basic housing facilities for faculty and students are also available including two 10-bed dormitory rooms, and a small kitchen. Freshwater supply is provided from a deep well and a generator is available for emergency power.

== Faculty and students ==
A resident scientist (a faculty member of the Biology Department of the university) may be available to supervise and assist in the day-to-day activities of the station. Common users over the past year are faculty and students of the Departments of Biology and Chemistry, as well as natural science students from De La Salle University-Dasmariñas, University of Santo Tomas, University of the Philippines, and the Ateneo de Manila University.

== Research and outreach ==
Sunday School for Turtle Patrol Kids

Turtle rescue area

Recent research and outreach activities conducted by the MBS include: a marine resource assessment of Cauayan, Negros Occidental, evaluation of coral reef conservation at Maricaban Strait, and various undergraduate and graduate theses on coral recruitment, competition and bleaching.

The university's Center for Social Concern and Action (COSCA) together with the Council of Student Organizations (CSO) organizes an annual mangrove tree planting activity within the station's area.

== The Turtle Patrol ==
The MBS also helps educate the locals on how to save turtles (locally known as pawikans) which are sighted within the vicinity. The turtles are usually sighted in the area laying their eggs. The MBS educates the people not to eat the turtles or sell the eggs but instead protect them. With the help of some NGO's and some concerned citizens, local children are trained to be part of Turtle Patrols. Every Sunday, the station becomes a school for local kids, the Turtle Patrol Kids.

The university is in the process of getting a permit from the Department of Environment and Natural Resources to make the Marine Station a Turtle Rescue Center. The Turtle Rescue Center, when given the permit, will be a place where people can turnover turtles which were caught in unusual places or turtles which were caught sick. It will be a place where the turtles can stay until they are ready to be released back to the sea.
