= Citicore Solar Batangas 1 =

Solar power plant in Batangas, Philippines

- Country: Philippines
- Location: Tuy, Batangas
- Status: Operational
- Commission date: September 2025
- Owner: Citicore Solar Batangas 1, Inc.

Solar farm
- Type: Flat-panel PV

Power generation
- Nameplate capacity: 197 MW

Citicore Solar (CS) Batangas 1 is a 197-megawatt (MW) photovoltaic power station in Tuy, Batangas, Philippines.

== History ==
On September 15, 2025, the Citicore Solar Batangas 1 was inaugurated in a ceremony led by President Bongbong Marcos.

== Facilities ==
CS Batangas 1 has as 197-megawatt (MW) capacity solar power plant and a 320-MW-hour battery energy storage system (BESS). It is the first baseload-capable solar station meaning it could store and deliver electricity beyond the typical solar hours. It has a baseload of 50-MW and is connected to the national grid. CS Batangas 1 is also agrisolar which means that the land the photovoltaic facility is also simultaneously used to grow crops.

== Management ==
The facility is run by Citicore Renewable Energy Corp. (CREC) through its subsidiary Citicore Solar Batangas 1, Inc.
