= Salong =

Salong may refer to:

- Salong, Micronesia
- MV Salong, a coaster
- Salong, a barangay of the Municipality of Calaca, Batangas, Philippines
