= Felixberto Serrano =

Filipino politician and diplomat (1906-1990)

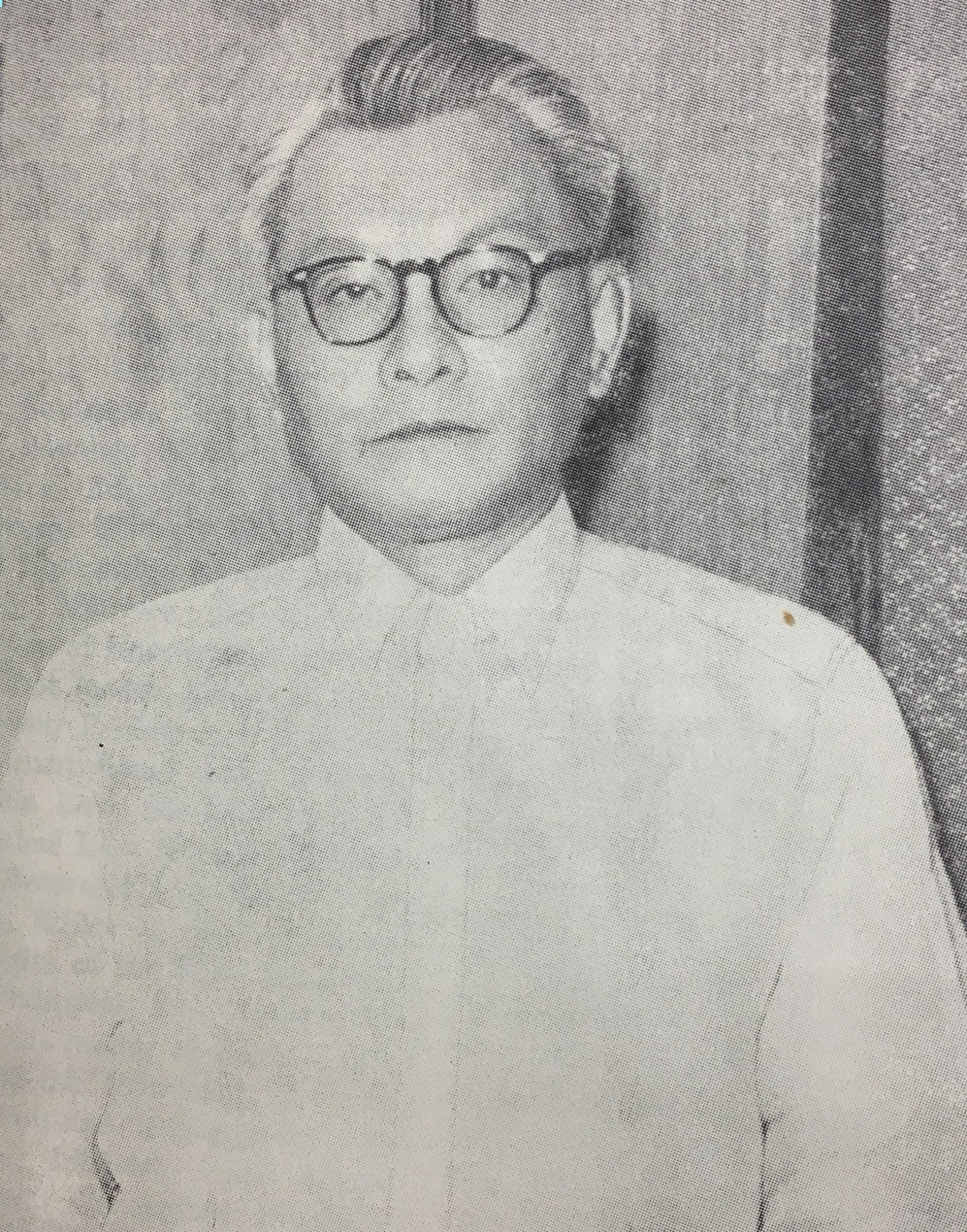
- Serrano in 1959

Secretary of Foreign Affairs
- In office 22 August 1957 – 30 December 1961
- Preceded by: Carlos P. Garcia
- Succeeded by: Emmanuel Pelaez

Permanent Representative of the Philippines to the United Nations
- In office 1954–1957
- Preceded by: Carlos P. Romulo
- Succeeded by: Francisco Afan Delgado

Member of the Philippine House of Representatives from Batangas's 1st district
- In office 9 June 1945 – 30 December 1949
- Preceded by: Miguel Tolentino
- Succeeded by: Apolinario Apacible

Personal details
- Born: Felixberto Maraña Serrano; 22 August 1906 Lemery, Batangas, Philippine Islands
- Died: 12 October 1990 (aged 84)
- Party: Nacionalista

Felixberto Maraña Serrano (22 August 1906 – 12 October 1990) was a Filipino politician and diplomat. Serrano was the secretary of foreign affairs under President Carlos P. Garcia from 1957 to 1961. Previously, he was the permanent representative of the Philippines to the United Nations from 1954 to 1957 and a member of the Philippine House of Representatives from 1945 to 1949, representing the 1st district of Batangas.

Serrano was a delegate to the 1971 Philippine Constitutional Convention and made a speech just before the balloting for candidates for president of the convention accusing other delegates of taking bribes to favour Marcos's intentions in the convention.

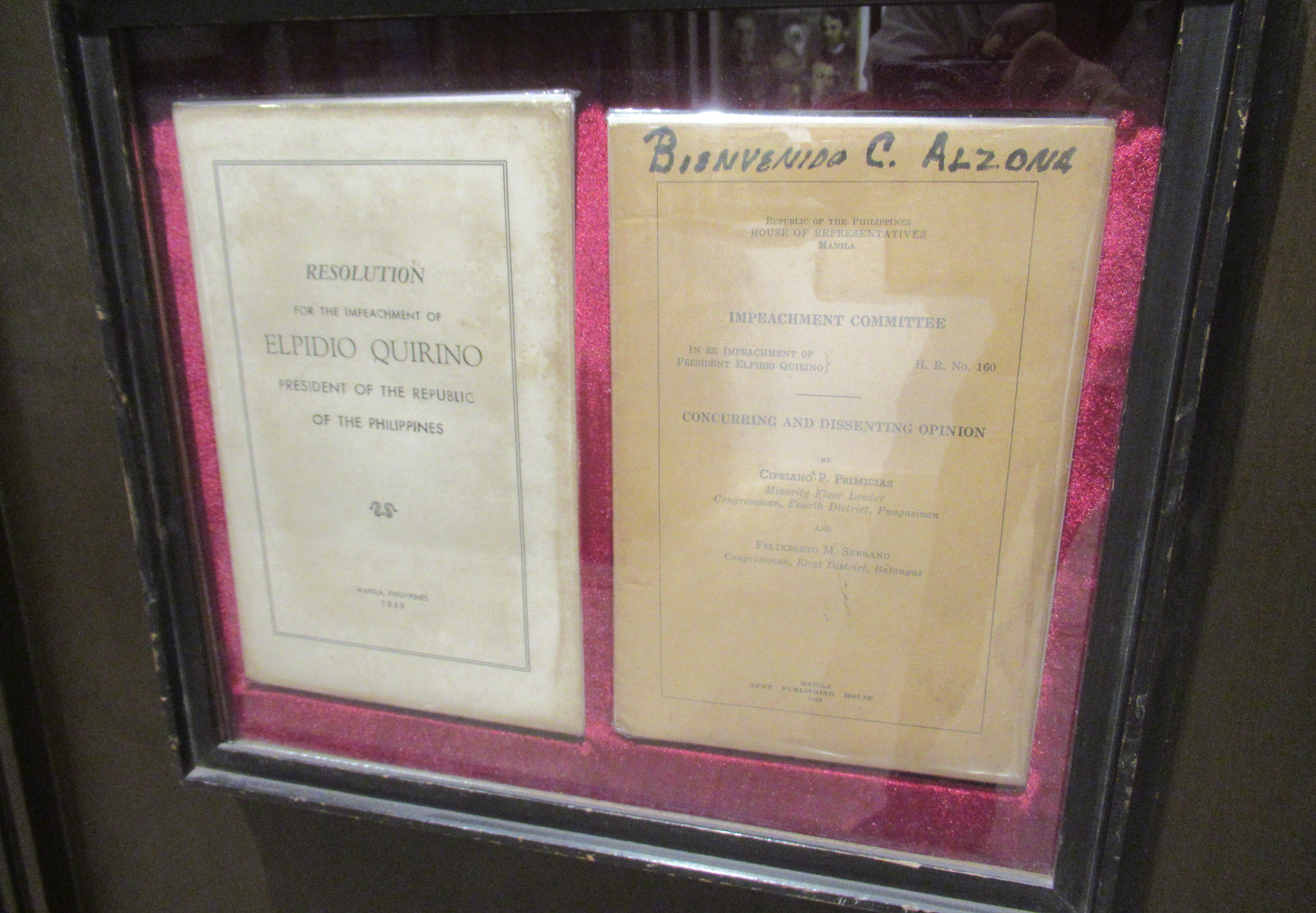
Serrano in Quirino Impeachment

== Sources ==
- Augusto Fauni Espiritu. Five Faces of Exile: The Nation and Filipino American Intellectuals. Stanford University Press, 2005. p. 213.
- Teofisto Guignona Fight for the Filipino. Palm Springs, California: Kenneth Mills, 2013. p. 86-90.
