= Tuy, Batangas =

Municipality in Batangas, Philippines

Tuy
- Municipality
- Municipality of Tuy
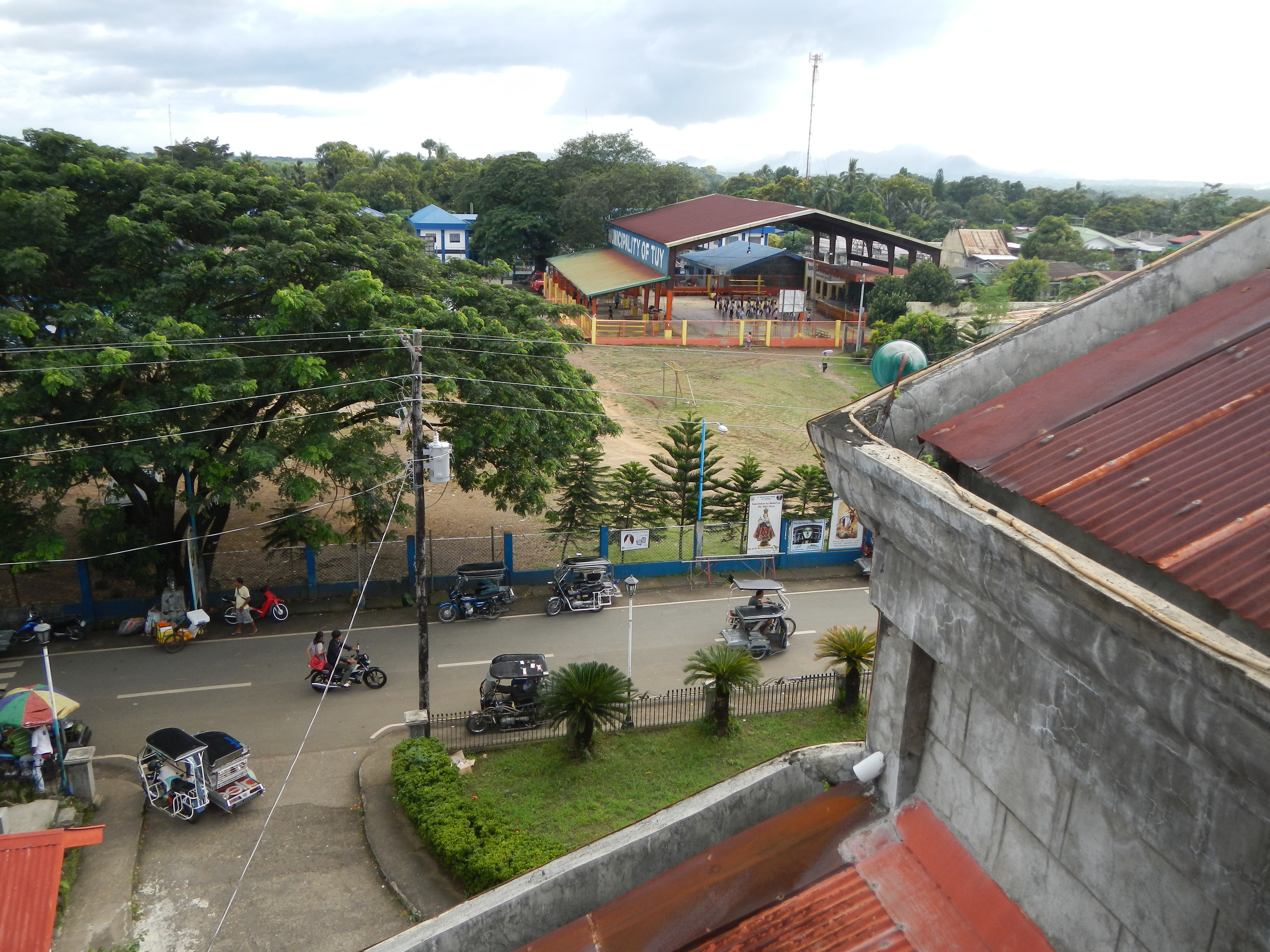
- View of Tuy

- Seal

- Map of Batangas with Tuy highlighted
- Interactive map of Tuy
- Location within the Philippines
- Coordinates: 14°01′N 120°44′E
- Country: Philippines
- Region: Calabarzon
- Province: Batangas
- District: 1st district
- Founded: August 12, 1866
- Annexation to Balayan: March 28, 1903
- Reestablished: January 1, 1911
- Named for: Tui, Pontevedra, Galicia, Spain
- Barangays: 22 (see Barangays)

Government
  - Type: Sangguniang Bayan
  - Mayor: Jose Jecerell C. Cerrado
  - Vice Mayor: Armando P. Afable
  - Representative: Leandro Antonio L. Leviste
  - Municipal Council: Members: Roselio F. Bacalcal; Randoll I. Catapang; Rafael D. Bautista; Jerome B. Patulot; Eduardo P. Afable Jr.; Adrian C. Perez; Modesto P. Barangas; Kim Ysabelle C. Mercado
  - Electorate: 31,097 voters (2025)

Area
  - Total: 94.65 km^{2} (36.54 sq mi)
- Elevation: 143 m (469 ft)
- Highest elevation: 779 m (2,556 ft)
- Lowest elevation: 5 m (16 ft)

Population (2024 census)
  - Total: 47,199
  - Density: 498.7/km^{2} (1,292/sq mi)
  - Households: 11,448

Economy
  - Income class: 2nd municipal income class
  - Poverty incidence: 9.03% (2023)
  - Revenue: ₱ 224.9 million (2024)
  - Assets: ₱ 565 million (2024)
  - Expenditure: ₱ 94.2 million (2024)
  - Liabilities: ₱ 114.3 million (2024)

Service provider
  - Electricity: Batangas 1 Electric Cooperative (BATELEC 1)
- Time zone: UTC+8 (PST)
- ZIP code: 4214
- PSGC: 0401034000
- IDD : area code: +63 (0)43
- Native languages: Tagalog

Tuy (Tagalog pronunciation: [tuˈi]), officially the Municipality of Tuy (Tagalog: Bayan ng Tuy), is a municipality in the province of Batangas, Philippines. According to the 2024 census, it has a population of 47,199 people.

The patron of Tuy is Saint Vincent Ferrer, the patron of construction workers, whose feast day is celebrated on May 8.

Tuy has been producing bakery products of its own, like the jacobina biscuits and biscocho toasted bread, among other bakery products, since the 1960s.

== Etymology ==
The name "Tuy" was given by Salvador Ellio, the alcalde mayor of Batangas, in memory of his birthplace – Tui in the province of Pontevedra in Galicia, Spain.

== History ==
Tuy was historically part of the town of Balayan, the former capital of the eponymous province (now Batangas) from 1597 to 1732. It became an independent town on August 12, 1866. It was then returned to Balayan, this time under temporary governance, from 1903 to 1911.

In 2001, Cesar Platon, a Batangas gubernatorial candidate and the then-mayor of Tanauan, was assassinated at Tuy's town plaza while he was campaigning.

== Geography ==
Tuy is located at 14°01′N 120°44′E. It is 56 kilometers (35 mi) from Batangas City, 98 kilometers (61 mi) from Manila, and 39 kilometers (24 mi) from Tagaytay.

Tuy is located between Balayan, Lian and Nasugbu. It is also situated between 2 rivers: in the north, Tuy town proper's boundary is the Mataywanac/Salipit River, while in the south, the Tuy town proper's boundary is the Obispo River.

According to the Philippine Statistics Authority, the municipality has a land area of 94.65 square kilometers (36.54 sq mi) constituting 3.03% of the 3,119.75-square-kilometer (1,204.54 sq mi) total area of Batangas.

=== Barangays ===
Tuy is politically subdivided into 22 barangays, as shown in the matrix below. Each barangay consists of puroks and some have sitios.

PSGC	Barangay	Population			±% p.a.	
		2024		2010		
041034001	Acle	2.4%	1,131	1,022	▴	0.70%
041034002	Bayudbud	4.3%	2,047	2,081	▾	−0.11%
041034003	Bolboc	5.5%	2,595	2,334	▴	0.74%
041034004	Dalima	2.6%	1,227	1,089	▴	0.83%
041034005	Dao	3.4%	1,601	1,448	▴	0.70%
041034006	Guinhawa	4.9%	2,305	2,379	▾	−0.22%
041034007	Lumbangan	3.4%	1,613	1,547	▴	0.29%
041034008	Luntal	6.5%	3,066	2,528	▴	1.35%
041034009	Magahis	7.1%	3,351	3,082	▴	0.58%
041034010	Malibu	2.8%	1,345	1,286	▴	0.31%
041034011	Mataywanac	4.7%	2,233	2,213	▴	0.06%
041034012	Palincaro	3.7%	1,730	1,653	▴	0.32%
041034013	Luna (Poblacion)	5.0%	2,358	2,032	▴	1.04%
041034014	Burgos (Poblacion)	1.3%	598	572	▴	0.31%
041034015	Rizal (Poblacion)	2.3%	1,091	1,144	▾	−0.33%
041034016	Rillo (Poblacion)	4.4%	2,085	1,818	▴	0.95%
041034017	Putol	6.2%	2,949	2,812	▴	0.33%
041034018	Sabang	7.0%	3,292	2,789	▴	1.16%
041034019	San Jose	4.0%	1,870	1,740	▴	0.50%
041034021	Talon	2.6%	1,245	1,240	▴	0.03%
041034022	Toong	5.3%	2,510	2,460	▴	0.14%
041034023	Tuyon‑tuyon	3.2%	1,501	1,465	▴	0.17%
	Total		47,199	40,734	▴	1.03%

=== Climate ===
Climate data for Tuy, Batangas
Month	Jan	Feb	Mar	Apr	May	Jun	Jul	Aug	Sep	Oct	Nov	Dec	Year
Mean daily maximum °C (°F)	28 (82)	29 (84)	31 (88)	33 (91)	31 (88)	30 (86)	29 (84)	28 (82)	28 (82)	29 (84)	29 (84)	28 (82)	29 (85)
Mean daily minimum °C (°F)	19 (66)	19 (66)	20 (68)	22 (72)	24 (75)	24 (75)	24 (75)	24 (75)	24 (75)	23 (73)	21 (70)	20 (68)	22 (72)
Average precipitation mm (inches)	11 (0.4)	13 (0.5)	14 (0.6)	32 (1.3)	101 (4.0)	142 (5.6)	208 (8.2)	187 (7.4)	175 (6.9)	131 (5.2)	68 (2.7)	39 (1.5)	1,121 (44.3)
Average rainy days	5.2	5.0	7.4	11.5	19.8	23.5	27.0	25.9	25.2	23.2	15.5	8.3	197.5
Source: Meteoblue

== Demographics ==
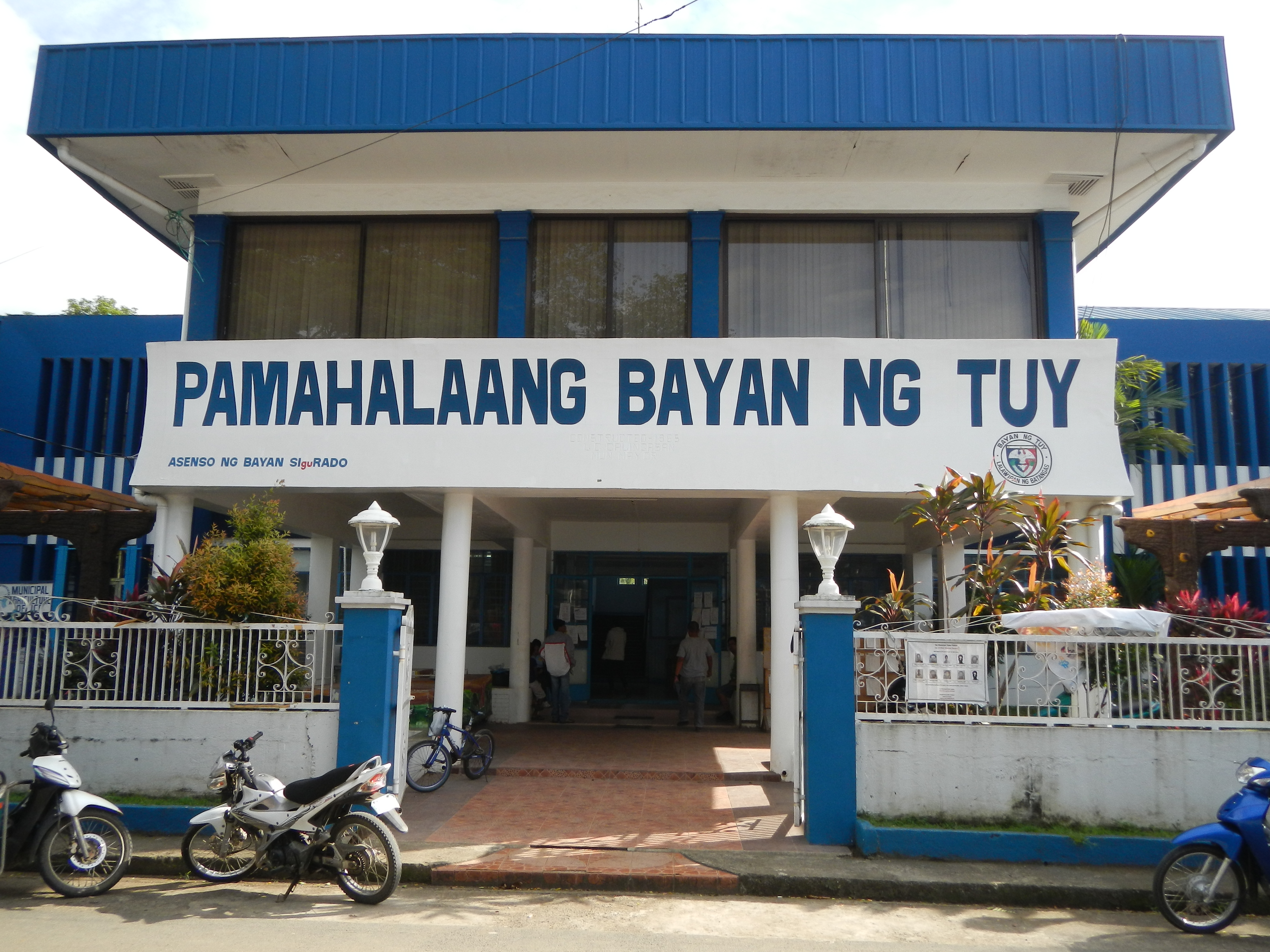
Municipal hall

Population census of Tuy
Year	Pop.	±% p.a.
1903	2,340	—
1918	5,847	+6.30%
1939	7,767	+1.36%
1948	10,097	+2.96%
1960	14,012	+2.77%
1970	19,562	+3.39%
1975	21,839	+2.23%
1980	25,070	+2.80%
1990	30,409	+1.95%
1995	32,447	+1.22%
2000	35,672	+2.05%
2007	40,290	+1.69%
2010	40,734	+0.40%
2015	43,743	+1.37%
2020	46,519	+1.30%
2024	47,199	+0.35%
Source: Philippine Statistics Authority

In the 2024 census, Tuy had a population of 47,199 people. The population density was 500 inhabitants per square kilometer (1,300/sq mi).

=== Languages ===
Tagalog is the local language in the Batangueño dialect. Today, all are bilingual between English and Tagalog in all households. English is also spoken, which is included in its educational curriculum and is often used in business and government.

=== Religion ===
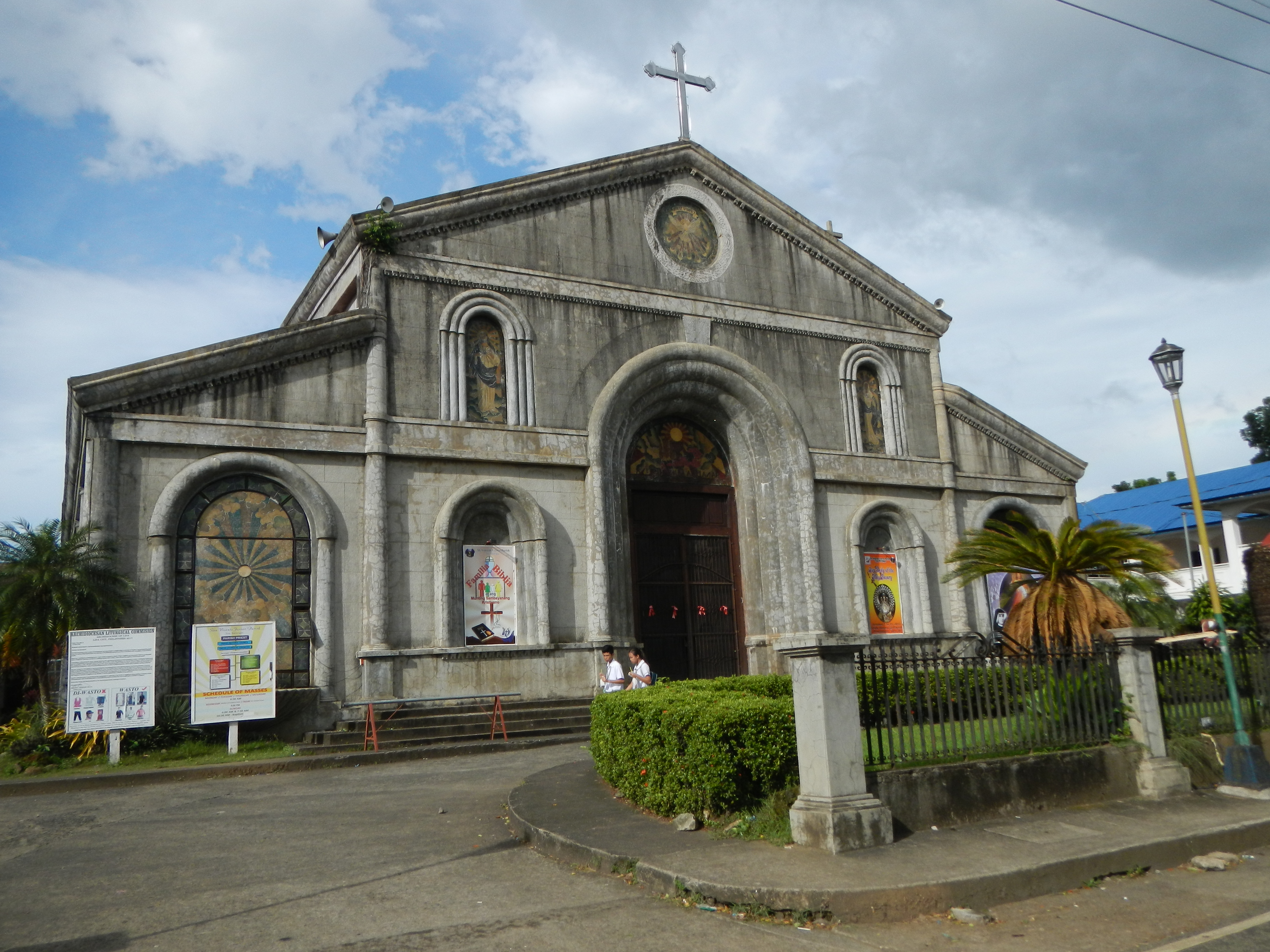
Saint Vincent Ferrer Parish Church

A vast majority of inhabitants are Roman Catholics, though portions of the population are affiliated with other Christian denominations such as evangelicals, Baptists, Jehovah's Witnesses, Adventists, and Church of Christ movements. There are five Iglesia ni Cristo chapels in Tuy, known as Guinhawa, Tuy, Sabang, Acle and Silangan.

== Economy ==
Poverty incidence of Tuy (%)

Source: Philippine Statistics Authority

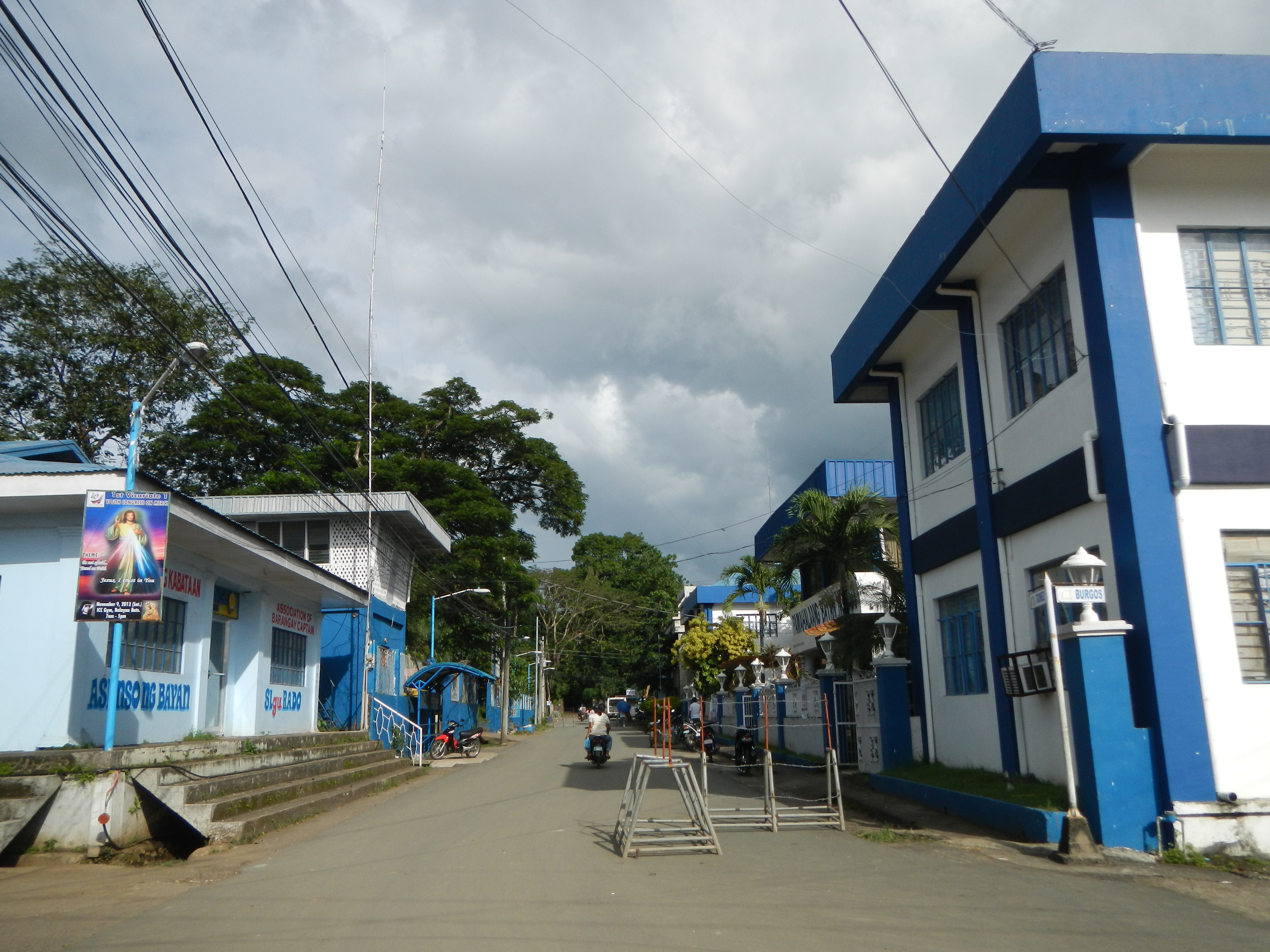
Downtown Tuy

The primary income source of people from Tuy are through agricultural lands like sugarcane farms. Sugarcane harvests in Tuy are usually processed in neighboring towns' factories like Nasugbu and Balayan sporting lower income base in the town of Tuy.

Some also depend on poultry, livestock, and other crops. Most of the population are unemployed or either migrating once employed due to absence of real high-paying job opportunities in its vicinity.

=== Natural resources ===
Natural resources available in Tuy include sand, gravel, earth, construction materials, and timber. Sand, earth, & construction materials are found in some rivers with potential quarrying resources, especially riverbanks and watersheds. These are the Tuyon-Tuyon, Palico, Munting Tubig, Kaytitinga, Bayudbud and Molino rivers.

Quarrying of earth is found in hills and mountains while quarrying of rocks is found in Barangay San Jose. Timber is found in the forested areas – portions of Barangays Dalima, Talon, Palincaro, Malibu, Toong, Magahis, and San Jose.

=== Major agricultural activities/crops ===
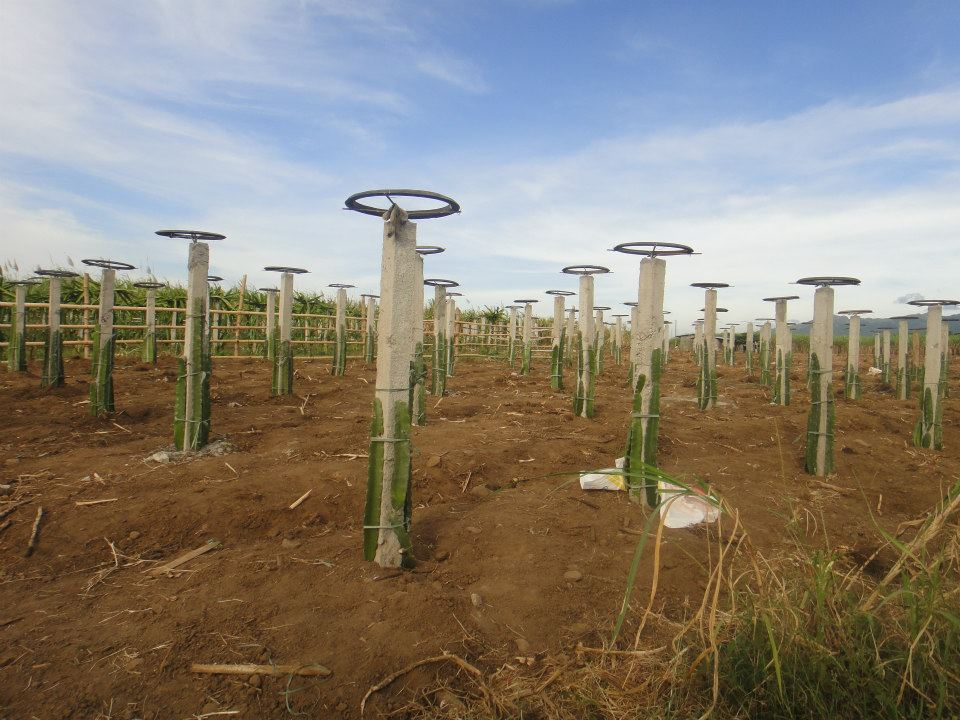
A sugarcane plantation in Tuy

Sugarcane is the major crop, which produces about more than 30,000 metric tons (30,000 long tons; 33,000 short tons) of sugar per milling season. Milling starts during the month of December and usually ends by June of the following year. Land cultivation of sugarcane farms is on a tenancy basis hereby the tenants share 50% of the production cost and obtains 50% of the income. Sugar is harvested, hauled and brought to the nearby sugar milling companies in the towns of Balayan and Nasugbu. Sugarcane farming is thus the main source of livelihood of the people. It also provides employment for cane cutters, weepers, and haulers who are paid either on a daily or per tone of cane basis.

Other major commercial crops are mango (mainly the Indian variety), and cassava. Fruit-bearing trees and vegetable crops are also planted in the fields, backyards, and home gardens to supply household demands, and augment income.

== Festivals ==
Tuy's original festival was the Salagubang (a kind of root and leaf-eating beetle) Festival. This celebration, however, was discontinued and eventually so replaced due to obvious acceptability reasons by the annual Kambingan (goats and their by-products) Festival.

The Kambingan Festival is the local way of honoring their town, and a town plaza night food market where people can buy foods and enjoy free Internet surfing thru Wi-Fi connection.

Inhabitants also celebrate the Mamang-os (sugar cane) Festival for having a good harvest of sugarcane every year.

== Infrastructure ==
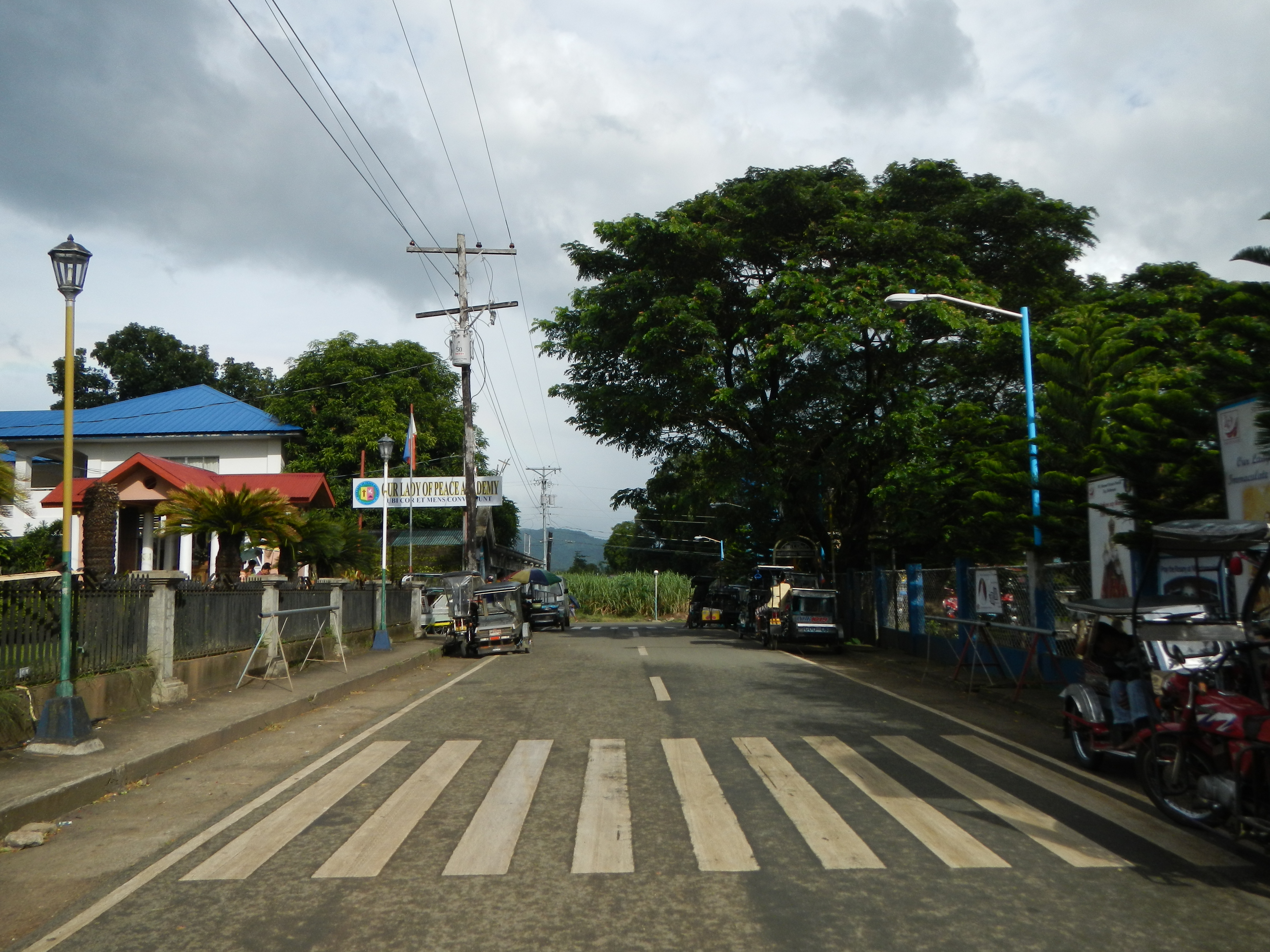
A street in downtown Tuy

=== Transportation ===
Land transportation facilities are available in the municipality like public utility jeepneys, light vehicles, trucks, motorcycles, buses, tricycles, trailers, & heavy trucks. Public utility jeepneys are the dominant land transports plying the Balayan-Tuy-Nasugbu routes and vice versa. Tricycles are the most used public utility that serve the population in different barangays of the municipality. Buses also link the town to Metro Manila and Batangas City.

==== Bridges ====
Tuy has eight bridges, all of which are constructed of concrete. Of these eight bridges, six are national, while the other two are provincial.

=== Communication ===
The municipality has three telephone systems, as of 2011. One is being operated by Western Batangas Telecommunication System, the other by Digitel, and the other by Globe. A telegraph office dispatches messages thru telegrams. Its office is located at the ground floor of the municipal building together with the post office with one post master, one mail sorter, and two letter carriers who serve the municipality.

As of 2021, cell phones use keep on spreading, as well as the internet connectivities that the same cell phone service providers offer, namely Globe, PLDT/Smart, and DITO among other telecommunication companies.

== Education ==
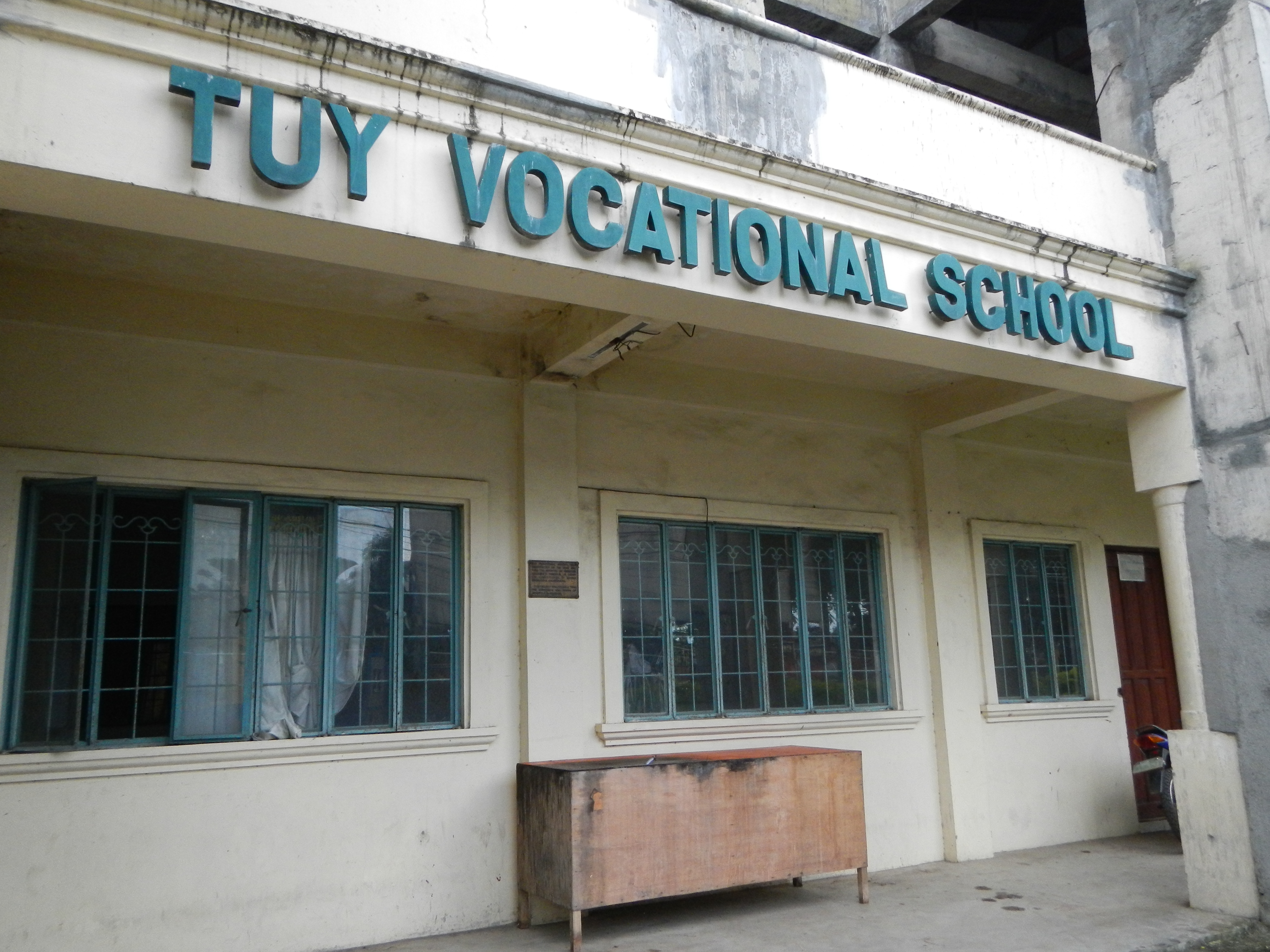
Tuy Vocational School

The Tuy Schools District Office governs all educational institutions within the municipality. It oversees the management and operations of all private and public, from primary to secondary schools.

There are 3 secondary level schools, mainly Jose Lopez Manzano Tuy National High School, Our Lady of Peace Academy, Bolboc National High School, Talon Family Farm School, Tuy National High School, I.B. Calingasan Memorial Institute, and Santiago de Guzman National High School.

There are also numerous elementary and pre-elementary schools in Tuy, aside from the ones built mainly for each barangay.

=== Primary and elementary schools ===
- Bayudbud Elementary School
- Bolbok Elementary School
- Casamarra School of Learning
- Dalima Elementary School
- Dao Elementary School
- Eulogio G. Cerrado Elementary School
- Gregorio Agoncillo Elementary School
- Gregorio Paradero Elementary School
- Guinhawa Elementary School
- Gumapac Barangay School
- Jose Zabarte Elementary School
- Julian Castillo Memorial Elementary School
- Lumbangan-Talon Elementary School
- Luntal Elementary School
- Magahis Elementary School
- Mataywanak Elementary School
- San Jose Elementary School
- Santiago De Guzman Elementary School
- Toong Elementary School

=== Secondary schools ===
- Bolbok National High School
- GHLC Tuy
- Jose Lopez Manzano National High School
- Maria Paz Fronda National High School
- Tuy National High School
- Tuy Senior High School

=== Higher educational institution ===
- Dr. Francisco L. Calingasan Memorial Colleges Foundation

== Media ==
Newspapers, magazines, comics, and other periodicals available in the National Capital Region (NCR) reach the municipality, physically, and online through the internet, including those available internationally. Likewise, radio, television sets, computer gadgets, and the like in the locality have receptions of the programs aired in the mass media, and provided on the internet.

== Notable people ==
- Raul Bacalzo, former Chief of the Philippine National Police
