= Batangas's 1st congressional district =

House of Representatives of the Philippines legislative district

- Constituency for the House of Representatives of the Philippines
- Map Boundary of Batangas's 1st congressional district.
- Location of Batangas within the Philippines
- Province: Batangas
- Region: Calabarzon
- Population: 635,962 (2020)
- Electorate: 393,786 (2022)
- Major settlements: 8 LGUs: Cities; Calaca; Municipalities; Balayan; Calatagan; Lemery; Lian; Nasugbu; Taal; Tuy
- Area: 924.83 km^{2} (357.08 sq mi)

Current constituency
- Created: 1907
- Representative: Leandro Antonio L. Leviste
- Political party: Lakas
- Congressional bloc: Majority

Batangas's 1st congressional district is one of the six congressional districts of the Philippines in the province of Batangas. It has been represented in the House of Representatives of the Philippines since 1916 and earlier in the Philippine Assembly from 1907 to 1916. The district consists of the western Batangas municipalities of Balayan, Calatagan, Lemery, Lian, Nasugbu, Taal and Tuy and the component city of Calaca. It is currently represented in the 20th Congress by Leandro Antonio L. Leviste.

Prior to its second dissolution in 1972, the first district encompassed the western Batangas municipalities of Agoncillo, Balayan, Calaca, Calatagan, Lemery, Lian, Nasugbu, San Luis, San Nicolas, Santa Teresita, Taal, and Tuy. Tanauan was also a part of the district until it was reapportioned to the third district in 1928. Following the restoration of the Congress in 1987, it was reduced to eight municipalities that currently remain within its jurisdiction, while four other municipalities were reapportioned to the second and third districts, respectively.

== Representation history ==
#	Image	Member	Term of office		Legislature	Party	Electoral history	Constituent LGUs
#	Image	Member	Start	End	Legislature	Party	Electoral history	Constituent LGUs
=== Batangas's 1st district for the Philippine Assembly ===
District created January 9, 1907.
1		Felipe Agoncillo	October 16, 1907	October 16, 1909	1st	Independent	Elected in 1907.	1907–1912; Balayan, Calaca, Lemery, Nasugbu, Taal, Talisay, Tanauan
2		Galicano Apacible	October 16, 1909	October 16, 1916	2nd	Nacionalista	Elected in 1909.	1907–1912; Balayan, Calaca, Lemery, Nasugbu, Taal, Talisay, Tanauan
2		Galicano Apacible	October 16, 1909	October 16, 1916	3rd	Nacionalista	Re-elected in 1912.	1912–1916; Balayan, Calaca, Calatagan, Lemery, Nasugbu, Taal, Talisay, Tanauan, Tuy
=== Batangas's 1st district for the House of Representatives of the Philippine Islands ===
3		Ramón Diokno	October 16, 1916	June 3, 1919	4th	Nacionalista	Elected in 1916.	1916–1919; Balayan, Calaca, Calatagan, Lemery, Lian, Nasugbu, Taal, Talisay, Tanauan, Tuy
4		Vicente Lontoc	June 3, 1919	June 6, 1922	5th	Nacionalista	Elected in 1919.	1919–1928; Balayan, Calaca, Calatagan, Lemery, Lian, Nasugbu, San Luis, Taal, Talisay, Tanauan, Tuy
5		Antonio de las Alas	June 6, 1922	February 18, 1933	6th	Nacionalista; Colectivista	Elected in 1922.	1919–1928; Balayan, Calaca, Calatagan, Lemery, Lian, Nasugbu, San Luis, Taal, Talisay, Tanauan, Tuy
5		Antonio de las Alas	June 6, 1922	February 18, 1933	7th	Nacionalista; Consolidado	Re-elected in 1925.	1919–1928; Balayan, Calaca, Calatagan, Lemery, Lian, Nasugbu, San Luis, Taal, Talisay, Tanauan, Tuy
5		Antonio de las Alas	June 6, 1922	February 18, 1933	8th	Nacionalista; Consolidado	Re-elected in 1928.	1928–1935; Balayan, Calaca, Calatagan, Lemery, Lian, Nasugbu, San Luis, Taal, Tuy
5		Antonio de las Alas	June 6, 1922	February 18, 1933	9th	Nacionalista; Consolidado	Re-elected in 1931. Resigned on appointment as Secretary of Public Works and Communications.	1928–1935; Balayan, Calaca, Calatagan, Lemery, Lian, Nasugbu, San Luis, Taal, Tuy
(3)		Ramón Diokno	February 18, 1933	September 16, 1935	9th	Nacionalista; Consolidado	Elected in 1933 to finish de las Alas's term.	1928–1935; Balayan, Calaca, Calatagan, Lemery, Lian, Nasugbu, San Luis, Taal, Tuy
(3)		Ramón Diokno	February 18, 1933	September 16, 1935	10th	Nacionalista; Democrático	Re-elected in 1934.	1928–1935; Balayan, Calaca, Calatagan, Lemery, Lian, Nasugbu, San Luis, Taal, Tuy
#	Image	Member	Term of office		National Assembly	Party	Electoral history	Constituent LGUs
#	Image	Member	Start	End	National Assembly	Party	Electoral history	Constituent LGUs
=== Batangas's 1st district for the National Assembly (Commonwealth of the Philippines) ===
6		Natalio López	September 16, 1935	October 26, 1936	1st	Nacionalista; Demócrata Pro-Independencia	Elected in 1935. Election annulled by electoral commission.	1935–1941; Balayan, Calaca, Calatagan, Lemery, Lian, Nasugbu, San Luis, Taal, Tuy
7		Miguel Tolentino	October 26, 1936	December 30, 1941	1st	Nacionalista; Demócrata Pro-Independencia	Declared winner of 1935 elections.	1935–1941; Balayan, Calaca, Calatagan, Lemery, Lian, Nasugbu, San Luis, Taal, Tuy
7		Miguel Tolentino	October 26, 1936	December 30, 1941	2nd	Nacionalista	Re-elected in 1938.	1935–1941; Balayan, Calaca, Calatagan, Lemery, Lian, Nasugbu, San Luis, Taal, Tuy
District dissolved into the two-seat Batangas's at-large district for the National Assembly (Second Philippine Republic).
#	Image	Member	Term of office		Common wealth Congress	Party	Electoral history	Constituent LGUs
#	Image	Member	Start	End	Common wealth Congress	Party	Electoral history	Constituent LGUs
=== Batangas's 1st district for the House of Representatives of the Commonwealth of the Philippines ===
District re-created May 24, 1945.
8		Felixberto Serrano	June 9, 1945	May 25, 1946	1st	Nacionalista	Elected in 1941.	1945–1946; Balayan, Calaca, Calatagan, Lemery, Lian, Nasugbu, San Luis, Taal, Tuy
#	Image	Member	Term of office		Congress	Party	Electoral history	Constituent LGUs
#	Image	Member	Start	End	Congress	Party	Electoral history	Constituent LGUs
=== Batangas's 1st district for the House of Representatives of the Philippines ===
(8)		Felixberto Serrano	May 25, 1946	December 30, 1949	1st	Nacionalista	Re-elected in 1946.	1946–1949; Balayan, Calaca, Calatagan, Lemery, Lian, Nasugbu, San Luis, Taal, Tuy
9		Apolinario R. Apacible	December 30, 1949	August 22, 1963	2nd	Nacionalista	Elected in 1949.	1949–1957; Agoncillo, Balayan, Calaca, Calatagan, Lemery, Lian, Nasugbu, San Luis, Taal, Tuy
9		Apolinario R. Apacible	December 30, 1949	August 22, 1963	3rd	Nacionalista	Re-elected in 1953.	1949–1957; Agoncillo, Balayan, Calaca, Calatagan, Lemery, Lian, Nasugbu, San Luis, Taal, Tuy
9		Apolinario R. Apacible	December 30, 1949	August 22, 1963	4th	Nacionalista	Re-elected in 1957.	1957–1961; Agoncillo, Balayan, Calaca, Calatagan, Lemery, Lian, Nasugbu, San Luis, San Nicolas, Taal, Tuy
9		Apolinario R. Apacible	December 30, 1949	August 22, 1963	5th	Nacionalista	Re-elected in 1961. Died.	1961–1972; Agoncillo, Balayan, Calaca, Calatagan, Lemery, Lian, Nasugbu, San Luis, San Nicolas, Santa Teresita, Taal, Tuy
10		Luis N. López	January 27, 1964	December 30, 1965	5th	Liberal	Elected in 1963 to finish Apacible's term.	1961–1972; Agoncillo, Balayan, Calaca, Calatagan, Lemery, Lian, Nasugbu, San Luis, San Nicolas, Santa Teresita, Taal, Tuy
11		Federico M. Serrano	December 30, 1965	December 30, 1969	6th	Nacionalista	Elected in 1965.	1961–1972; Agoncillo, Balayan, Calaca, Calatagan, Lemery, Lian, Nasugbu, San Luis, San Nicolas, Santa Teresita, Taal, Tuy
12		Roberto C. Diokno	December 30, 1969	September 23, 1972	7th	Nacionalista	Elected in 1969. Removed from office after imposition of martial law.	1961–1972; Agoncillo, Balayan, Calaca, Calatagan, Lemery, Lian, Nasugbu, San Luis, San Nicolas, Santa Teresita, Taal, Tuy
District dissolved into the twenty-seat Region IV-A's at-large district for the Interim Batasang Pambansa, followed by the four-seat Batangas's at-large district for the Regular Batasang Pambansa.
District re-created February 2, 1987.
13		Conrado V. Apacible	June 30, 1987	June 30, 1992	8th	Lakas ng Bansa	Elected in 1987.	1987–present Balayan, Calaca, Calatagan, Lemery, Lian, Nasugbu, Taal, Tuy
14		Eduardo Ermita	June 30, 1992	January 25, 2001	9th	Lakas	Elected in 1992.	1987–present Balayan, Calaca, Calatagan, Lemery, Lian, Nasugbu, Taal, Tuy
14		Eduardo Ermita	June 30, 1992	January 25, 2001	10th	Lakas	Re-elected in 1995.	1987–present Balayan, Calaca, Calatagan, Lemery, Lian, Nasugbu, Taal, Tuy
14		Eduardo Ermita	June 30, 1992	January 25, 2001	11th	Lakas	Re-elected in 1998. Resigned on appointment as acting Secretary of National Defense.	1987–present Balayan, Calaca, Calatagan, Lemery, Lian, Nasugbu, Taal, Tuy
15		Eileen Ermita-Buhain	June 30, 2001	June 30, 2010	12th	Lakas	Elected in 2001.	1987–present Balayan, Calaca, Calatagan, Lemery, Lian, Nasugbu, Taal, Tuy
15		Eileen Ermita-Buhain	June 30, 2001	June 30, 2010	13th	Lakas	Re-elected in 2004.	1987–present Balayan, Calaca, Calatagan, Lemery, Lian, Nasugbu, Taal, Tuy
15		Eileen Ermita-Buhain	June 30, 2001	June 30, 2010	14th	Lakas	Re-elected in 2007.	1987–present Balayan, Calaca, Calatagan, Lemery, Lian, Nasugbu, Taal, Tuy
16		Tomas Apacible	June 30, 2010	June 30, 2013	15th	Liberal	Elected in 2010.	1987–present Balayan, Calaca, Calatagan, Lemery, Lian, Nasugbu, Taal, Tuy
(15)		Eileen Ermita-Buhain	June 30, 2013	June 30, 2022	16th	Nacionalista	Elected in 2013.	1987–present Balayan, Calaca, Calatagan, Lemery, Lian, Nasugbu, Taal, Tuy
(15)		Eileen Ermita-Buhain	June 30, 2013	June 30, 2022	17th	Nacionalista	Re-elected in 2016.	1987–present Balayan, Calaca, Calatagan, Lemery, Lian, Nasugbu, Taal, Tuy
(15)		Eileen Ermita-Buhain	June 30, 2013	June 30, 2022	18th	Nacionalista	Re-elected in 2019.	1987–present Balayan, Calaca, Calatagan, Lemery, Lian, Nasugbu, Taal, Tuy
17		Eric Buhain	June 30, 2022	June 30, 2025	19th	Nacionalista	Elected in 2022.	1987–present Balayan, Calaca, Calatagan, Lemery, Lian, Nasugbu, Taal, Tuy
18		Leandro Leviste	June 30, 2025	Incumbent	20th	Independent	Elected in 2025.	1987–present Balayan, Calaca, Calatagan, Lemery, Lian, Nasugbu, Taal, Tuy
18		Leandro Leviste	June 30, 2025	Incumbent	20th	Lakas	Elected in 2025.	1987–present Balayan, Calaca, Calatagan, Lemery, Lian, Nasugbu, Taal, Tuy

== Election results ==
=== 2025 ===
Candidate	Party	Votes	%
Leandro Leviste	Independent	268,764	74.58
Eric Buhain (incumbent)	Nacionalista Party	91,588	25.42
Total		360,352	100.00
Registered voters/turnout		419,735	–
Independent gain from Nacionalista Party			
Source: Commission on Elections

=== 2022 ===
2022 Philippine House of Representatives elections
Party	Candidate	Votes	%
Nacionalista	Eric Buhain	143,573	45.29%
NPC	Lisa Ermita	127,421	40.19%
PPP	Gerry Manalo	42,192	13.31%
Ang Kapatiran	Luisito Ruiz	3,839	1.21%
Total votes		317,025	100.00%
Nacionalista hold			

=== 2019 ===
2019 Philippine House of Representatives elections
Party	Candidate	Votes	%
Nacionalista	Eileen Ermita-Buhain	209,091	81.27
PDP–Laban	Conrado Apacible	48,158	18.72
Total votes		257,249	100.00
Nacionalista hold			

=== 2016 ===
2016 Philippine House of Representatives elections
Party	Candidate	Votes	%
Nacionalista	Eileen Ermita-Buhain	191,351	69.49
Independent	Valentino Lopez	43,846	15.92
Invalid or blank votes		40,164	14.59
Total votes		275,361	100.00
Nacionalista hold			

=== 2013 ===
2013 Philippine House of Representatives elections
Party	Candidate	Votes	%
Nacionalista	Eileen Ermita-Buhain	103,571	45.61
Liberal	Tomas Apacible	98,252	43.27
Independent	Luisito Ruiz	2,640	1.16
Independent	Reynaldo Albajera	1,444	0.64
Margin of victory		5,319	2.34%
Invalid or blank votes		21,178	9.33
Total votes		227,085	100.00
Nacionalista gain from Liberal			

=== 2010 ===
2010 Philippine House of Representatives elections
Party	Candidate	Votes	%
Liberal	Tomas Apacible	124,196	54.83
Lakas–Kampi	Eduardo Ermita	102,890	45.17
Valid ballots		227,806	91.71
Invalid or blank votes		20,600	8.29
Total votes		248,406	100.00
Liberal gain from Lakas–Kampi			

=== 2007 ===
2007 Philippine House of Representatives elections
Party	Candidate	Votes	%
Lakas	Eileen Ermita-Buhain	101,127	58.26
UNO	Raymund Apacible	72,448	41.74
Total votes		173,575	100.00
Lakas hold			

=== 1963 ===
1963 Batangas's 1st congressional district special election
Candidate	Party	Votes	%
Luis N. Lopez	Liberal Party	16,023	31.20
Manuel Serrano	Independent	9,459	18.42
Quirino Apacible	Nacionalista Party	8,779	17.09
Arsenio Cabrera	No party indicated	5,721	11.14
Ceferino Inciong	Liberal Party	5,507	10.72
Pedro Belmi	Nacionalista Party	4,040	7.87
Ramon Limioco	Nacionalista Party	1,177	2.29
Orlando Macabuhay	No party indicated	658	1.28
Total		51,364	100.00
Liberal Party gain from Nacionalista Party			
Source: COMELEC (1965)

== See also ==
- Legislative districts of Batangas
