= Calaca, Batangas =

Component city in Batangas, Philippines

Calaca
- Component city
- City of Calaca
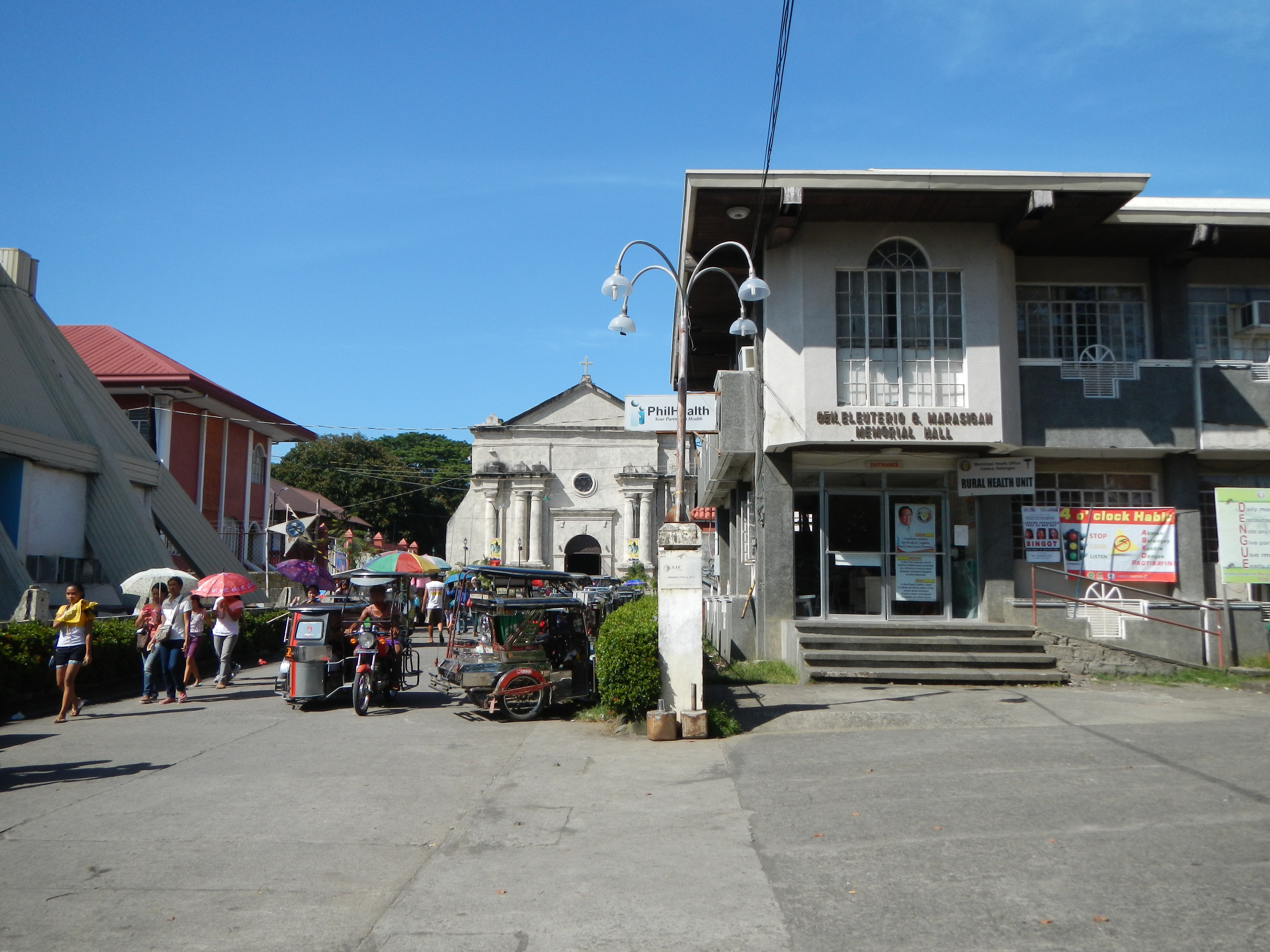
- Street outside Gen. Eleuterio Marasigan Memorial Hall

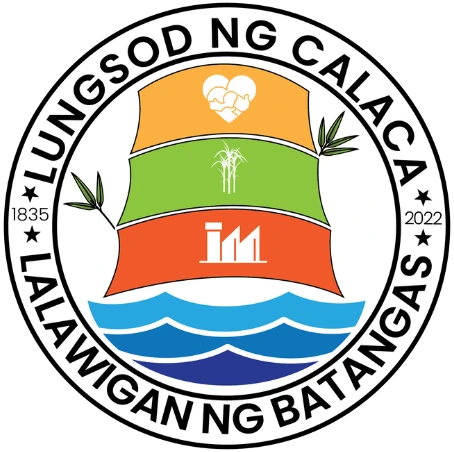
- Seal

- Map of Batangas with Calaca highlighted
- Interactive map of Calaca
- Location within the Philippines
- Coordinates: 13°55′48″N 120°48′47″E
- Country: Philippines
- Region: Calabarzon
- Province: Batangas
- District: 1st district
- Founded: May 10, 1835
- Cityhood: September 3, 2022
- Barangays: 40 (see Barangays)

Government
  - Type: Sangguniang Panlungsod
  - Mayor: Sofronio Leonardo C. Ona Jr.
  - Vice Mayor: Jerry Raphael I. Katigbak
  - Representative: Leandro Antonio L. Leviste
  - City Council: Members: Cedric M. De Joya; Deovic M. Ontangco; Prima C. Dajoyag; Divina A. Opelanio; Rexner Jown V. Pastoral; Rosalie M. Salazar; Robenson M. Sale; Caesar Ryan M. Noche; Lindzey B. Endozo-Atienza; Eric B. Atajar
  - Electorate: 63,857 voters (2025)

Area
  - Total: 114.58 km^{2} (44.24 sq mi)
- Elevation: 49 m (161 ft)
- Highest elevation: 253 m (830 ft)
- Lowest elevation: 0 m (0 ft)

Population (2024 census)
  - Total: 92,281
  - Density: 805.38/km^{2} (2,085.9/sq mi)
  - Households: 20,901

Economy
  - Poverty incidence: 9.17% (2023)
  - Revenue: ₱ 1,896 million (2024)
  - Assets: ₱ 4,236 million (2024)
  - Expenditure: ₱ 802.6 million (2024)
  - Liabilities: ₱ 1,150 million (2024)

Service provider
  - Electricity: Batangas 1 Electric Cooperative (BATELEC 1)
- Time zone: UTC+8 (PST)
- ZIP code: 4212
- PSGC: 0401007000
- IDD : area code: +63 (0)43
- Native languages: Tagalog
- Website: calaca.gov.ph

Calaca, officially the City of Calaca (Filipino: Lungsod ng Calaca), is a component city in the province of Batangas, Philippines. According to the 2024 census, it has a population of 92,281 people.

Calaca is home to the lively Calacatchara festival (a portmanteau of Calaca and atchara (chutney). It is politically subdivided into 40 barangays.

== Etymology ==
The name was taken from the roofs of the houses made of bamboos halves arranged over top of one another. One anecdote believes that: When it was still a sitio and long been called Calaca, three Spanish officials happened to pass by. They saw some carpenters making the roof of a house. They asked one of the carpenters about the name of the place. The carpenter, who did not know Spanish, believed that the Spaniards were asking what they were making and they answered, “calaca.” The Spaniards noted the name and since then, Calaca became the official name.

== History ==
Calaca was part of Balayan when it was used to be a barrio. On May 10, 1835, it was officially converted into a town. Don Rufino Punungbayan was the first Gobernadorcillo of the municipality during the year 1835–1836.

=== Cityhood ===
On March 11, 2020, House Bill No. 6598 was filed for the conversion of the municipality of Calaca into a component city in the province of Batangas. Both the House of Representatives and the Senate passed the bill. On May 26, 2021, President Rodrigo Duterte approved the bill through Republic Act No. 11544. On August 19, 2021, COMELEC postponed the plebiscite which seeks to ratify the conversion of Calaca into a city for the preparation of the 2022 elections. COMELEC then set the plebiscite on September 3, 2022. After the plebiscite passed, Calaca became the fifth city in Batangas and the first in the province's 1st legislative district.

Calaca cityhood plebiscite
Choice	Votes	%
For	29,424	88.61
Against	3,781	11.39
Total	33,205	100.00
Valid votes	33,205	100.00
Invalid/blank votes	0	0.00
Total votes	33,205	100.00
Registered voters/turnout	58,881	56.39
Source: Press statement from the COMELEC via Twitter; news article from Manila Bulletin

== Geography ==
According to the Philippine Statistics Authority, the city has a land area of 114.58 square kilometres (44.24 sq mi) constituting 3.67% of the 3,119.75-square-kilometre (1,204.54 sq mi) total area of Batangas.

Calaca is 38 kilometres (24 mi) from Batangas City and 116 kilometres (72 mi) from Manila.

=== Barangays ===
Calaca is politically subdivided into 40 barangays, as indicated in the matrix below.. Each barangay consists of puroks and some have sitios.

As of June 30, 2021, there are five barangays that are considered urban (highlighted in bold).

PSGC	Barangay	Population			±% p.a.	
		2024		2010		
041007001	Bagong Tubig	2.6%	2,434	2,083	▴	1.08%
041007002	Baclas	1.8%	1,688	1,574	▴	0.48%
041007003	Balimbing	0.5%	494	456	▴	0.55%
041007004	Bambang	1.5%	1,415	1,239	▴	0.92%
041007006	Barangay 1 (Poblacion)	2.1%	1,903	1,839	▴	0.24%
041007007	Barangay 2 (Poblacion)	0.9%	827	729	▴	0.88%
041007008	Barangay 3 (Poblacion)	0.3%	278	279	▾	−0.02%
041007009	**Barangay 4 (Poblacion)**	1.1%	1,031	908	▴	0.88%
041007010	Barangay 5 (Poblacion)	1.2%	1,096	1,004	▴	0.61%
041007011	Barangay 6 (Poblacion)	0.8%	762	742	▴	0.18%
041007012	Bisaya	1.1%	1,016	861	▴	1.15%
041007013	Cahil	4.1%	3,742	2,929	▴	1.71%
041007014	Caluangan	2.0%	1,863	1,699	▴	0.64%
041007015	Calantas	3.4%	3,128	2,784	▴	0.81%
041007016	**Camastilisan**	4.5%	4,147	3,425	▴	1.33%
041007017	Coral ni Lopez (Sugod)	2.1%	1,921	1,695	▴	0.87%
041007018	Coral ni Bacal	1.5%	1,389	1,145	▴	1.34%
041007019	**Dacanlao**	6.7%	6,177	5,243	▴	1.14%
041007020	Dila	1.8%	1,624	1,504	▴	0.53%
041007021	Loma	1.5%	1,346	1,112	▴	1.33%
041007022	Lumbang Calzada	3.1%	2,820	2,329	▴	1.33%
041007023	Lumbang na Bata	2.0%	1,873	1,769	▴	0.40%
041007024	Lumbang na Matanda	2.8%	2,549	1,944	▴	1.89%
041007025	Madalunot	2.1%	1,927	1,675	▴	0.97%
041007027	Makina	1.4%	1,301	1,094	▴	1.20%
041007028	Matipok	2.0%	1,830	1,515	▴	1.31%
041007030	Munting Coral	0.4%	387	328	▴	1.15%
041007031	Niyugan	1.5%	1,404	1,185	▴	1.18%
041007032	**Pantay**	6.1%	5,654	4,517	▴	1.56%
041007033	Puting Bato West	3.6%	3,291	2,892	▴	0.90%
041007034	Puting Kahoy	1.4%	1,310	1,179	▴	0.73%
041007035	Puting Bato East	2.3%	2,145	2,001	▴	0.48%
041007036	Quisumbing	2.4%	2,193	1,824	▴	1.28%
041007037	Salong	5.2%	4,766	4,130	▴	0.99%
041007038	**San Rafael**	1.0%	965	661	▴	2.65%
041007039	Sinisian	2.2%	2,025	1,764	▴	0.96%
041007041	Taklang Anak	1.3%	1,190	980	▴	1.35%
041007042	Talisay	2.2%	1,985	1,935	▴	0.18%
041007043	Tamayo	1.7%	1,590	1,435	▴	0.71%
041007044	Timbain	2.6%	2,373	2,114	▴	0.80%
	**Total**		92,281	70,521	▴	1.88%

=== Climate ===
Climate data for Calaca City, Batangas
Month	Jan	Feb	Mar	Apr	May	Jun	Jul	Aug	Sep	Oct	Nov	Dec	Year
Mean daily maximum °C (°F)	29 (84)	30 (86)	31 (88)	33 (91)	32 (90)	30 (86)	29 (84)	29 (84)	29 (84)	29 (84)	29 (84)	29 (84)	30 (86)
Mean daily minimum °C (°F)	20 (68)	20 (68)	21 (70)	22 (72)	24 (75)	24 (75)	24 (75)	24 (75)	24 (75)	23 (73)	22 (72)	21 (70)	22 (72)
Average precipitation mm (inches)	11 (0.4)	13 (0.5)	14 (0.6)	32 (1.3)	101 (4.0)	142 (5.6)	208 (8.2)	187 (7.4)	175 (6.9)	131 (5.2)	68 (2.7)	39 (1.5)	1,121 (44.3)
Average rainy days	5.2	5.0	7.4	11.5	19.8	23.5	27.0	25.9	25.2	23.2	15.5	8.3	197.5
Source: Meteoblue (Use with caution: this is modeled/calculated data, not measured locally.)

== Demographics ==
Population census of Calaca
Year	Pop.	±% p.a.
1903	5,838	—
1918	9,310	+3.16%
1939	10,671	+0.65%
1948	13,551	+2.69%
1960	18,667	+2.70%
1970	27,780	+4.05%
1975	31,705	+2.69%
1980	36,508	+2.86%
1990	45,377	+2.20%
1995	51,459	+2.38%
2000	58,489	+2.78%
2007	64,966	+1.46%
2010	70,521	+3.03%
2015	81,859	+2.88%
2020	87,361	+1.38%
2024	92,281	+1.32%
Source: Philippine Statistics Authority

In the 2024 census, Calaca had a population of 92,281 people. The population density was 810 inhabitants per square kilometre (2,100/sq mi).

== Economy ==
Calaca is currently identified by the Philippine Statistics Agency as a 1st class municipal economic zone. The Philippine Statistics Agency as of September 2022 had not made a determination of the income classification on the city scale for Calaca based on the previous four years of revenue.

Poverty incidence of Calaca (%)

Source: Philippine Statistics Authority

== Education ==
The Calaca City Schools Division Office governs all educational institutions within the municipality. It oversees the management and operations of all private and public, from primary to secondary schools.

=== Primary and elementary schools ===
- Baclas Elementary School
- Bagong Tubig Elementary School
- Bambang Elementary School
- Bisaya School
- Cahil Elementary School
- Calaca Academy
- Calaca Central School
- Calaca Christian Institute of Batangas
- Calantas Elementary School
- Caluangan Elementary School
- Camastilisan Elementary School
- Coral Ni Bacal Elementary School
- Dacanlao G. Agoncillo Elementary School
- Dila Elementary School
- Loma Elementary School
- Lumbang Calzada Elementary School
- Lumbang na Bata Elementary School
- Lumbang na Matanda Elementary School
- Madalunot Elementary School
- Maria J. Lopez Elementary School
- Matala Elementary School
- Matipok Elementary School
- Niyugan Elementary School
- Pedro A. Paterno Memorial Elementary School
- Puting Bato Elementary School
- Puting Kahoy Primary School
- R. Concepcion Montessori School
- Salong Elementary School
- Sinisian Elementary School
- St. Raphael Archangel Parochial School
- Sugod Elementary School
- Taklang Anak Elementary School
- Talisay Elementary School
- Tamayo Elementary School
- Timbain School

=== Secondary schools ===
- Batangas Province Science High School
- Cahil National High School
- Calaca Senior High School
- Dacanlao G. Agoncillo National High School
- Lumbang na Matanda National High School
- Pedro Paterno National High School
- Puting Kahoy National High School

== Gallery ==
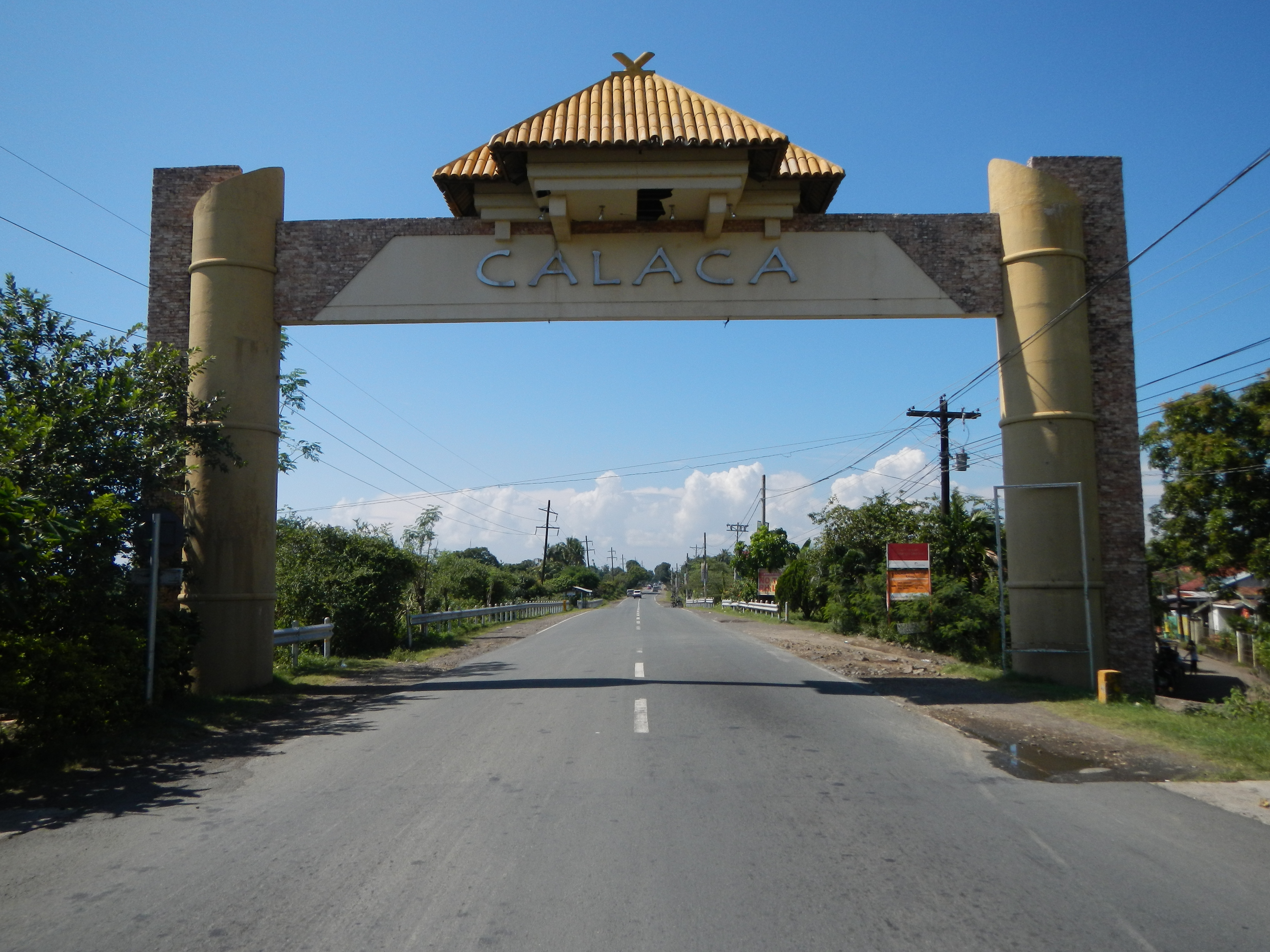
Welcome arch from Lemery

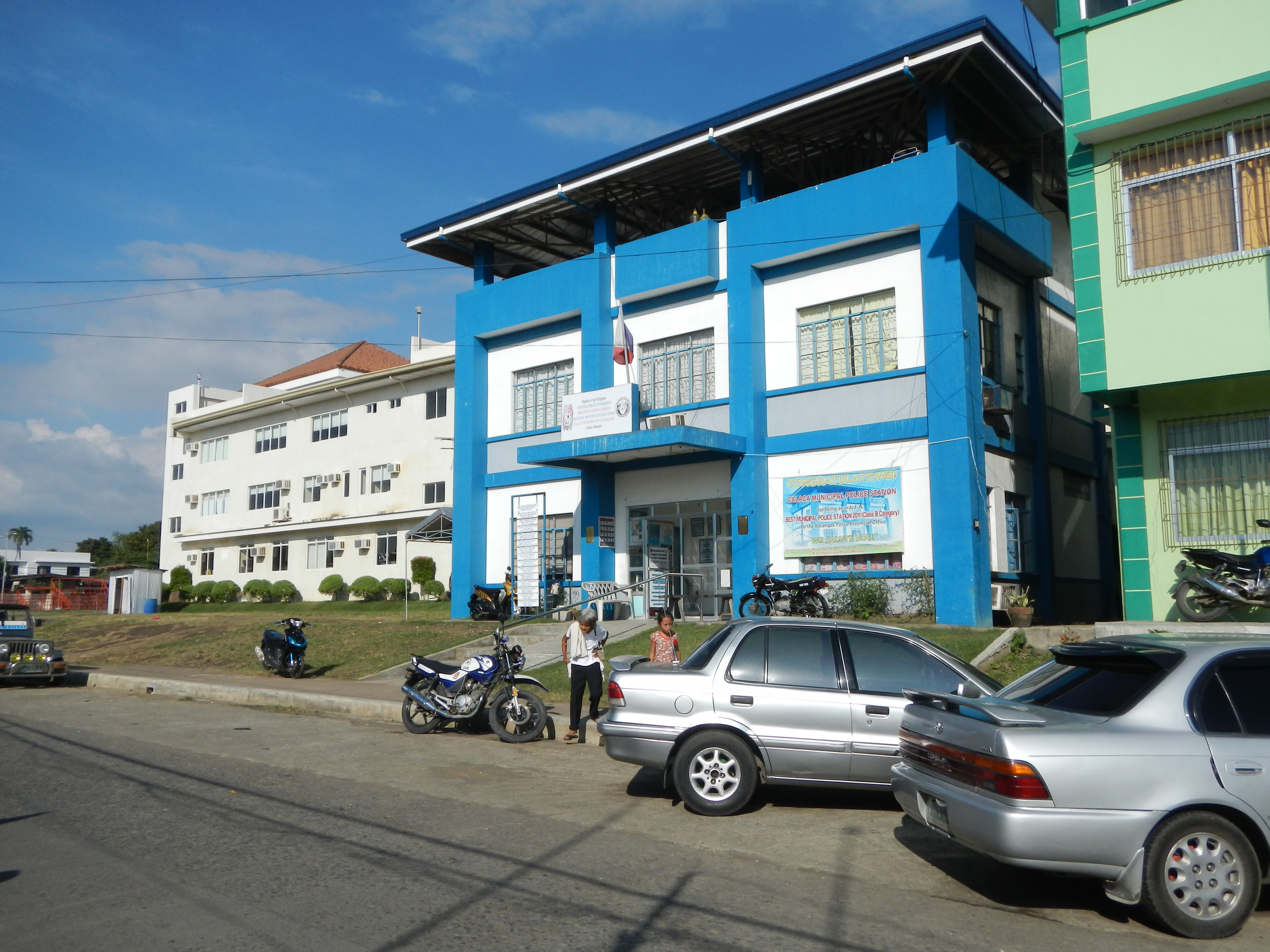
Police station

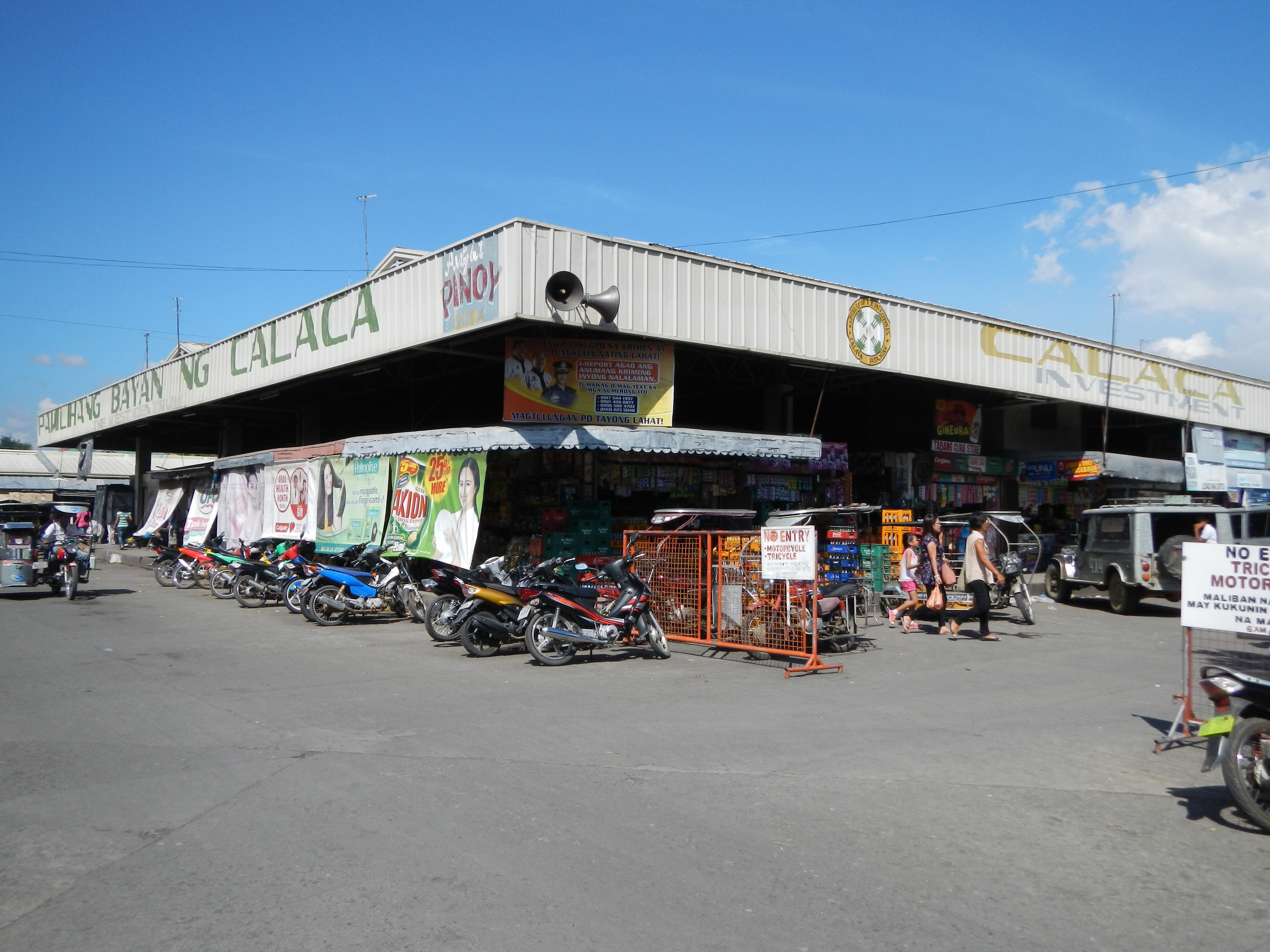
Public market

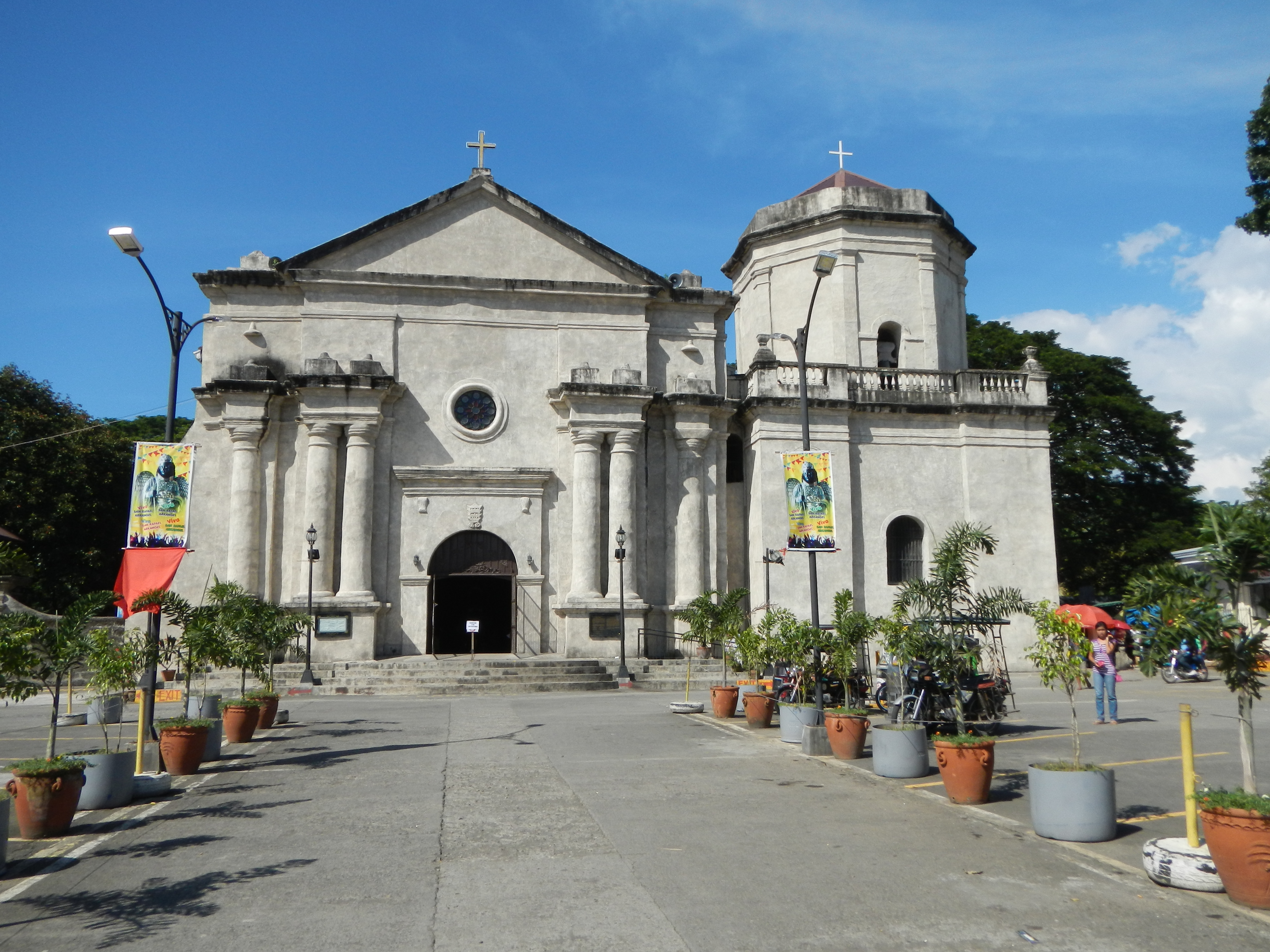
Saint Raphael the Archangel Parish Church
