= Lian, Batangas =

Municipality in Batangas, Philippines

Lian Lian
- Municipality
- Municipality of Lian
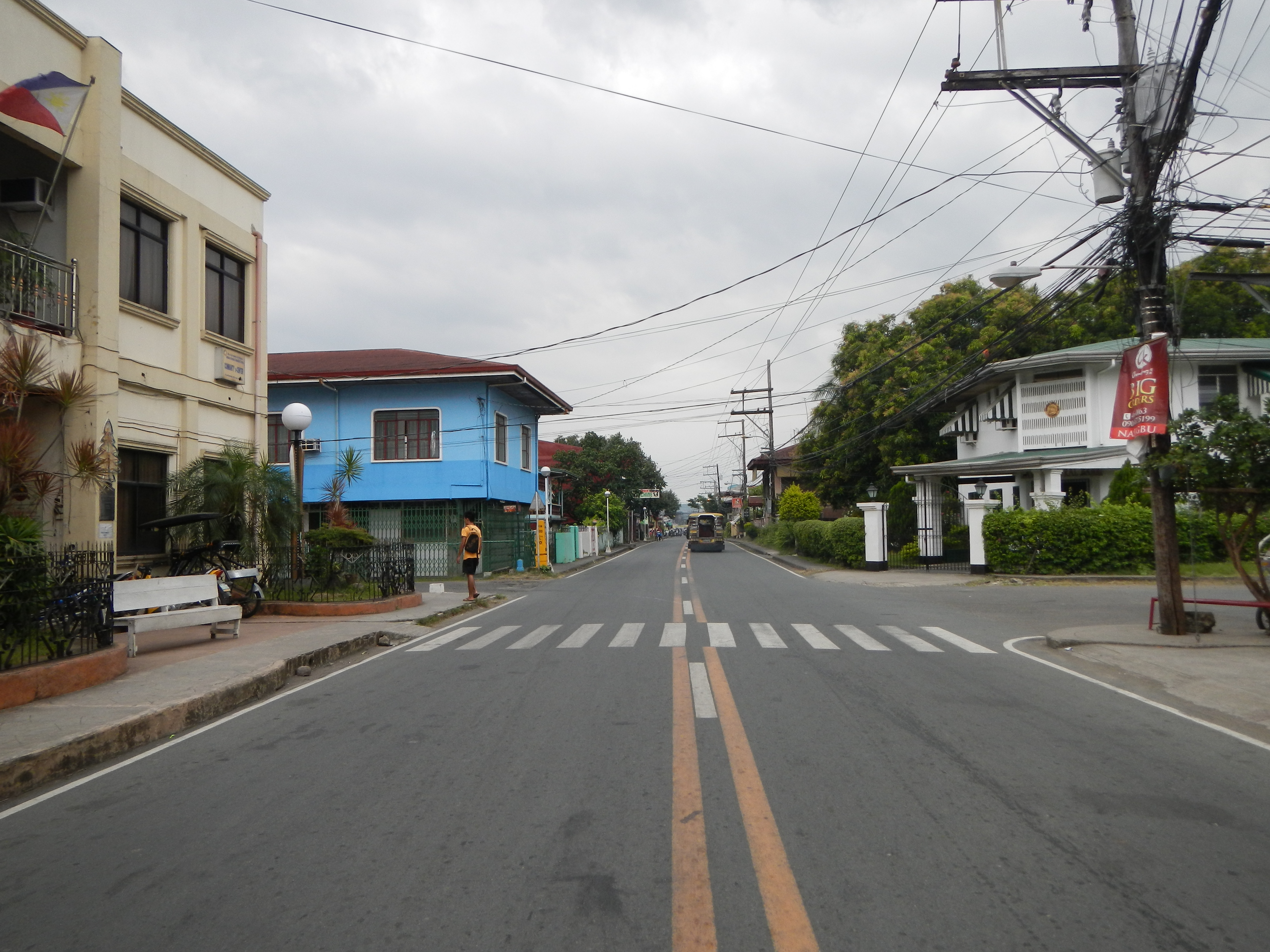
- Street in Lian

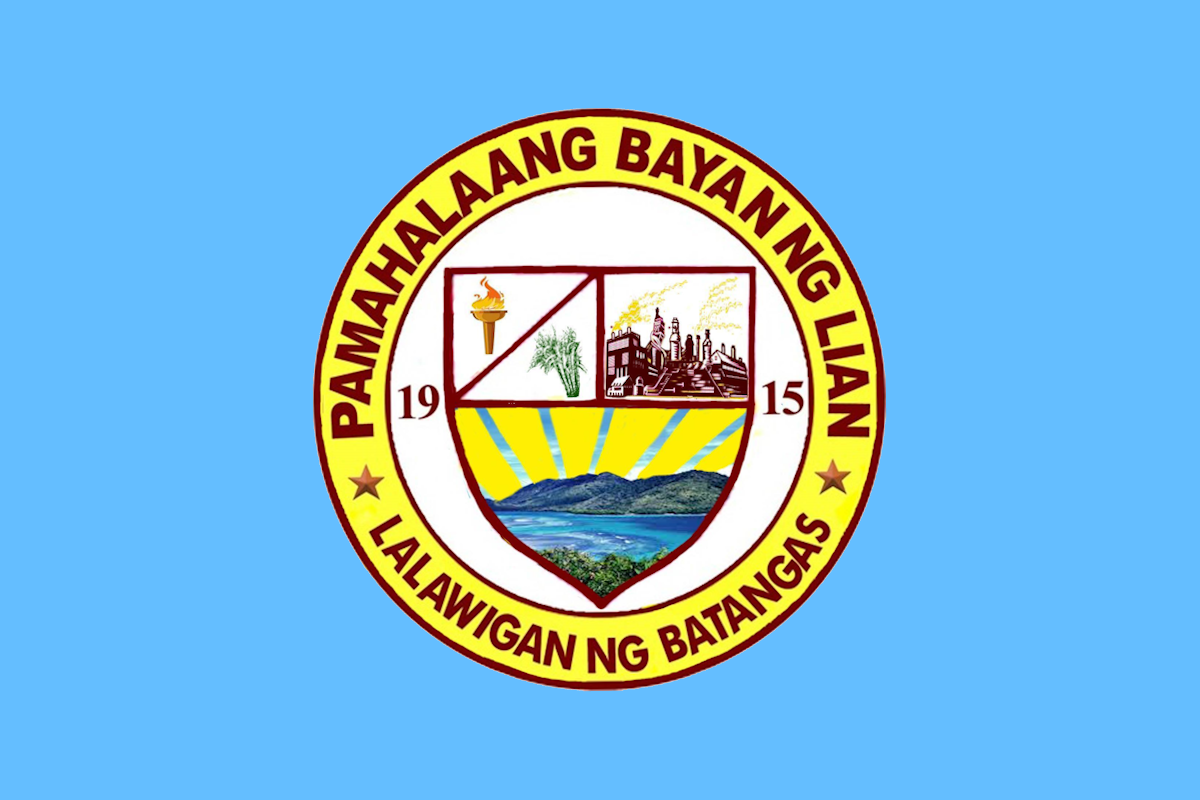
- Flag Seal

- Map of Batangas with Lian highlighted
- Interactive map of Lian
- Location within the Philippines
- Coordinates: 14°02′N 120°39′E
- Country: Philippines
- Region: Calabarzon
- Province: Batangas
- District: 1st district
- Founded: 1760
- Annexation to Nasugbu: March 28, 1903
- Reestablished: January 1, 1915
- Barangays: 19 (see Barangays)

Government
  - Type: Sangguniang Bayan
  - Mayor: Joseph V. Peji
  - Vice Mayor: Iniño V. Bolompo
  - Representative: Leandro Antonio L. Leviste
  - Municipal Council: Members: Osita P. Vergara; Roland H. Magyaya; Bren Matthew C. Magbago; Cesar R. Lagus Jr.; Florante C. Lagus Jr.; Lauro A. Butiong; Reynaldo J. Herrera Jr.; Exequel L. Bonuan
  - Electorate: 37,493 voters (2025)

Area
  - Total: 76.80 km^{2} (29.65 sq mi)
- Elevation: 36 m (118 ft)
- Highest elevation: 275 m (902 ft)
- Lowest elevation: 0 m (0 ft)

Population (2024 census)
  - Total: 56,788
  - Density: 739.4/km^{2} (1,915/sq mi)
  - Households: 15,991
- Demonym: Lianeño

Economy
  - Income class: 1st municipal income class
  - Poverty incidence: 8.39% (2023)
  - Revenue: ₱ 275.4 million (2024)
  - Assets: ₱ 521.3 million (2024)
  - Expenditure: ₱ 170.5 million (2024)
  - Liabilities: ₱ 81.88 million (2024)

Service provider
  - Electricity: Batangas 1 Electric Cooperative (BATELEC 1)
  - Water: Lian Water District
- Time zone: UTC+8 (PST)
- ZIP code: 4216
- PSGC: 0401013000
- IDD : area code: +63 (0)43
- Native languages: Tagalog
- Website: www.lian.gov.ph

Lian, officially the Municipality of Lian (Tagalog: Bayan ng Lian), is a municipality in the province of Batangas, Philippines. According to the 2024 census, it has a population of 56,788 people.

The patron saint of Lian is St. John the Baptist.

== Etymology ==
According to the early residents of the town, it was initially named Lia, after the leader of the first group of Chinese traders who settled there. However, there is no significance if it is associated with the old name of the town. When Spaniards asked the traders about the name of the place and "Lia" was the answer, they took it as "Lian," the town's present name.

== History ==
Lian was founded in 1760 by Chinese traders who settled in the area. There was no other information regarding the other settlers. Nevertheless the later 1818 Spanish census recorded there to be 629 native and Chinese families living in harmony with 7 Spanish-Filipino families.

On March 28, 1903, Lian was merged with the municipality of Nasugbu. On December 28, 1914, Governor-General Francis Burton Harrison signed Executive Order No. 127, separating Lian from Nasugbu to restore its independent municipality status effective January 1, 1915 by first mayor Kapitan Isko.

== Geography ==
Lian is located at 14°02′N 120°39′E. It is located at the western shore of Batangas, facing the Nasugbu Bay. It is 72 kilometers (45 mi) from Batangas City and 100 kilometers (62 mi) from Manila.

According to the Philippine Statistics Authority, the municipality has a land area of 76.80 square kilometers (29.65 sq mi) constituting 2.46% of the 3,119.75-square-kilometer (1,204.54 sq mi) total area of Batangas.

=== Barangays ===
Lian is politically subdivided into 19 barangays, as shown in the matrix below. Each barangay consists of puroks and some have sitios.

Barangays Tres, Uno, Dos, Quatro, Singko, Malaruhatan and Binubusan (which is not Poblacion) are considered urban barangays, while barangays San Diego, Bungahan, Prenza, Bagong Pook, Kapito, Lumaniag, Humayingan, Puting Kahoy, Cumba, Luyahan, Matabungkay, and Balibago are considered rural barangays.

PSGC	Barangay	Population			±% p.a.	
		2024		2010		
041013002	Bagong Pook	4.1%	2,321	2,011	▴	1.00%
041013003	Balibago	5.7%	3,250	2,964	▴	0.64%
041013004	Binubusan	8.1%	4,610	4,061	▴	0.88%
041013005	Bungahan	7.5%	4,249	3,415	▴	1.52%
041013007	Cumba	3.0%	1,724	1,487	▴	1.03%
041013008	Humayingan	2.7%	1,557	1,328	▴	1.11%
041013009	Kapito	5.8%	3,273	2,764	▴	1.18%
041013012	Lumaniag	4.1%	2,309	2,114	▴	0.61%
041013013	Luyahan	4.2%	2,392	2,251	▴	0.42%
041013014	Malaruhatan	7.8%	4,410	3,322	▴	1.98%
041013015	Matabungkay	8.7%	4,938	4,389	▴	0.82%
041013016	Barangay 1 (Poblacion)	3.3%	1,895	1,598	▴	1.19%
041013017	Barangay 2 (Poblacion)	1.6%	928	514	▴	4.17%
041013018	Barangay 3 (Poblacion)	2.5%	1,411	1,413	▾	−0.01%
041013019	Barangay 4 (Poblacion)	2.6%	1,463	1,330	▴	0.66%
041013020	Barangay 5 (Poblacion)	1.9%	1,056	1,221	▾	−1.00%
041013021	Prenza	7.9%	4,486	4,070	▴	0.68%
041013022	Puting‑Kahoy	3.4%	1,905	1,707	▴	0.76%
041013023	San Diego	7.9%	4,483	3,984	▴	0.82%
	Total		56,788	45,943	▴	1.48%

=== Sitios ===
- Altura (Prenza)
- Bagbag (Bungahan)
- Balanoy (Prenza)
- Calumpit (Kapito)
- Ligtasin (Luyahan)
- Magahis (Humayingan)
- Molino (Kapito)
- Matuod (Luyahan)
- Pajo (Lumaniag)
- Tan-ag (San Diego)

=== Climate ===
Climate data for Lian, Batangas
Month	Jan	Feb	Mar	Apr	May	Jun	Jul	Aug	Sep	Oct	Nov	Dec	Year
Mean daily maximum °C (°F)	29 (84)	30 (86)	31 (88)	33 (91)	32 (90)	30 (86)	29 (84)	29 (84)	29 (84)	29 (84)	29 (84)	29 (84)	30 (86)
Mean daily minimum °C (°F)	20 (68)	20 (68)	21 (70)	22 (72)	24 (75)	24 (75)	24 (75)	24 (75)	24 (75)	23 (73)	22 (72)	21 (70)	22 (72)
Average precipitation mm (inches)	11 (0.4)	13 (0.5)	14 (0.6)	32 (1.3)	101 (4.0)	142 (5.6)	208 (8.2)	187 (7.4)	175 (6.9)	131 (5.2)	68 (2.7)	39 (1.5)	1,121 (44.3)
Average rainy days	5.2	5.0	7.4	11.5	19.8	23.5	27.0	25.9	25.2	23.2	15.5	8.3	197.5
Source: Meteoblue

The climate of Lian falls under the first type of classification, Type I, characterized by two pronounced seasons: Dry season from November to April and wet season for the rest of the year.

== Demographics ==
Population census of Lian
Year	Pop.	±% p.a.
1903	2,552	—
1918	5,104	+4.73%
1939	8,181	+2.27%
1948	10,702	+3.03%
1960	13,658	+2.05%
1970	20,624	+4.20%
1975	23,271	+2.45%
1980	26,091	+2.31%
1990	31,296	+1.84%
1995	36,000	+2.66%
2000	39,129	+1.80%
2007	44,925	+1.92%
2010	45,943	+0.82%
2015	52,660	+2.63%
2020	56,280	+1.41%
2024	56,788	+0.22%
Source: Philippine Statistics Authority

In the 2020 census, Lian had a population of 56,788 people. The population density was 740 inhabitants per square kilometer (1,900/sq mi).

Most of the people in Lian are Tagalogs. However, some Visayans are found in some barrios and barangays. The main language is Tagalog.

== Economy ==
Poverty incidence of Lian (%)

Source: Philippine Statistics Authority

Lian's main products include rice, corn, onion, calamansi, milkfish, which are sold at Lian Public Market and other various locations.

== Government ==
=== Local government ===
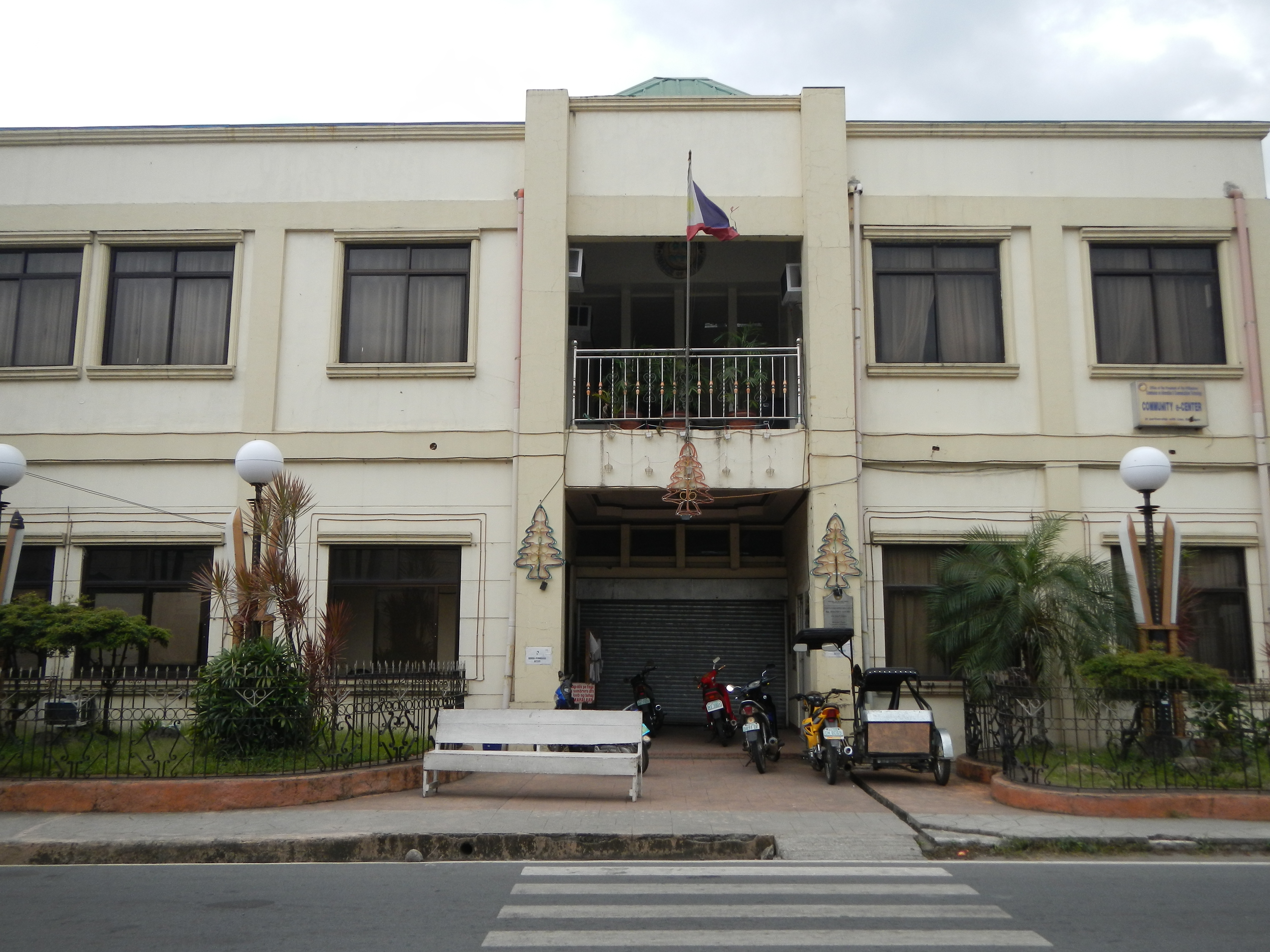
Municipal hall

Current officials as of 2022:

- Mayor: Joseph V. Peji
- Vice Mayor: Iniño V. Bolompo
- Councilors:^{3}
- Cesar R. Lagus, Jr.
- Benito A. Magbago
- Osita P. Vergara
- Arlene C. Lagus
- Leopoldo A. Jonson
- Roland H. Magyaya
- Lauro "Ompong" A. Butiong
- Reynaldo J. Herrera, Jr.

== Education ==
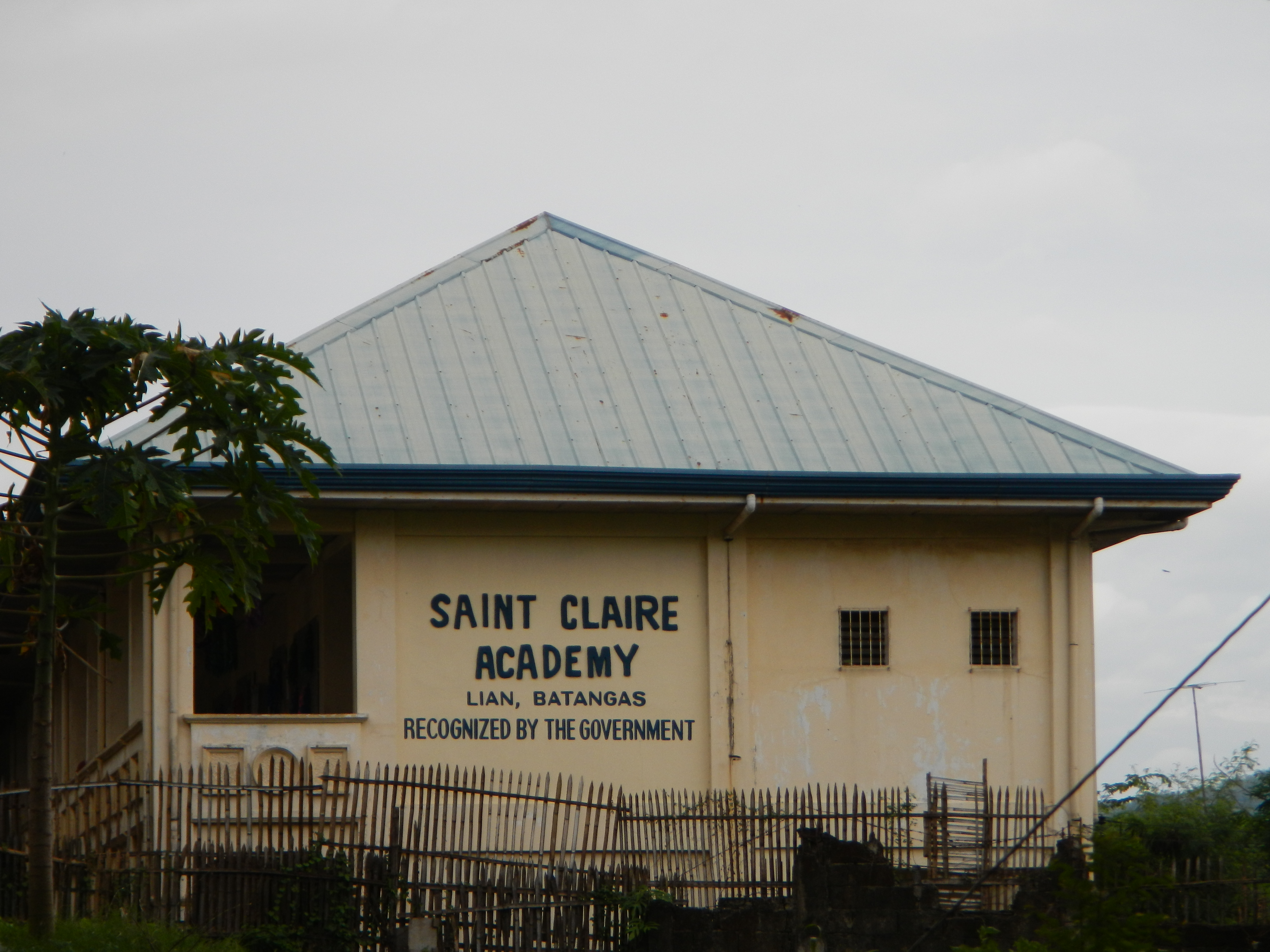
Saint Claire Academy

The Lian Schools District Office governs all educational institutions within the municipality. It oversees the management and operations of all private and public, from primary to secondary schools.

=== Primary and elementary schools ===
- Bagong Pook Elementary School
- Balibago Elementary School
- Binubusan Elementary School
- Bungahan Elementary School
- Cumba Elementary School
- Grand Prairie Learning School
- Humayingan Elementary School
- Kapito Elementary School
- Lian Central School
- Lian Montessori
- Lumaniag Elementary School
- Luyahan Elementary School
- Malaruhatan Elementary School
- Matabungkay Elementary School
- Prenza Elementary School
- Putingkahoy Elementary School
- R. B. Concepcion Montesorri School
- Smartkids of Mary Mediatrix School
- San Diego Elementary School
- Tan-ag Elementary School

=== Primary and secondary schools ===
- Saint Anne Academy
- Saint Claire Academy

=== Secondary schools ===
- Lian Institute
- Lian National High School (Malaruhatan)
- Lian Senior High School (Kapito)
- Matabungkay National High School

== Transport ==
Lian is plied by public transportation such as jeepneys, tricycles, and buses.

=== Access ===
The Calatagan-Nasugbu Highway and the Palico-Nasugbu Highway runs through the municipality.

== Tourism ==
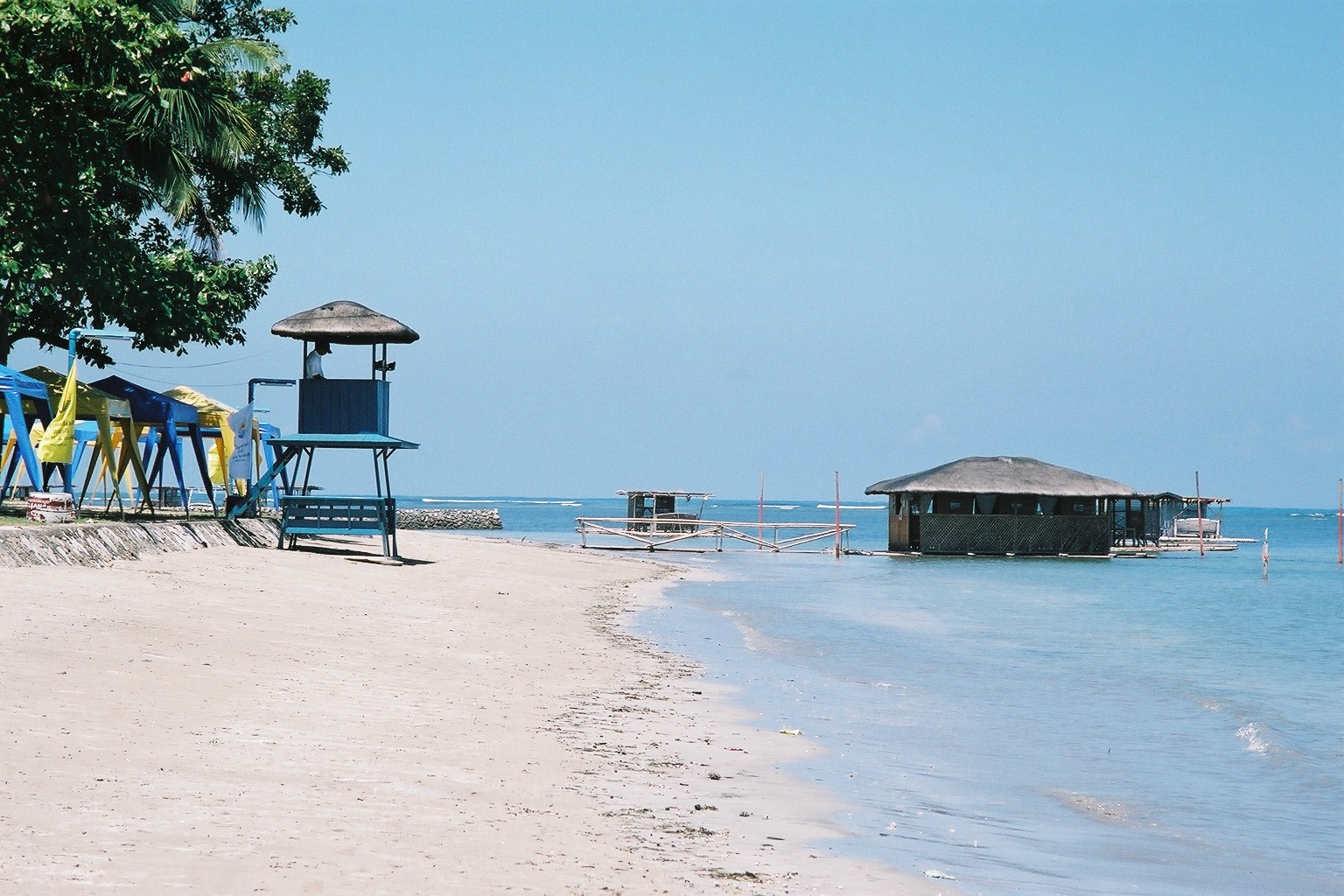
Matabungkay Beach

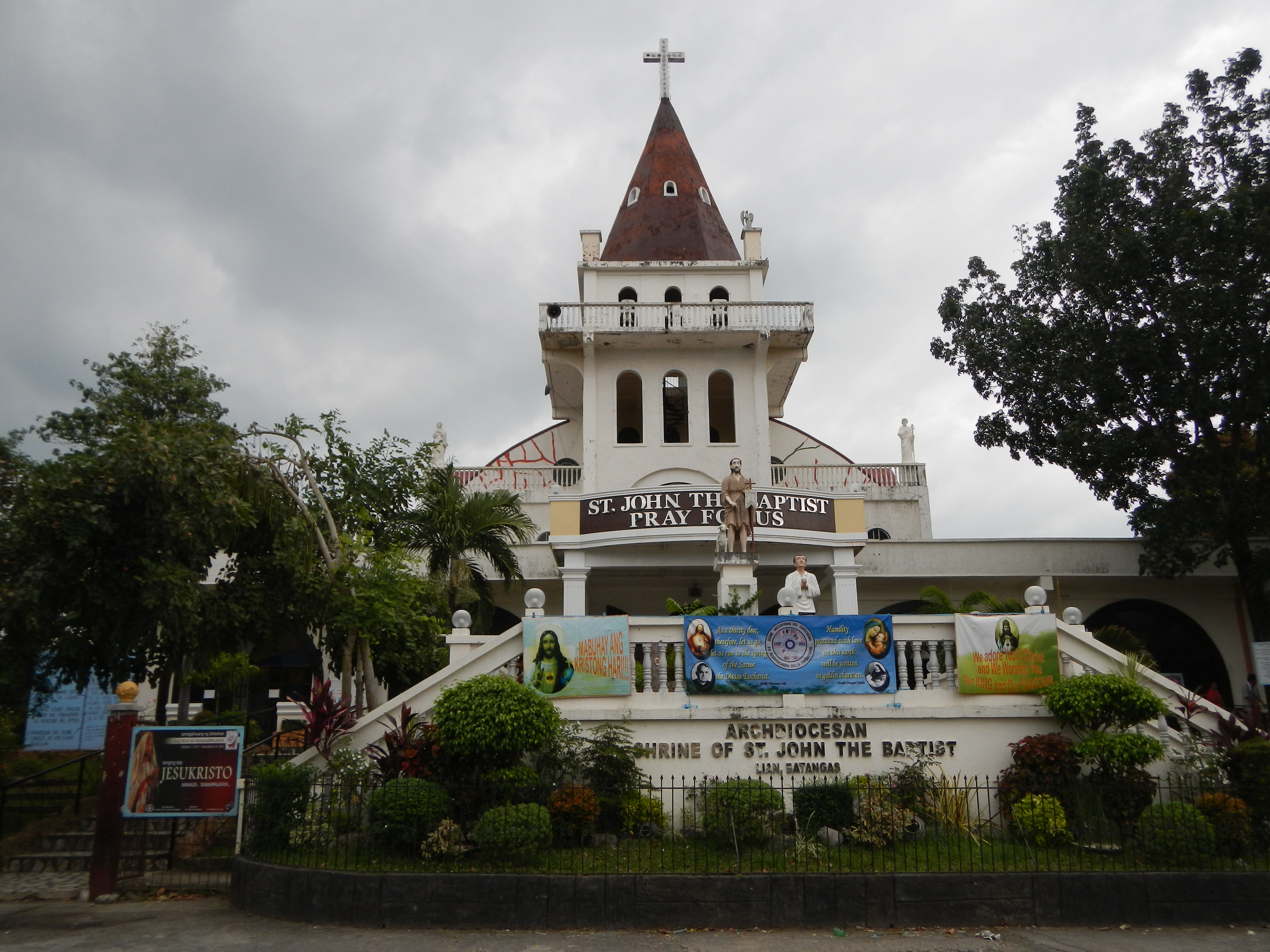
Archdiocesan Shrine of Saint John the Baptist

- Matabungkay Beach – a white sand beach accessible to Manila 120 kilometers (75 mi) away that was originally 'discovered' to be a great weekend or daytrip destination in the early 1950s, allegedly by sun starved German residents of Manila. It was soon a popular target for holiday-lovers, and permanent cottages (even deluxe beach houses) were built along the beach in the early 1960s by rich Manila folk.
- Town fiesta – Lian's fiesta is held annually every June 24 to commemorate the birthdate of Saint John the Baptist. It is being celebrated by five barangays in the Poblacion, Sitio Bag-bag, also celebrates its fiesta on this day because of its proximity to the town center than to its respective barangays, Kapito and Bungahan (Sitio Bag-bag is shared by 2 barangays).
- Balsa festival – The quaint barangay of Matabungkay is known for its wide beach, clear waters, creamy sand and the Balsa (bamboo beach raft). Every year, this small town comes alive in colorful celebrations as Matabungkay Beach Resort & Hotel hosts the Balsa Festival. The first ever Balsa Festival was held on May 18, 2002, aimed to help the local community by bringing back the town's popularity in the tourism map. With the continued support of the Department of Tourism, the Balsa Festival has become an annual event. Activities include the Balsa Race Competition, Balsa Decor and Cultural Dance Competition, a concert and dance party by the beach, prominent media personalities and foreign executives.

== Notable people ==
- Mark Leviste, Filipino politician
