= San Juan Nepomuceno Parish Church =

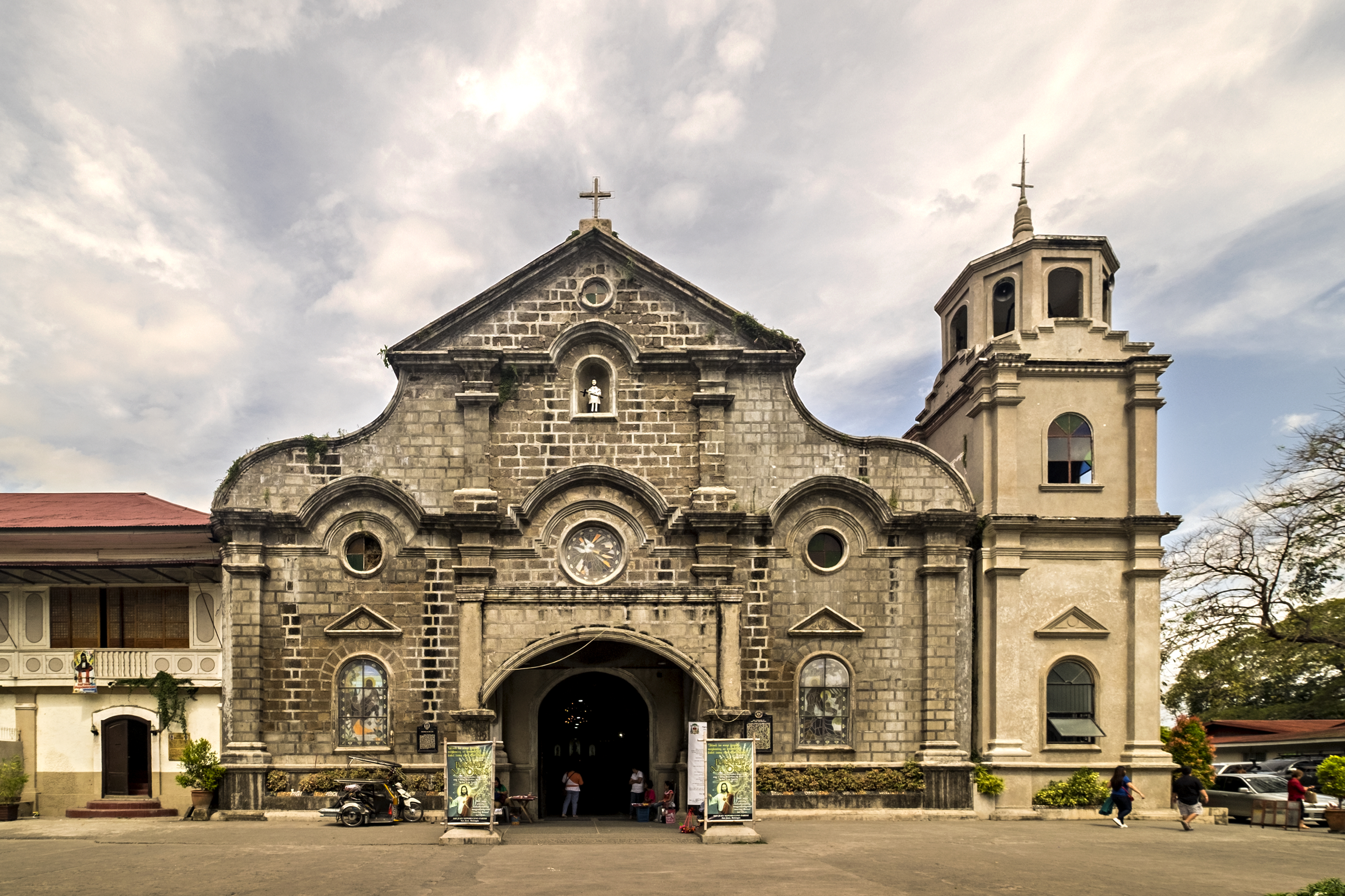
- The facade of the church in 2019
- San Juan Nepomuceno Parish Church
- 13.82849233206156°N 121.39494388570371°E
- Location: Padre Burgos Street, Poblacion; San Juan, Batangas
- Country: Philippines
- Denomination: Roman Catholic
- Religious institute: Oblates of St. Joseph

History
- Status: Parish church
- Founded: 1843
- Founder: Augustinian Recollects
- Dedication: John of Nepomuk

Architecture
- Functional status: Active
- Heritage designation: Historical Landmark
- Designated: 1990
- Architectural type: Church building
- Style: Baroque
- Groundbreaking: 1890
- Completed: 1894

Administration
- Province: Batangas
- Archdiocese: Lipa
- Deanery: IX: Vicariate of Our Lady of the Holy Rosary

Clergy
- Archbishop: Most Rev. Gilbert Garcera, DD
- Rector: Rev. Fr. Lee P. Leonida, OSJ

San Juan Nepomuceno Parish Church is a Roman Catholic parish church in the municipality of San Juan, Batangas, Philippines. It is under the jurisdiction of the Archdiocese of Lipa. Located at Padre Burgos Street in Poblacion, adjacent to three schools: Batangas Eastern Colleges, Joseph Marello Institute, and San Juan West Central School, this is the second church of San Juan after the old church ruins, located in Pinagbayanan, which was destroyed by floods in 1883.

== History ==
The first church, made from light materials including bamboo, was built in 1843 at present-day Pinagbayanan. It was later built in stone on August 10, 1855, under the initiative of Fr. Damaso Mojica. However, in 1883, the church was destroyed by the great flood, which prompted its town founder, Camilo Perez, to move the settlement to its present-day location.

In 1894, the second and present-day church was formally inaugurated and Fr. Celestino Yoldi became its parish priest. Between 1928 and 1935, a bell tower was built on the right corner of the church.

In 1978, the Oblates of St. Joseph took control of the church after the Recollects gave up the administration due to a lack of finances. In 1990, the church was designated as a historical landmark by the National Historical Commission of the Philippines.
