= San Juan Nepomuceno =

San Juan Nepomuceno is Spanish for "Saint John of Nepomuk". It can refer to:

- San Juan Nepomuceno (1765), a 74-gun Spanish ship of the line that took part in the Battle of Trafalgar, under the command of Brigadier Don Cosme Damian Churruca
- San Juan Nepomuceno, Bolívar, a municipality in Bolívar department of Colombia
- San Juan Nepomuceno, Mexico, a mining area in San Joaquín Municipality, Querétaro
- San Juan Nepomuceno, Paraguay
- San Juan Nepomuceno Parish Church, a historic Baroque church in San Juan, Batangas
