= Statue of John of Nepomuk, Vyšehrad =

Statue in Prague, Czech Republic

Coordinates: 50°03′53″N 14°25′11″E

Statue of John of Nepomuk
- Socha svatého Jana Nepomuckého (Czech)
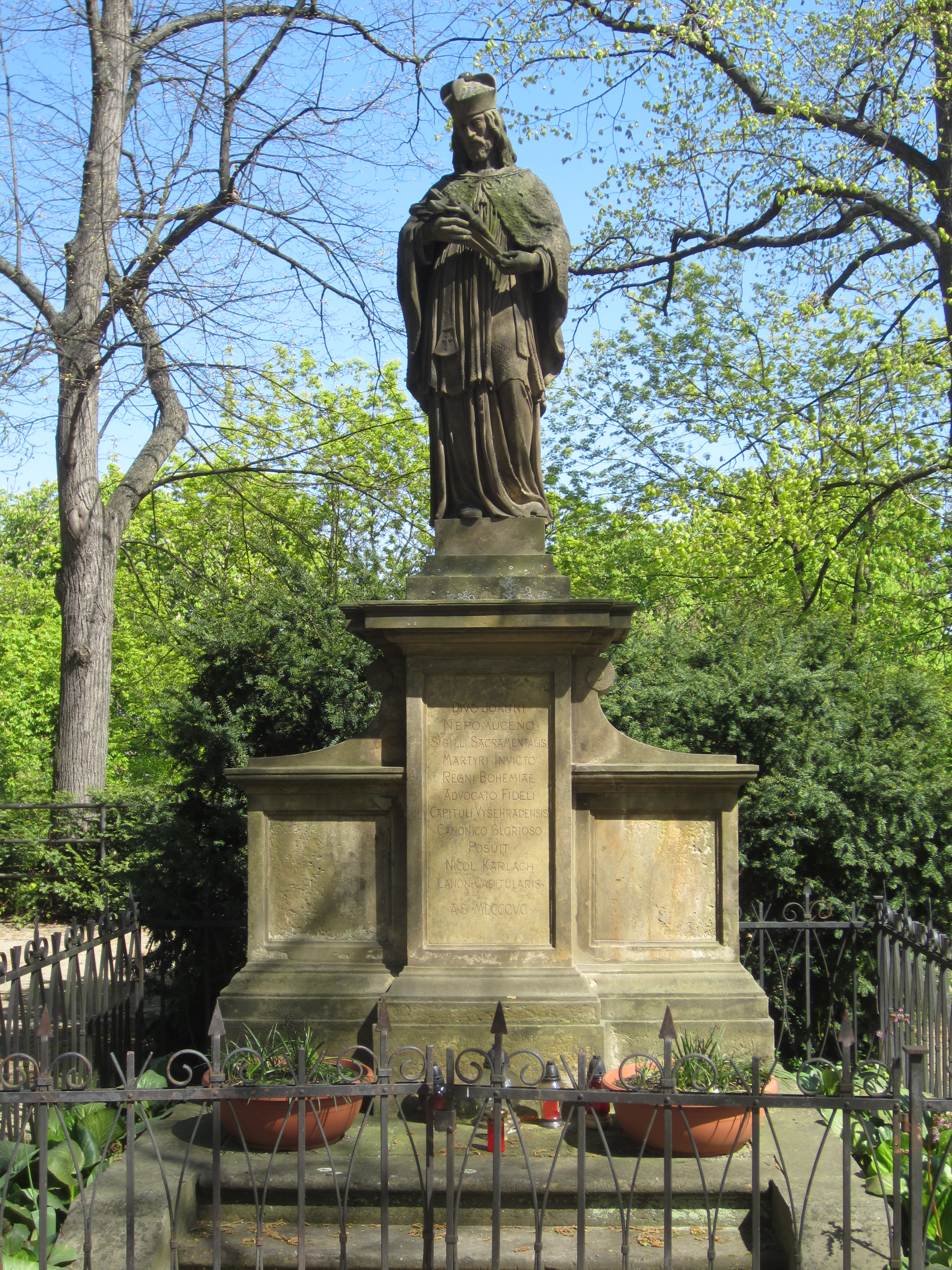
- The statue in 2016
- Type: Sculpture
- Subject: John of Nepomuk
- Location: Prague, Czech Republic

The statue of John of Nepomuk (Czech: Socha svatého Jana Nepomuckého) is installed at Vyšehrad in Prague, Czech Republic.
