= Poctol, San Juan, Batangas =

Barangay in San Juan, Batangas, Philippines

Poctol Barangay ng Poctol Barrio de Poctol
- Barangay
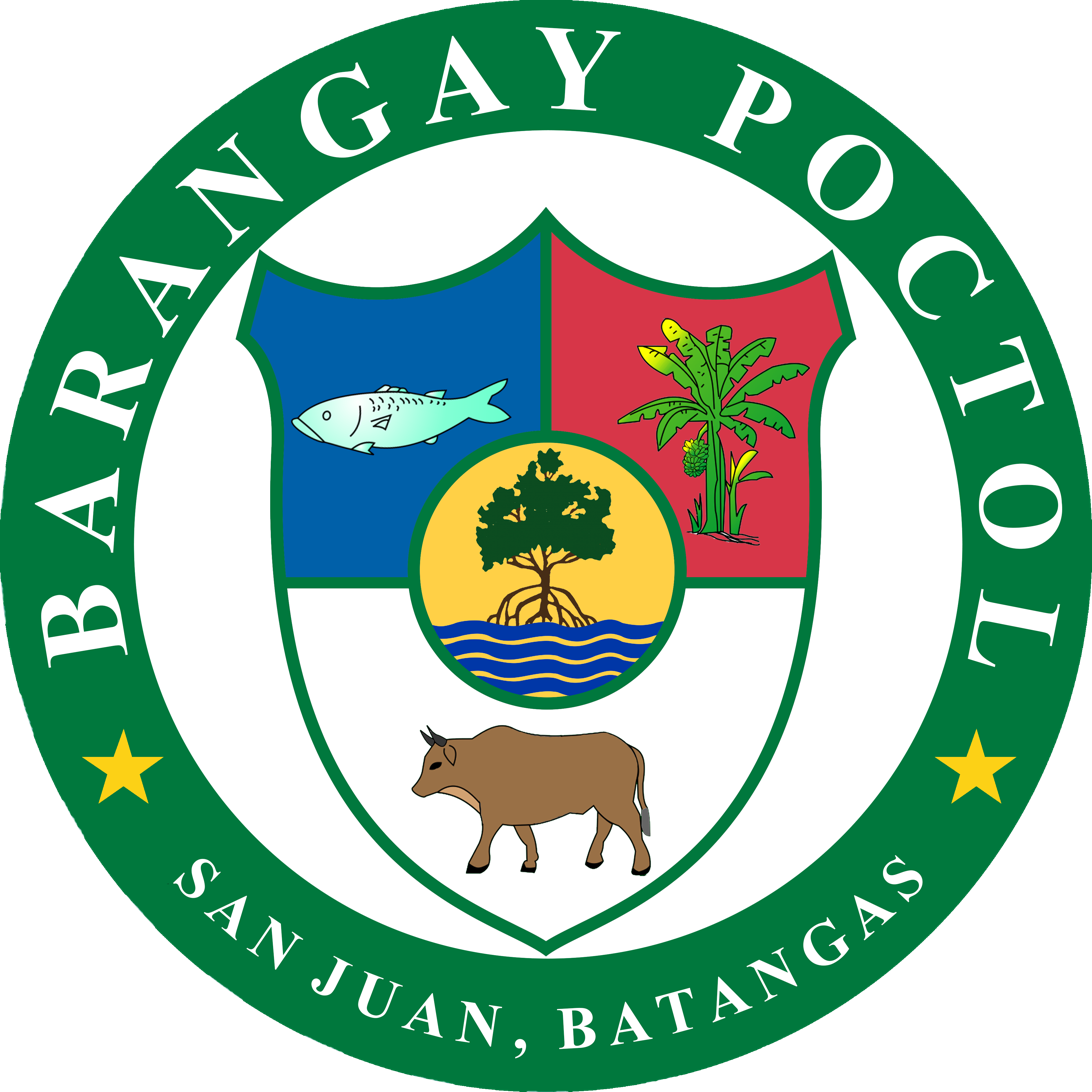
- Seal

- Location within Calabarzon
- Coordinates: 13°49′15″N 121°26′30″E
- Country: Philippines
- Region: Calabarzon
- Municipality: San Juan, Batangas
- District: 4th District

Government
  - Type: Barangay
  - Punong Barangay: Ronel B. Sinag

Area
  - Total: 5.126 km^{2} (1.979 sq mi)

Population (2024)
  - Total: 2,983
- Time zone: UTC+8 (PST)
- Postal Code: 4226
- Area code: 43

Poctol, officially the Barangay Poctol; Filipino: Barangay ng Poctol, is one of the 42 barangays of San Juan, Batangas in the Philippines. As of 2024, it has a population of 2,983.

== Origin ==
According to a legend, a long time ago, this area was a vast expanse of forest. Within it flowed a small stream known as Putol na sapa, so named because its origin and endpoint were a mystery to the local people. One intriguing aspect was the abundance of fish within its waters. During dry spells, the stream would diminish, causing the fish and plants to vanish. However, with the return of rainy days, life would once again flourish within its banks. As time went on, the name of the place underwent a transformation. Putol na sapa became known as POCTOL.

Barangay Tipas and Barangay Palingowak, both component barangays of San Juan, were once part of Barangay Poctol, which is considered as one of the oldest barrios in the town.

== Geography ==
Poctol is bounded on the north by Malaking Ilog and Municipality of Sariaya, to the east by portion of Tayabas Bay and Barangay Catmon, to the south by Barangays Pinagbayanan and Balagbag, and on the west by Barangays Tipas and Palingowak.

== Demographics ==
Population census of Poctol
| Year | Pop. | ±% p.a. |
|---|---|---|
| 2007 | 1,935 | — |
| 2010 | 2,216 | +5.06% |
| 2015 | 2,548 | +2.69% |
| 2020 | 3,028 | +3.70% |
| 2024 | 2,983 | −0.36% |
Source: Philippine Statistics Authority

== Tourism ==
Barangay Poctol belongs to the agri-tourism and nature tourism zone of San Juan. It has scenic views, mangroves and agricultural farms that can be visited by the tourists.

== Notable personalities ==
- Salvador Q. Quizon † – Auxiliary Bishop Emeritus (1979-2002) of the Archdiocese of Lipa

== Barangay and Sangguniang Kabataan officials ==
=== Members of Sangguniang Barangay ===
| Title | Name |
|---|---|
| Barangay Captain; Punong Barangay | Ronel B. Sinag |
| SK Chairperson; Sangguniang Kabataan | Jane Marie A. Ilagan |
| Secretary; Kalihim | Ryan R. Magadia |
| Treasurer; Ingat Yaman | Michelle A. Macatangay |
| Barangay Councilors; Kagawad | Ariel Gutierrez |
| Barangay Councilors; Kagawad | Ruben Escaro |
| Barangay Councilors; Kagawad | Fe Sinag - Linao |
| Barangay Councilors; Kagawad | Reynaldo Salimo |
| Barangay Councilors; Kagawad | Fermin Sotengco |
| Barangay Councilors; Kagawad | Bernardo Gamo |
| Barangay Councilors; Kagawad | Joelito Giron |

The new Barangay and SK Councils were elected on October 31, 2023.
