= Pinagbayanan excavation =

The Pinagbayanan Excavation is an archaeological site excavated by the University of the Philippines - Archaeological Studies Program (UP-ASP) in San Juan, Batangas.The site was worked on numerous times through the years 2008 to 2012, during which the remains of an old church, two stone houses, and a number of stone features indicating the previous location of a town during the Spanish colonial period in the Philippines were found. The study was meant to investigate the material history of the church, from its construction to its abandonment, and to compare it to the other stone structures in the area and to the architecture of other churches from the same time period. It was also meant to provide archaeological evidence relating to the settlement history of San Juan.

== Brief background ==
In 1890, the town of San Juan was relocated 7 kilometers inland due to constant flooding. This new town is known in modern times as Calit-Calit. The area they left behind was called Pinagbayanan, where the remains of old stone structures were found through a survey. The old method of town building used by the Spanish colonizers in the Philippines was to create a central plaza, a communal space for activities, around which all of the main structures such as the town hall and the church would be placed. The residences and other buildings would then be built outwards from this center, with the houses of the wealthy usually being situated closer to the plaza. This method was a means of reduccion. Reduccion refers to the concentration of the colonized people within a single area to ease the policing and the process of conversion to Christianity.

== Excavated materials ==
The materials excavated in the area include the old church, two stone houses located southeast of the church, the location of a limestone kiln, a set of adobe pavers, a tarangkahan and a koloong.

=== Old church ===
Excavation revealed that the pillars, first recorded in 2008, belong to an old church, on account of the presence of a buttress on one of the pillars, characteristic of churches at the time, and evidence of marks on some pillars meant to hold arches. The areas where the altar and the nave would have been situated were also found, though no belfry was discovered. It was speculated to have been constructed by Augustinian Recollects, who were responsible for the construction of the church currently in use further inland. The construction methods used include buhos, which is the pouring of lime mortar and aggregate matter between the blocks of volcanic tuff used as construction material, and the use of masonry walls. No artifacts were found deep enough in the soil to imply use or habitation of the structure, and no square nails (typical of roof construction at the time) were found. Many parts were also absent of any evidence of walling, indicating that the structure was abandoned before construction could be completed. Some flood deposits were also found in the soil layer where the surface would have been at the time of construction, implying that flooding may have hampered construction, and accounting for the atypical shape of the church, which may have been attempts to modify the structure as necessary to counteract the floods.

This church was replaced by the San Juan de Nepomuceno Church after town's transfer. This new church was built 1894 and has its bell tower in 1930.

=== Stone houses ===
Two stone houses, excavated from 2009 to 2011 were found 140 meters southeast of the church structure. These are thought to belong to the local elite before the town moved further inland to avoid flooding. Unlike the church, there were no significant amount of flood deposits found in the stone houses, which may indicate habitation in the sense that these flood deposits must have been swept out of the house.

=== Other structures ===
Other structures found include a circular presence next to the church, once thought to be the belfry, but later revealed to be a limestone kiln. An assortment of adobe pavers in an "L" shape were also found some distance from the structure. There was also a koloong, a sort of water source, found nearby.

=== Glass Artifacts ===
The UP-ASP (Batch 2010–2011) excavation from April to May 2011 supervised by Dr. Grace Barretto-Tesoro was located at the Spanish-era stone house in San Juan, Batangas where ceramic shards, metal fragments, glass vessels, and glass shards were collected. In the midden contexts of the pit, 328 glass shard artifacts had been recovered, providing enough specimens to be studied for understanding the history of the place.

The glass shards recovered in the Pinagbayanan excavation were found to be composed of Silica (SiO_{2}), Sodium oxide (Na_{2}O), and Calcium oxide (CaO). The experimental analysis of the glass shards began by sorting them according to their color and then by the context they were found, in order to determine the spatial and temporal distribution of the glass in the site that could help in fitting the parts back together. Next, to identify the function of the glass shards found, guide books to bottle were consulted such as (Digger Odell Publications 2001; Dust of the Bottle 2011; Grossmann 2002; Harris 2006; Historic Glass Bottle Identification and Information Website; Keane 2008; Lindsey 2010; Lorrain 1968; Macfarlane and Martin 2004; Polak 2005, 2007; Schroy 2007, 2008;The Bottle Guide; Wine Bottle). For more accurate information about the glass fragments, the UP-ASP checked the documents at the National Archives of the Philippines and the Bote't Dyaryo Museum at Escolta in Manila in 2011 for references. The next step of the experiment was to classify the artifacts into three divisions which is flat glass, message on bottle, lippy finish, touching base, and whole bottles, and to analyze each to gather more information about the glass artifacts.

Analysis determined that the glass shards were medicine bottle, ink bottle, wine bottle, and flat glass. The UP-ASP also found out that these bottles functioned as vessels for imported contents like medicine, pornade, and shoe polish, and most of it contained a foreign product, Palanca liquor. The dating experiment conducted shows that the estimated age of the glass shards places them from 1870 or in the latter half of the 19th century. By the help of the historical research, the UP-ASP concluded that the Spanish-era stone house in San Juan, Batangas was built after 1881. Moreover, the presence of medicinal bottles implies that people might have acted in preventing and countering diseases which were widespread in the 19th century.
