= Franz Xaver Palko =

German painter

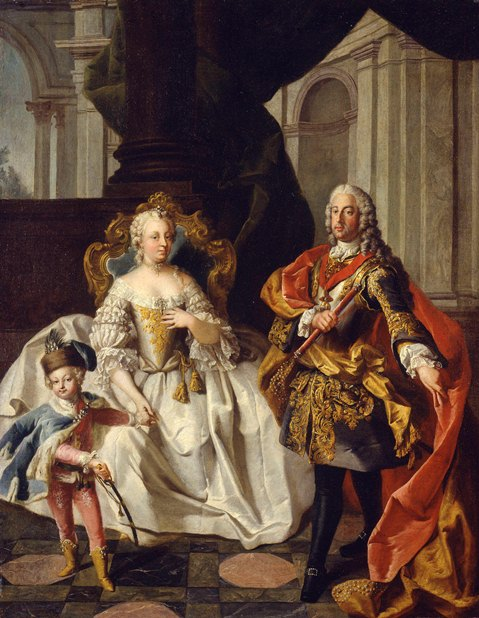
Family Portrait: Maria Theresa with Emperor Francis I and Joseph (later, Emperor Joseph II)

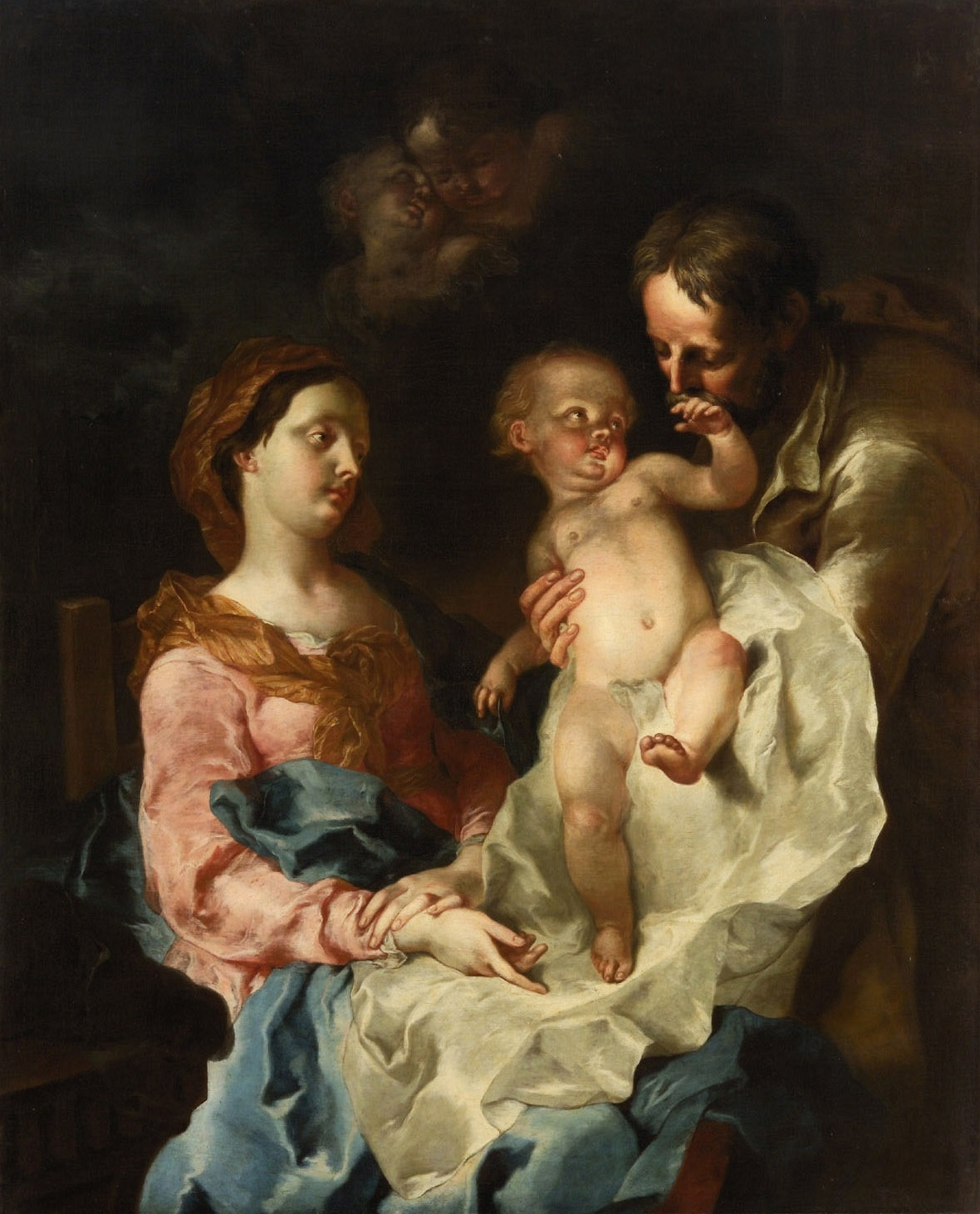
The Holy Family

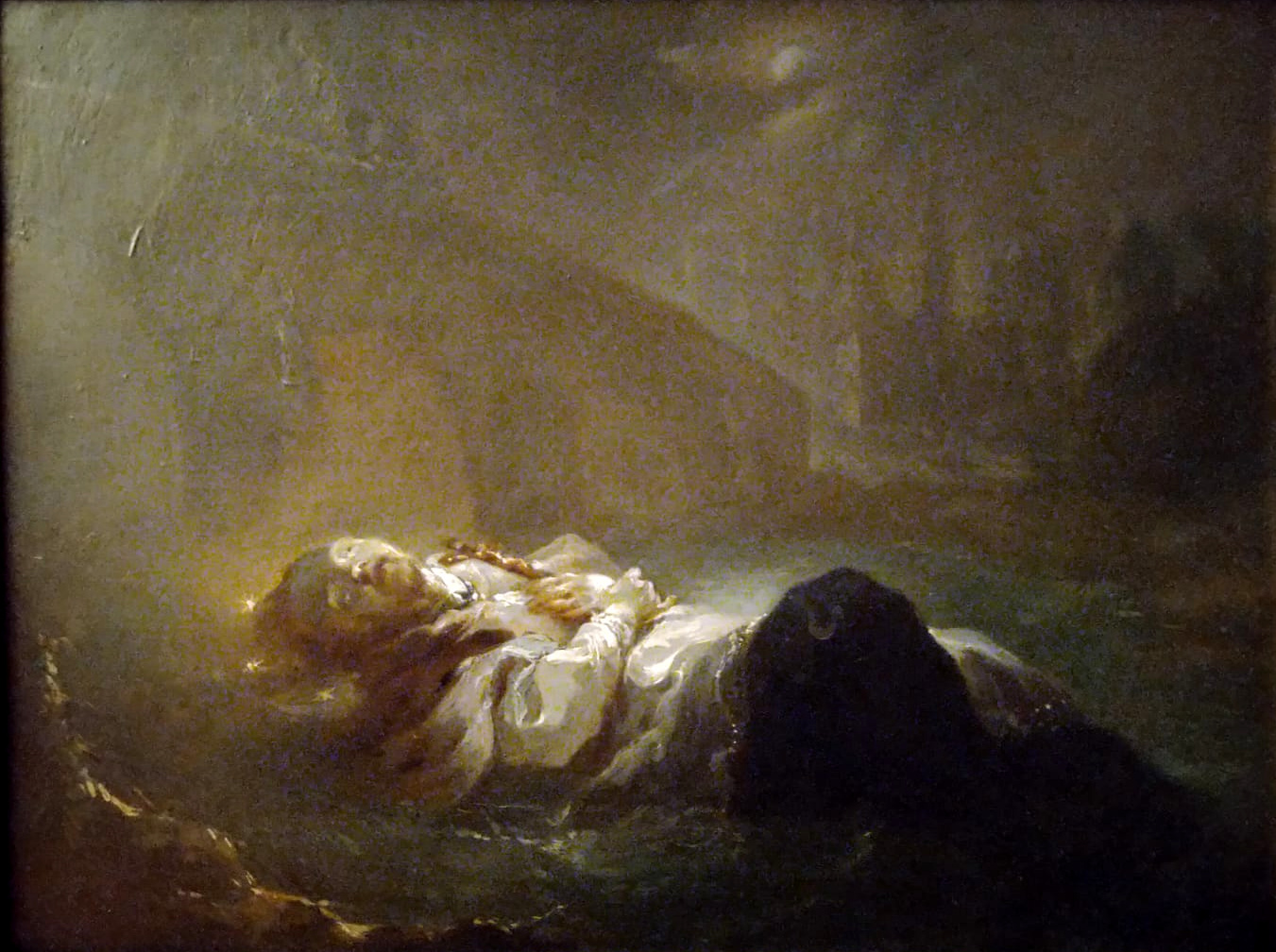
The Dead Body of John of Nepomuk ca 1760

Franz Xaver Karl Palko (3 March 1724 – c. 1767) was a Silesian painter; known primarily for religious scenes, although he also did portraits and engravings.

== Biography ==
He was born in Breslau. He was the son of a painter named Anton Palko (died 1754), about whom little is known. He began his studies at home, then went to Vienna, where he studied at the Academy of Fine Arts. In the 1740s, he was enrolled at the Accademia di Belle Arti di Venezia and came under the influence of Giuseppe Crespi. After returning, he worked in Bratislava, Kroměříž and Brno; finally settling in Dresden, where he painted frescoes depicting the life of Saint John of Nepomuk.

In 1752, Palko was appointed a court painter for the Electorate of Saxony, but moved on to Prague before a year was over, having received a commission from the Society of Jesus to paint frescoes at St. Nicholas Church. However, the Painter's Guild protested, noting that he was neither a guild member nor a citizen of Prague and was therefore undesirable. The following year, a Magistrate ruled that he could finish his work, on the grounds that being a court painter was equivalent to guild membership.

Palko never became a citizen of Prague, but stayed there for many years. Most of his works appear to have been frescoes or altarpieces. At some point, he was married, as there are baptismal records for a son, Jan Xaver, dating from 1756. The mother's name is given as Marie Anna Bursch, from Saxony.

Exact information regarding his death is not available. He apparently died in Prague in 1767, although other sources indicate that he moved to Munich in hopes of becoming a court painter for the Electorate of Bavaria, but was unsuccessful and died there, in poverty, in 1770.

His brother, Franz Anton Palko was also a well-known painter.
