= Laiya Beach =

Beach in San Juan, Batangas, Philippines

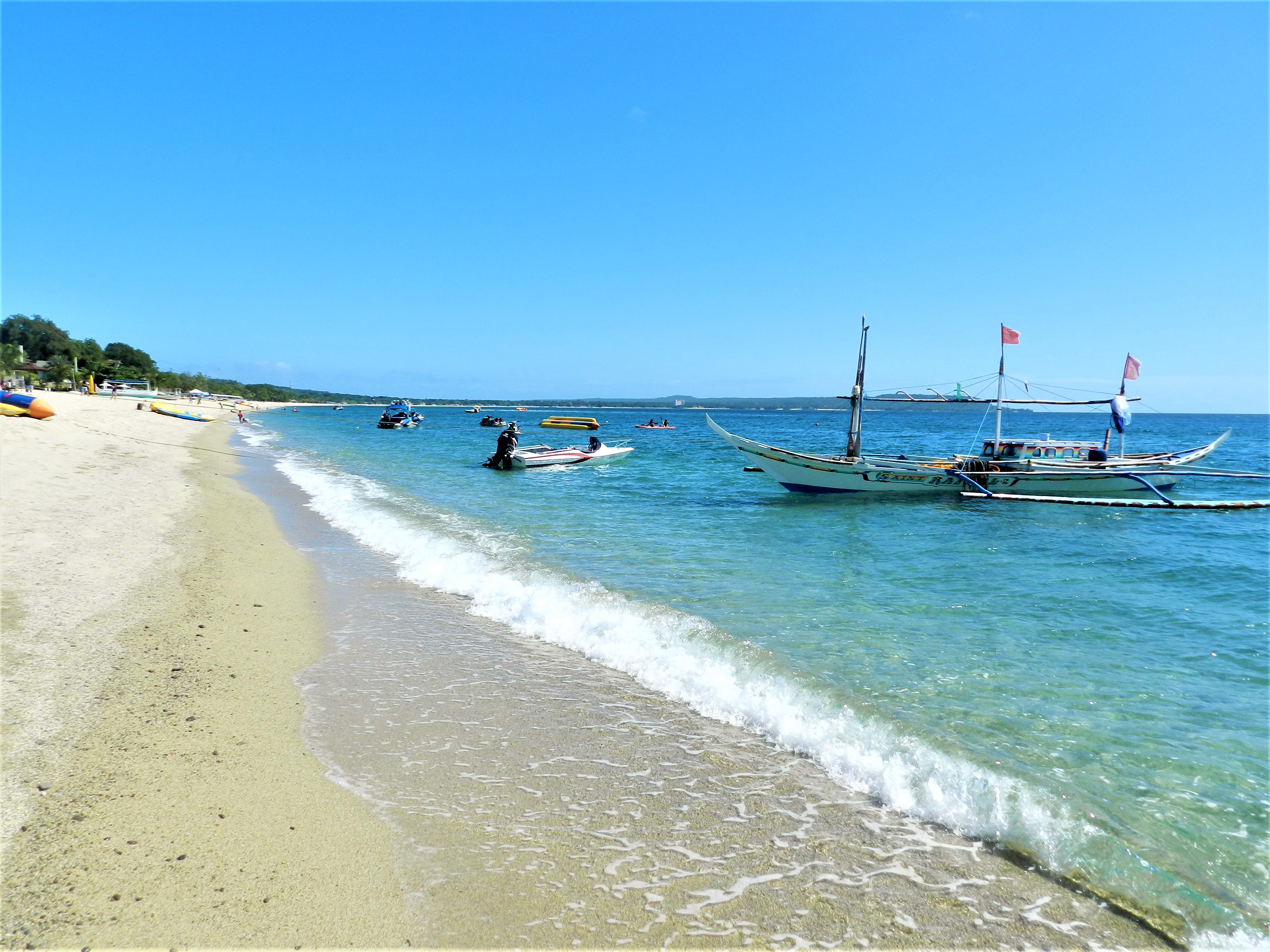
- Laiya Beach
- Interactive map of Laiya Beach

Geography
- Coordinates: 13°39′48″N 121°26′15″E
- Archipelago: Luzon

Administration
- Philippines
- Region: Southern Luzon
- Province: Batangas
- Municipality: San Juan, Batangas

Laiya Beach (Tagalog pronunciation: [lɐˈʔi.a]) is a beach destination in San Juan, Batangas, Philippines. It is one of the most visited beaches in the country.

The beach's sand is composed of weathering-formed crushed shells.

Banana boat and jet ski services are offered to people staying in resorts. Fishing boats are also frequently seen near the shores; most of the catch of the fishermen are sold directly to resorts. Vendors roam the beaches, selling souvenir items such as bracelets and butterfly knives (Batangas Tagalog: balisong).
