= Chapel of St. John of Nepomuk, Zawiercie =

Coordinates: 50.4932°N 19.4943°E

Chapel of St. John of Nepomuk
- Kaplica świętego Jana Nepomucena
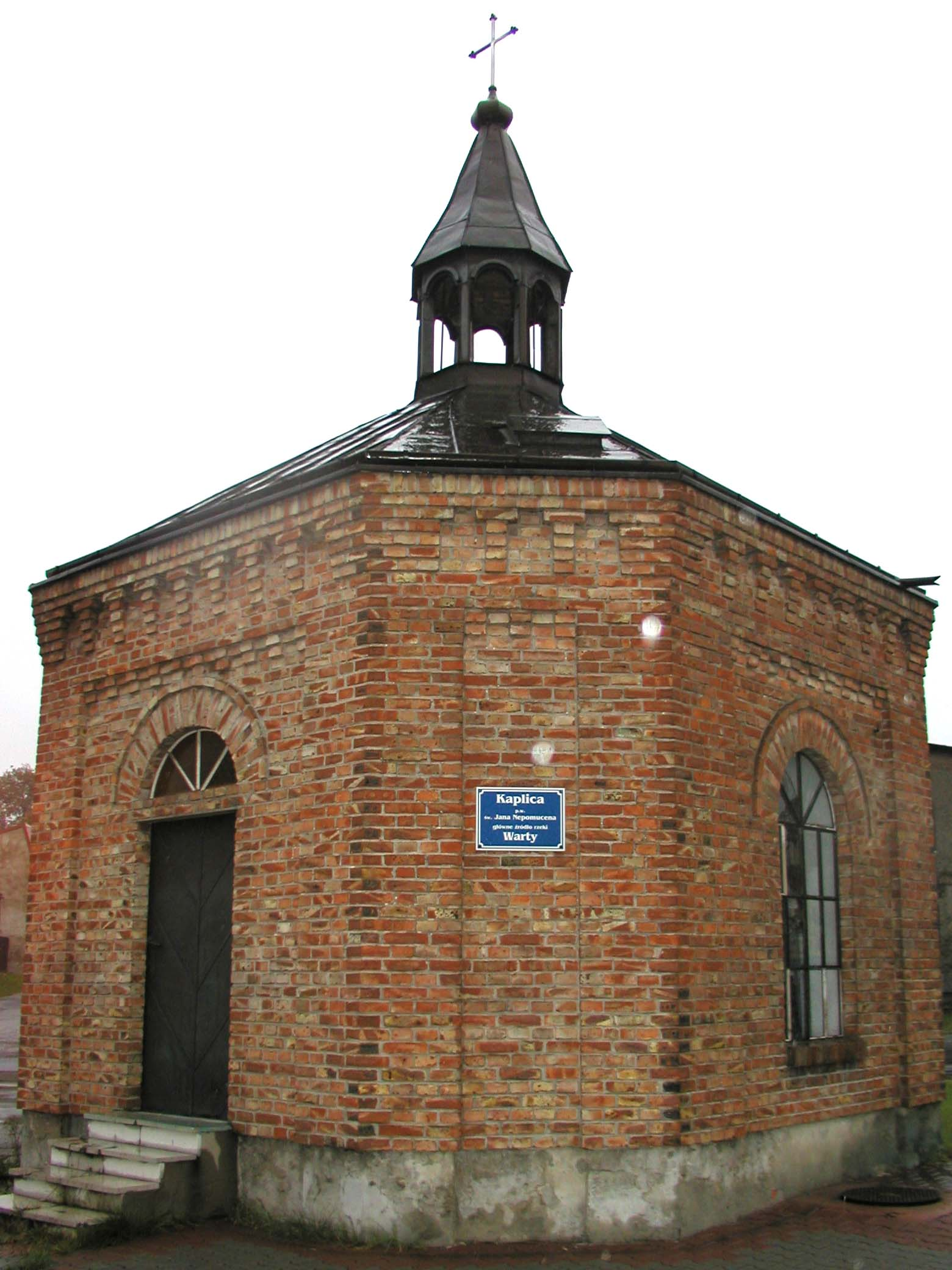
- Chapel of St. John of Nepomuk
- Location: Zawiercie
- Country: Poland
- Denomination: Roman Catholic

Architecture
- Completed: 1803

Specifications
- Materials: Brick

The Chapel of St. John of Nepomuk is a chapel located in the Krołomów borough of Zawiercie, over the source of the River Warta in Poland.

== History ==
An early chapel at the same location burned down due to a fire in 1790. The current chapel was built in 1803, and remained untouched until 1988, when due to the raising of the roads, the chapel was demounted, and raised one metre. After its location was decided, the chapel was rebuilt to its early form.

== Architecture ==
The chapel, built from brick, is in the shape of an eight-sided octagonal prism. The chapel's roof is made of sheet metal, while the chapel's tower is finished with a cross. Inside the chapel, there is an altar, where above there is a painting of St. Thecla, to the left lies a statue of St. Jacek, while on the right, there is a statue of John of Nepomuk.

=== Source of the River Warta ===
The River Warta flows close by the chapel. The chapel is closed on a daily basis. In 1920 and 1966, the River Warta's high water levels reached mid-height on many of the surrounding buildings in the borough.
