= Batangas Eastern Colleges =

Private college in Batangas, Philippines

- Former names: Bolbok Institute (1940–41); Batangas Eastern Academy (1941–2008)
- Motto: Prosperity, Happiness, and Peace
- Type: Private school, Non-sectarian, Coeducational
- Established: March 16, 1940
- Chairman: Jose Carmelino V. Quizon
- President: Jenny R. Salud
- Principal: Sharon Ann A. Alday (Elementary); Marianne Mindanao-Masangkay (Junior High; acting); Mhabel H. De Chavez (Senior High; acting)
- Dean: Renalyn B. Almario; Atty. Pio J. Calingasan (assistant dean)
- Location: 2 Javier St., Poblacion, San Juan, Batangas, San Juan, Batangas, Philippines; 13°49′43″N 121°23′45″E
- Campus: Urban
- Colors: Maroon and gold
- Nickname: Beacon
- Website: bec.edu.ph
- Location within Luzon Location within Philippines

Batangas Eastern Colleges (BEC), formerly known as Batangas Eastern Academy (BEA), is a private, co-educational, non-sectarian school in San Juan, Batangas, Philippines. Founded on March 16, 1940, it is the oldest high school in San Juan as well as being the oldest private educational institution in the town. Its school ID number is 401647.

== History ==
=== Formation years and World War II ===
Batangas Eastern Colleges was founded on March 16, 1940, as "Bolbok Institute" by Mercedes Salud-de Villa and Iñigo Javier. The institution was known to be the first high school established in the town of San Juan. The first classes started on June 12, 1940, with a total of 112 students being initially enrolled. Immediately, it was renamed "Batangas Eastern Academy". In 1941, the school was given a permit to operate as a complete high school by the Bureau of Private Schools. The enrollment grew to almost 200 students with the launch of third-year and fourth-year classes.

With the advent of the Japanese invasion of the Philippines, all schools, including the Batangas Eastern Academy, were forced to shut down. All of the equipment and materials were transferred and hidden on the farms owned by the family of the foundress, due to the news of fears that the Japanese soldiers would commit atrocities like ransacking, looting, and burning down the establishments and households. On April 4, 1945, the town of San Juan was liberated by the combined Filipino and American soldiers and guerillas. Sadly, Iñigo Javier, the school's founder who was notable for establishing the first high school in San Juan, was killed by the Japanese soldiers.

=== Post-war years (1945 to 1972) ===
After the country was liberated in 1945 from the Japanese occupation, Batangas Eastern Academy resumed its operations to the students from San Juan, Batangas, and its neighboring towns, primarily the town of Rosario in Batangas and the towns of Tiaong and Sariaya in Quezon. On June 13, 1946, the school was again officially recognized as a complete high school. In 1947, it branched to the barangays of Buhaynasapa in 1947 and Laiya in 1951. However, these were not found to be financially feasible for the school, leading to its closure. The Buhaynasapa branch of the school operated until 1953.

In 1947, the school established the College Department, which offered Junior Normal College courses that would lead to having an ETC (Elementary Teacher Certificate) for aspiring teachers and a Training Department for students from grades one to six. However, in 1958, the school stopped offering college-level courses as it began to focus on the operations of the high school department, which resulted from an increased number of enrollees in the said division. The college department remained dormant for the next twelve years. In 1970, the said department was revived and began offering two-year college courses in arts and science. Unfortunately, on September 21, 1972, due to the declaration of Martial Law by then-President Ferdinand Marcos, all schools were forced to be closed, leading to BEA's college department becoming dormant until 2003.

=== Martial law years and beyond ===
In the school year 1991–1992, the Batangas Eastern Academy formed a day-care center on its campus, pioneered by then-Barangay Captain of Poblacion, Joaquin M. Salud (Libertad's husband), with support from the Department of Social Welfare and Development (DSWD). In the school year 1992–1993, the first Kindergarten classes began their operations and began the formation of the school's pre-elementary and elementary school departments, and the permits for operating these divisions were secured. On April 13, 1998, the pre-elementary and elementary school departments of Batangas Eastern Academy were recognized as a complete Elementary School by the government.

== Key people ==
=== Presidents ===
Tenure	President	Note(s)
June 1940 – October 1946; 1954–1956	Atty. Jose M. Contreras	
November 1946 – April 1954	Mr. Eusebio Lopez	
May 1956 – July 1956	Mr. Fidel Alday	Interim
1956–1985	Mrs. Mercedes S. De Villa	
1985–1991	Mr. Jesus S. De Villa	
July 1991 – August 1999	Mrs. Libertad V. Salud	Also served as Principal of the high school department from 1955 to 2000.
September 1999 – May 2001	Dr. Mario S. De Villa	
2001–2008	Atty. Agileo S. De Villa	
2008–2020	Katherine Johanna V. Maravilla	Daughter of former DND Secretary and AFP general Renato S. De Villa.
2020-	Prof. Agerico M. De Villa	Professor of the University of the Philippines
Source: The History of Batangas Eastern Colleges

== Notable people ==
=== Alumni ===
- Gen. Renato S. De Villa, Secretary of National Defense (1991–97)
- Abelardo S. De Villa, Mayor of San Juan, Batangas (1986–1998)
- Dr. Mario S. De Villa, General Surgeon of Manila Doctor's Hospital
- Rodolfo H. Manalo, Mayor of San Juan, Batangas (1998–2007; 2010–2019)
- Amado "Gat" Inciong, labor rights advocate and former undersecretary of labor

== Incidents ==
- 32 students, all members of the Girl Scouts, were injured after they crossed an old hanging bridge near the town's public market which would later collapse after its steel cables snapped.
- Six classrooms, located within the elementary school campus, were razed by a fire on the night of March 3, 2024. There were no reported casualties.

== Sister schools ==
- Tayabas Western Academy (Candelaria, Quezon)
