= Joseph Marello Institute =

Roman Catholic high school in Batangas, Philippines

Joseph Marello Institute, Inc. (Oblates of St. Joseph)
- Instituto de San Giuseppe Marello
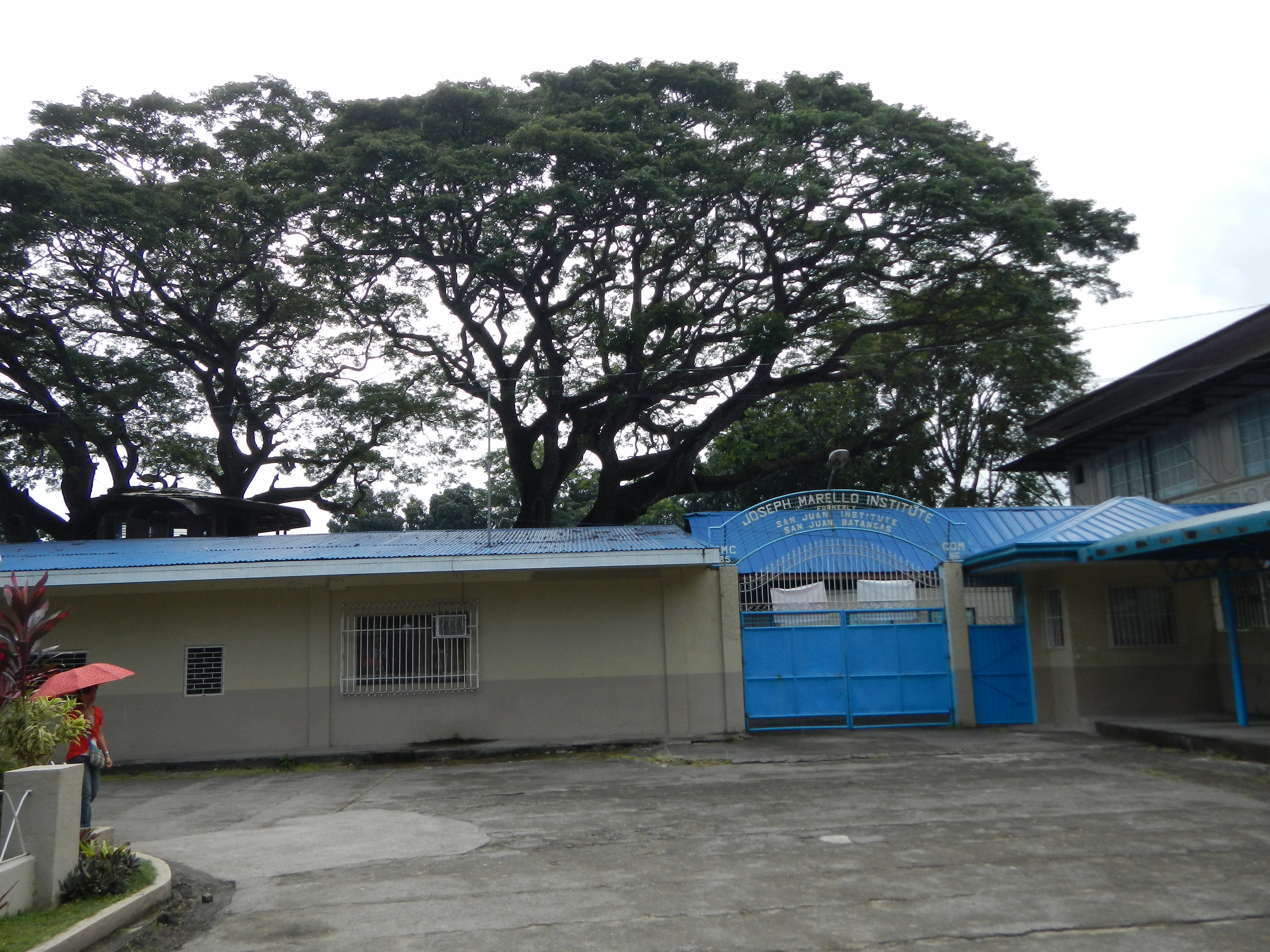
- Facade and gate of JMI
- Type: Private School, Sectarian
- Established: 1947 as San Juan Institute; 1963 as San Juan Institute Recoletos; 1978 as Joseph Marello Institute
- Principal: Mrs. Julumin B. Ladao
- Director: Rev. Fr. Erwin S. Mendoza, OSJ
- Location: San Juan, Batangas, Philippines; 13°49′42″N 121°23′40″E
- Campus: Urban
- Colors: Blue
- Nickname: JMI
- Website: osjphil.org/schoolsjmi.php

Joseph Marello Institute, Inc (Oblates of St. Joseph), also known as JMI, is a private Catholic School (Elementary, Secondary School) located at P. Burgos St., Poblacion, San Juan, Batangas. It is managed by the Oblates of St. Joseph, a congregation founded by St. Joseph Marello. Its school ID number is 401650.

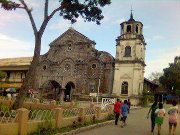
This Institution can also be seen beside San Juan’s Catholic Church. (San Juan Nepomuceno Parish)
