= San Juan, Batangas =

Municipality in Batangas, Philippines

San Juan San Juan de Bocboc
- Municipality
- Municipality of San Juan
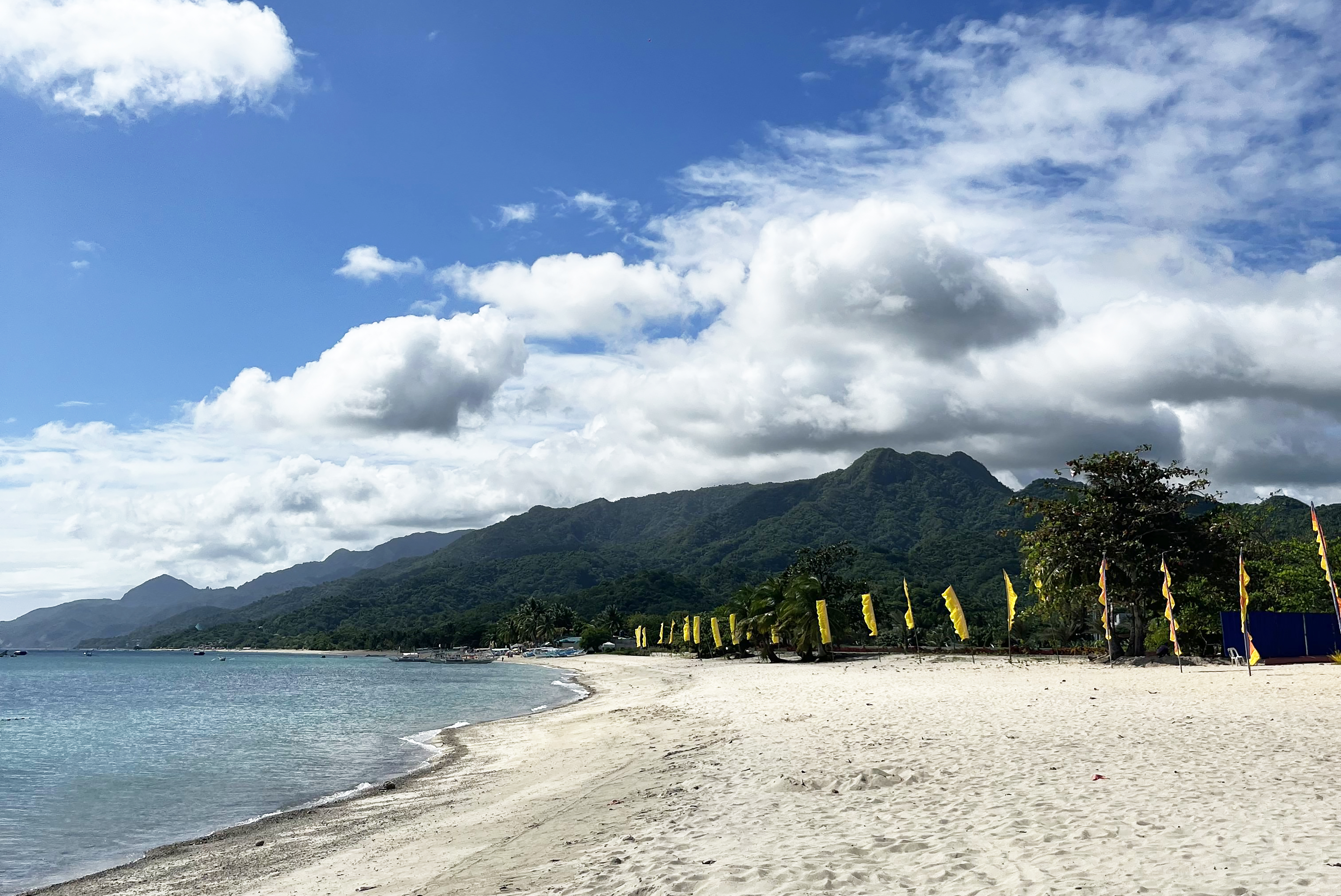
- Laiya Beach

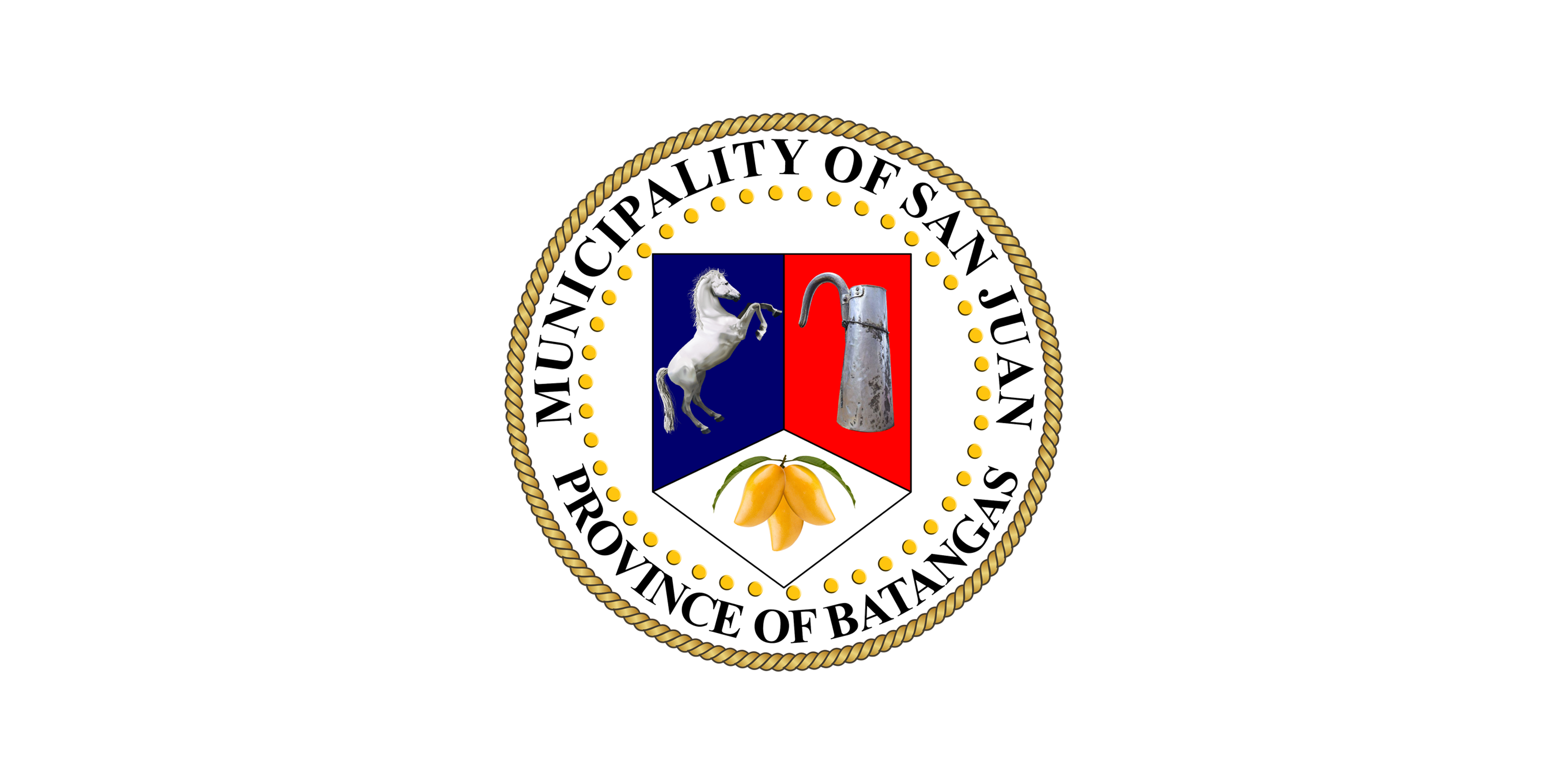
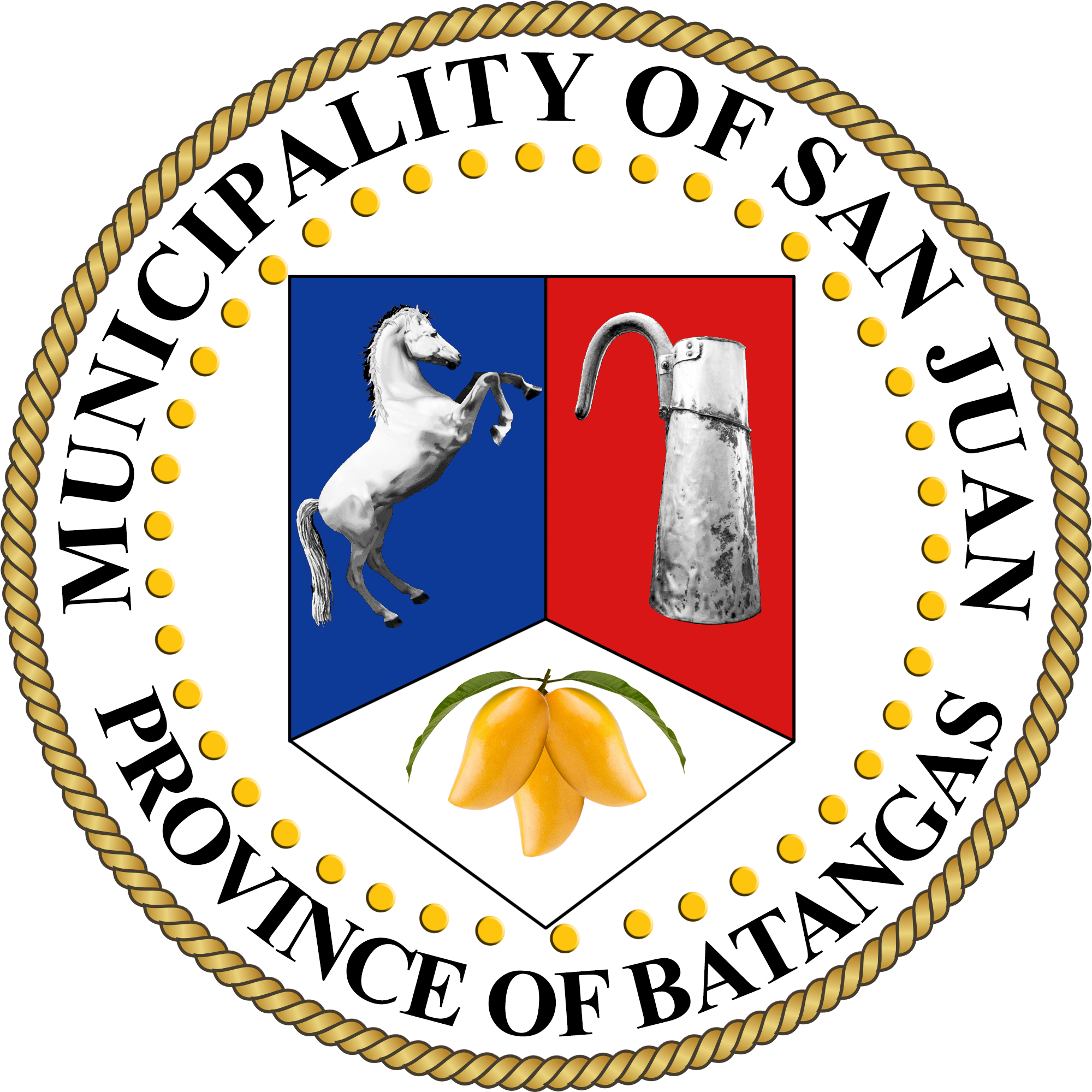
- Flag Seal
- Motto: Sama-sama Tayo sa Napapanahong Pagbabago
- Anthem: Bagong Araw (New Day)
- Map of Batangas with San Juan highlighted
- Interactive map of San Juan
- Location within the Philippines
- Coordinates: 13°49′34″N 121°23′46″E
- Country: Philippines
- Region: Calabarzon
- Province: Batangas
- District: 4th district
- Founded: December 12, 1848
- Named for: St. John of Nepomuk
- Barangays: 42 (see Barangays)

Government
  - Type: Sangguniang Bayan
  - Mayor: Ildebrando D. Salud
  - Vice Mayor: Octavio Antonio L. Marasigan
  - Representative: Amado Carlos A. Bolilia IV
  - Municipal Council: Members: Wenilo G. Ada; Angelo Luis T. Marasigan; Florencio M. De Chavez; Shalimar D. Salud; Miljun E. Magadia; Gerardo R. Tantay Jr.; Grenalyn V. Virtusio; Owen B. Manimtim
  - Electorate: 76,584 voters (2025)

Area
  - Total: 273.40 km^{2} (105.56 sq mi)
- Elevation: 23 m (75 ft)
- Highest elevation: 184 m (604 ft)
- Lowest elevation: 0 m (0 ft)

Population (2024 census)
  - Total: 115,118
  - Density: 421.06/km^{2} (1,090.5/sq mi)
  - Households: 27,553

Economy
  - Income class: 1st municipal income class
  - Poverty incidence: 10.43% (2023)
  - Revenue: ₱ 517 million (2024)
  - Assets: ₱ 1,809 million (2024)
  - Expenditure: ₱ 264.2 million (2024)
  - Liabilities: ₱ 549.8 million (2024)

Service provider
  - Electricity: Batangas 2 Electric Cooperative (BATELEC 2)
  - Water: San Juan Water District (SJWD)
  - Cable TV: Maharlika Cable Systems
- Time zone: UTC+8 (PST)
- ZIP code: 4226
- PSGC: 0401023000
- IDD : area code: +63 (0)43
- Native languages: Tagalog
- Patron saint: St. John of Nepomuk
- Website: www.sanjuanbatangas.gov.ph

San Juan, officially the Municipality of San Juan (Tagalog: Bayan ng San Juan), is a municipality in the province of Batangas, Philippines. According to the 2024 census, it has a population of 115,118 people.

It is recognized for its baroque church, ancestral houses, the Pinagbayanan excavation—considered the most significant archeological site in the municipality, and the popular Laiya Beach.

== History ==
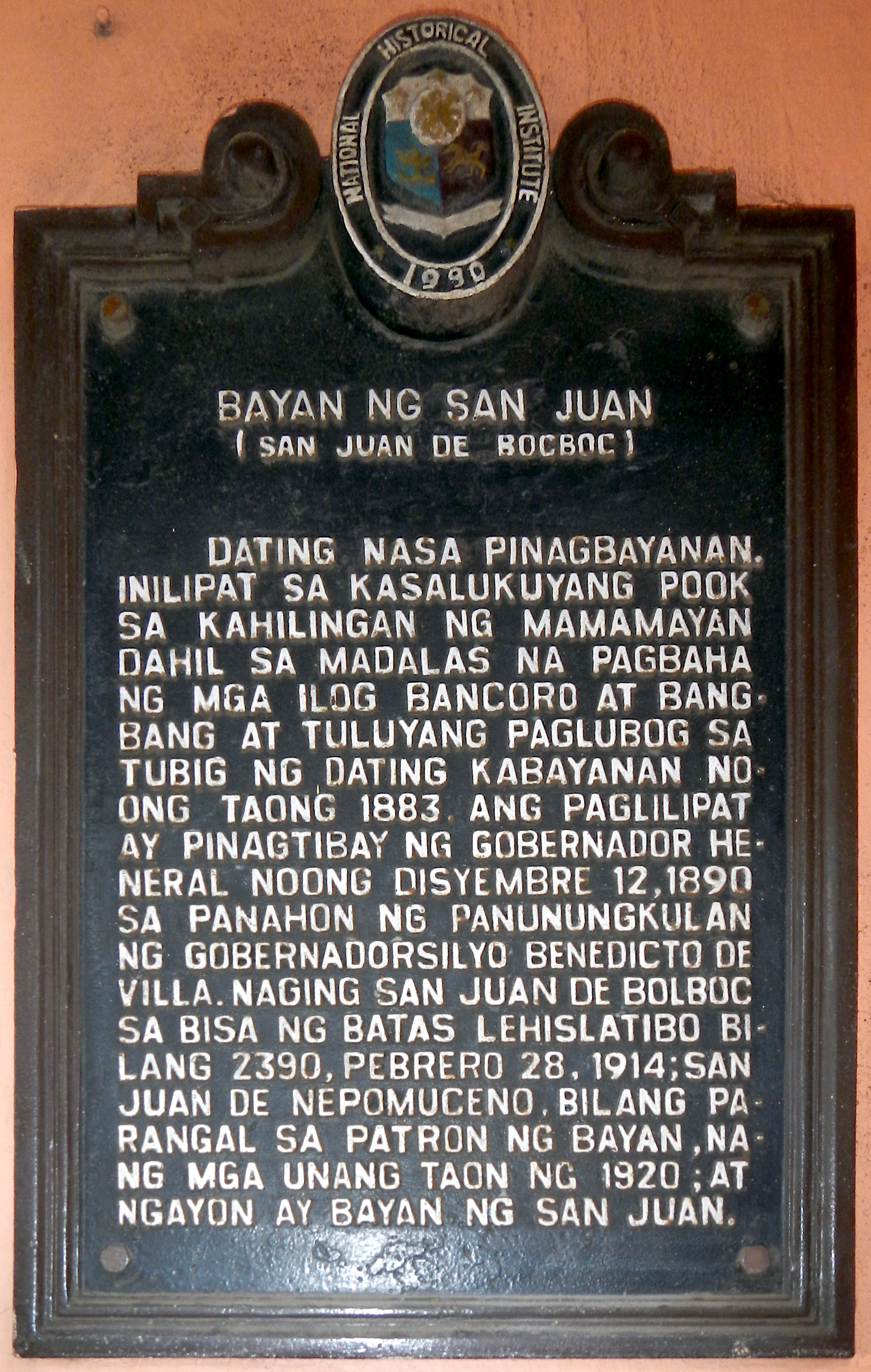
Historical marker installed in 1990 at the old municipal hall

In the years 1698 until 1836, it was just a barrio of the large town of Rosario located in the eastern part of Batangas. From 1837, the barrio was governed by tinientes or deputies with a term of one to two years. However, when the barrio was recognized as a separate town in 1843, the position of tinientes was replaced by cabezas de barangay serving one for each new barrio. It was only in 1848 when the Spanish government officially recognized the independence of San Juan from its mother town of Rosario and was given the name San Juan de Bocboc.

San Juan was headed by a Gobernadorcillo in 1864. The first Gobernadorcillo was Don Camilo Perez, a prominent citizen who initiated the separation of San Juan from Rosario. He is considered as the founder of the town, and was honored for his contribution in public works and peace and order in the newly created town.

On October 28, 1883, San Juan experienced a major disaster due to continuous winds and intense storm rain. Huge flood from the Bancoro and Bangbang Rivers hit the town resulting to the destruction of houses, drowning of livestocks and planted crops, and the devastation of the church and its convent. In 1886, the flooding become worse in the town. The parish priest had to erect a temporary church and convent in a site seven kilometers away from the town.

On January 18, 1886, the officials of the town initiated the transfer of the new town to Calitcalit. The transfer of the Lumang Bayan to its present location was approved by Governor General Valeriano Weyler on December 12, 1890, during the administration of Gobernadorcillo Benedicto De Villa. San Juan de Bocboc was renamed to Bolbok by virtue of Act No. 2390 dated February 28, 1914. On November 29, 1933, Act No. 4082 was approved renaming Bolbok to San Juan, in honor of San Juan Nepomuceno, the town's patron saint.

On April 4, 1945, the town was liberated from Japanese occupation by the F Company, 188th Infantry of the United States Army as part of their clearing operations to liberate the Bicol peninsula from the hands of the Japanese.

== Geography ==
San Juan is located at 13°49′34″N 121°23′46″E, at the easternmost part of Batangas province. North of San Juan is the neighboring town of Candelaria in Quezon province, with Malaking Ilog River defining its geographical boundary. Tayabas Bay lies east and the hills on the eastern portion separate it from the towns of Lobo and Rosario. It is 45 kilometres (28 mi) from Batangas City and 150 kilometres (93 mi) from Manila.

According to the Philippine Statistics Authority, the municipality has a land area of 273.40 square kilometres (105.56 sq mi) constituting 8.76% of the 3,119.75-square-kilometre- (1,204.54 sq mi) total area of Batangas.

=== Barangays ===
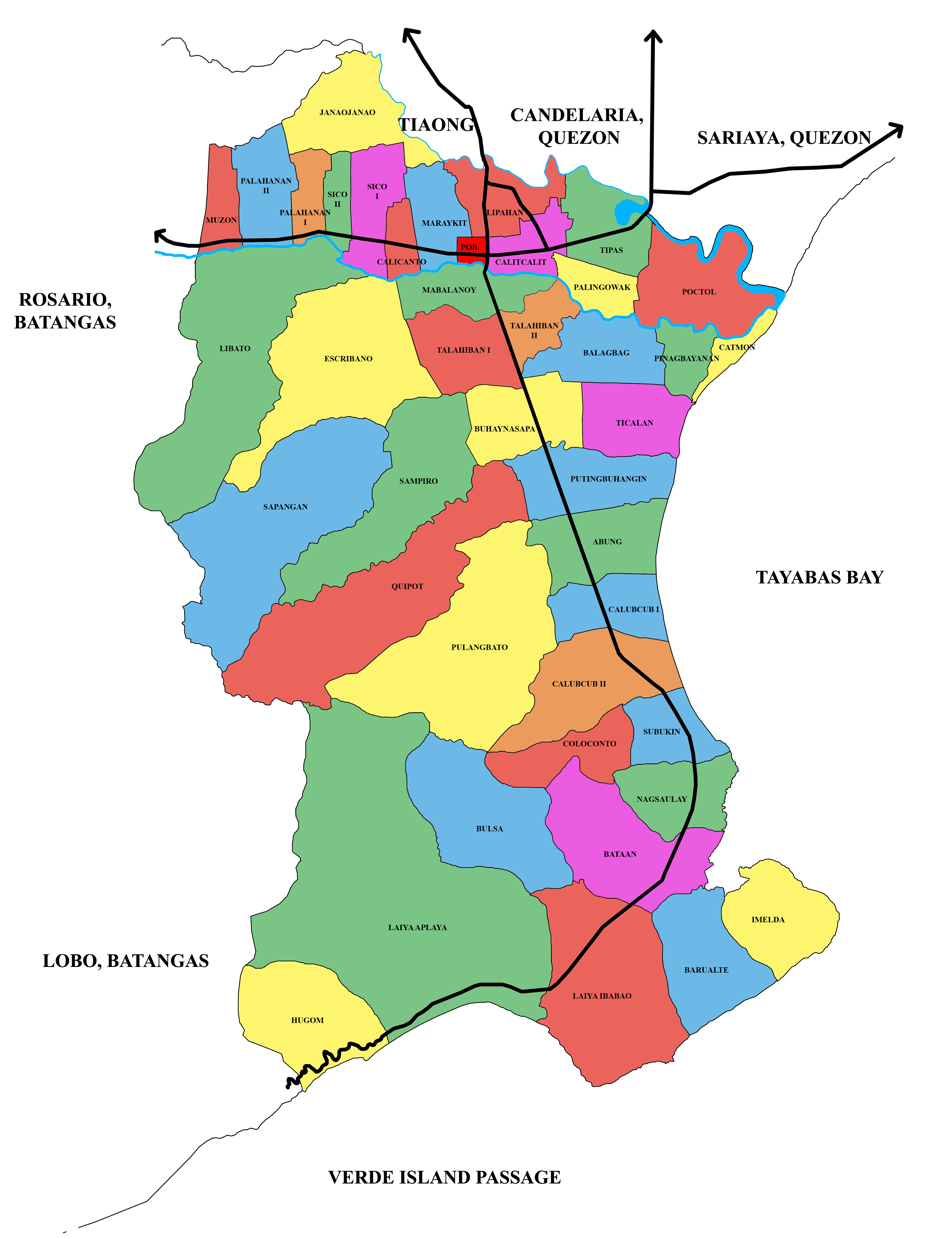
Political map of San Juan, showing the 42 barangays under its jurisdiction.

San Juan is politically subdivided into 42 barangays, as indicated in the matrix below. Each barangay consists of puroks and some have sitios.

| PSGC | Barangay | Population | | | ±% p.a. | |
| | | 2024 | | 2010 | | |
|---|---|---|---|---|---|---|
| 041023001 | Abung | 1.8% | 2,119 | 1,947 | ▴ | 0.59% |
| 041023002 | Balagbag | 2.2% | 2,539 | 2,147 | ▴ | 1.17% |
| 041023003 | Barualte | 1.5% | 1,676 | 1,389 | ▴ | 1.31% |
| 041023004 | Bataan | 1.7% | 1,911 | 1,786 | ▴ | 0.47% |
| 041023005 | Buhay na Sapa | 4.5% | 5,123 | 3,751 | ▴ | 2.19% |
| 041023006 | Bulsa | 1.9% | 2,160 | 1,543 | ▴ | 2.36% |
| 041023007 | Calicanto | 1.7% | 1,957 | 1,908 | ▴ | 0.18% |
| 041023008 | Calitcalit | 4.0% | 4,556 | 4,128 | ▴ | 0.69% |
| 041023009 | Calubcub I | 1.9% | 2,206 | 1,794 | ▴ | 1.45% |
| 041023010 | Calubcub II | 3.1% | 3,529 | 3,360 | ▴ | 0.34% |
| 041023011 | Catmon | 1.2% | 1,418 | 1,282 | ▴ | 0.70% |
| 041023012 | Coloconto | 0.7% | 758 | 702 | ▴ | 0.53% |
| 041023013 | Escribano | 2.8% | 3,255 | 2,844 | ▴ | 0.94% |
| 041023014 | Hugom | 1.4% | 1,578 | 1,301 | ▴ | 1.35% |
| 041023015 | Imelda (Tubog) | 0.8% | 959 | 909 | ▴ | 0.37% |
| 041023016 | Janaojanao | 1.3% | 1,511 | 1,466 | ▴ | 0.21% |
| 041023017 | Laiya‑Ibabao | 3.9% | 4,504 | 3,580 | ▴ | 1.61% |
| 041023018 | Laiya‑Aplaya | 5.2% | 6,005 | 5,572 | ▴ | 0.52% |
| 041023019 | Libato | 3.6% | 4,107 | 3,997 | ▴ | 0.19% |
| 041023020 | Lipahan | 3.8% | 4,380 | 3,814 | ▴ | 0.97% |
| 041023021 | Mabalanoy | 3.3% | 3,834 | 3,155 | ▴ | 1.36% |
| 041023022 | Nagsaulay | 2.3% | 2,604 | 2,404 | ▴ | 0.56% |
| 041023023 | Maraykit | 3.1% | 3,574 | 3,060 | ▴ | 1.08% |
| 041023024 | Muzon | 1.3% | 1,539 | 1,497 | ▴ | 0.19% |
| 041023025 | Palahanan I | 0.7% | 841 | 713 | ▴ | 1.15% |
| 041023026 | Palahanan II | 2.8% | 3,234 | 2,954 | ▴ | 0.63% |
| 041023027 | Palingowak | 1.4% | 1,632 | 1,469 | ▴ | 0.73% |
| 041023028 | Pinagbayanan | 1.3% | 1,508 | 1,173 | ▴ | 1.76% |
| 041023029 | Poblacion | 2.9% | 3,281 | 3,111 | ▴ | 0.37% |
| 041023030 | Poctol | 2.6% | 3,028 | 2,216 | ▴ | 2.19% |
| 041023031 | Pulangbato | 2.4% | 2,767 | 2,391 | ▴ | 1.02% |
| 041023032 | Putingbuhangin | 2.2% | 2,491 | 1,872 | ▴ | 2.00% |
| 041023033 | Quipot | 2.9% | 3,328 | 2,517 | ▴ | 1.96% |
| 041023034 | Sampiro | 2.7% | 3,151 | 2,690 | ▴ | 1.10% |
| 041023035 | Sapangan | 2.6% | 2,940 | 2,435 | ▴ | 1.32% |
| 041023036 | Sico I | 1.7% | 1,977 | 1,700 | ▴ | 1.05% |
| 041023037 | Sico II | 1.0% | 1,100 | 934 | ▴ | 1.14% |
| 041023038 | Subukin | 1.4% | 1,635 | 1,444 | ▴ | 0.87% |
| 041023039 | Talahiban I | 1.9% | 2,244 | 2,055 | ▴ | 0.61% |
| 041023040 | Talahiban II | 1.1% | 1,301 | 1,261 | ▴ | 0.22% |
| 041023041 | Ticalan | 1.6% | 1,830 | 1,486 | ▴ | 1.46% |
| 041023042 | Tipaz | 2.6% | 2,975 | 2,534 | ▴ | 1.12% |
| | Total | | 115,118 | 94,291 | ▴ | 1.39% |

=== Climate ===
Climate data for San Juan, Batangas
| Month | Jan | Feb | Mar | Apr | May | Jun | Jul | Aug | Sep | Oct | Nov | Dec | Year |
|---|---|---|---|---|---|---|---|---|---|---|---|---|---|
| Mean daily maximum °C (°F) | 27 (81) | 28 (82) | 30 (86) | 32 (90) | 31 (88) | 30 (86) | 29 (84) | 29 (84) | 29 (84) | 29 (84) | 28 (82) | 27 (81) | 29 (84) |
| Mean daily minimum °C (°F) | 21 (70) | 20 (68) | 21 (70) | 22 (72) | 24 (75) | 24 (75) | 24 (75) | 24 (75) | 24 (75) | 23 (73) | 22 (72) | 22 (72) | 23 (73) |
| Average precipitation mm (inches) | 52 (2.0) | 35 (1.4) | 27 (1.1) | 27 (1.1) | 82 (3.2) | 124 (4.9) | 163 (6.4) | 144 (5.7) | 145 (5.7) | 141 (5.6) | 100 (3.9) | 102 (4.0) | 1,142 (45) |
| Average rainy days | 12.0 | 8.1 | 8.8 | 9.7 | 17.9 | 22.6 | 26.2 | 24.5 | 24.6 | 22.0 | 16.7 | 14.9 | 208 |
Source: Meteoblue (modeled/calculated data, not measured locally)

== Demographics ==
Population census of San Juan

| Year | Pop. | ±% p.a. |
|---|---|---|
| 1903 | 11,853 | — |
| 1918 | 13,553 | +0.90% |
| 1939 | 24,837 | +2.93% |
| 1948 | 28,642 | +1.60% |
| 1960 | 36,220 | +1.98% |
| 1970 | 47,101 | +2.66% |

| Year | Pop. | ±% p.a. |
|---|---|---|
| 1975 | 52,936 | +2.37% |
| 1980 | 59,345 | +2.31% |
| 1990 | 67,741 | +1.33% |
| 1995 | 71,913 | +1.13% |
| 2000 | 78,169 | +1.80% |
| 2007 | 87,276 | +1.53% |

| Year | Pop. | ±% p.a. |
|---|---|---|
| 2010 | 94,291 | +2.85% |
| 2015 | 108,585 | +2.72% |
| 2020 | 114,068 | +1.04% |
| 2024 | 115,118 | +0.22% |

Source: Philippine Statistics Authority

In the 2024 census, San Juan had a population of 115,118 people. The population density was 420 inhabitants per square kilometre (1,100/sq mi).

== Economy ==
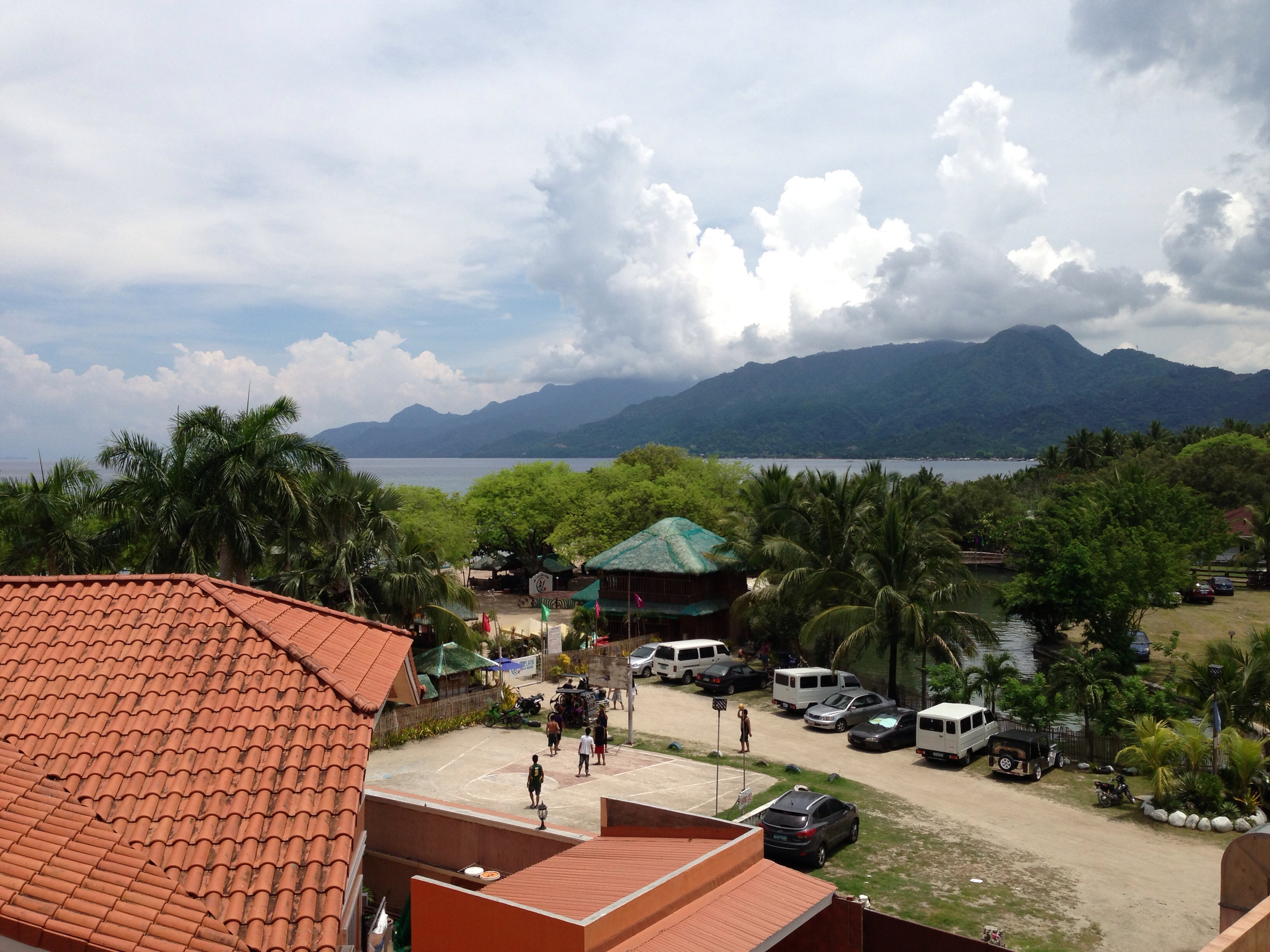
View of Tayabas Bay and the Lobo Mountain Range

Poverty incidence of San Juan (%)

Source: Philippine Statistics Authority

San Juan is a first class municipality in the province of Batangas. It is initially identified as one of the Special Economic Zones (ecozones). According to RA 7916 or the Special Economic Zone Act of 1995, ecozones are selected areas with highly developed or which have the potential to be developed into agro-industrial, industrial, tourist/recreational, commercial, banking, investment and financial centers.

San Juan is a tourist destination known for its white-sand beaches. The tourism and aquaculture industries provide jobs to the town's people and income to the town economy.

Because of its fertile land, the municipality is one of the top suppliers of agricultural products in the province.

The town has also a coconut wine and pottery industry.

=== Income ===
Here's the list of the total annual income, assets, expenses and equity of San Juan since 2015, according to the Annual Audit Reports of the Commission on Audit:

| Year | Total Annual Income | Assets | Expenses | Equity |
|---|---|---|---|---|
| 2020 | ₱527,484,244.43 ▲ | ₱888,024,559.64 ▲ | ₱431,318,667.12 ▲ | ₱771,087,559.47 ▲ |
| 2019 | ₱359,577,041.16 ▲ | ₱777,617,737.52 ▲ | ₱314,756,691.59 ▲ | ₱679,909,608.45 ▲ |
| 2018 | ₱326,581,854.00 ▲ | ₱714,378,369.54 ▲ | ₱290,098,959.77 ▲ | ₱616,441,566.44 ▲ |
| 2017 | ₱307,359,289.40 ▲ | ₱631,222,065.04 ▼ | ₱250,243,204.16 ▲ | ₱522,162,348.18 ▼ |
| 2016 | ₱258,671,588.66 ▲ | ₱634,400,575.24 ▲ | ₱208,687,514.58 ▲ | ₱532,424,224.13▲ |
| 2015 | ₱237,642,431.61 | ₱310,971,370.24 | ₱180,286,101.48 | ₱232,961,446.48 |

== Government ==
=== Government officials ===
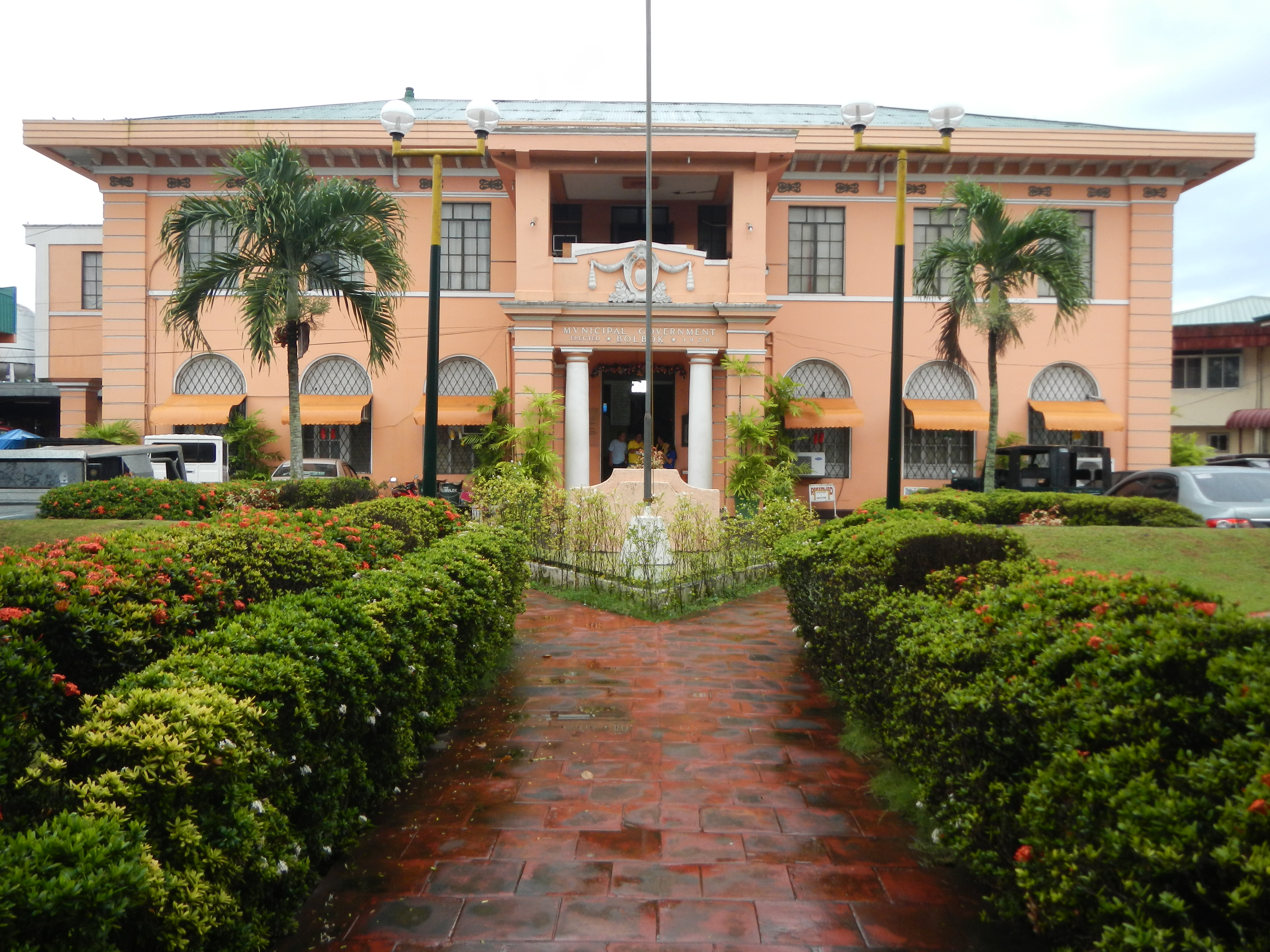
Old Municipal hall

The 2025 local elections in San Juan was held on May 12, 2025. Six municipal councilors, elected on May 9, 2022, were re-elected while the two others will serve their first term. The following are the elected government officials of San Juan. Their term will expire on June 30, 2028.

Municipal Government of San Juan (2025-2028)
Mayor
Ildebrando D. Salud
Vice Mayor
Octavio Antonio L. Marasigan
Sangguniang Bayan Members
| Wenilo G. Ada | Miljun E. Magadia |
| Angelo Luis T. Marasigan | Gerardo R. Tantay, Jr. |
| Florencio M. De Chavez | Grenalyn V. Virtusio, Ll. B. |
| Shalimar D. Salud | Owen B. Manimtim |
ABC president
Liwelyndo A. Vergara
SK Federation President
Jeryk Dwight Rafhael R. Bait

=== List of former Municipal Mayors ===
| Order | Name | Years in Office | Achievement |
|---|---|---|---|
| 1 | Don Esteban de Villa | 1900-1905 | Built the town's public market |
| 2 | Don Gregorio de Villa | 1905-1906 | Constructed the town's elementary school (Gabaldon) |
| 3 | Don Benedicto de Villa | 1906-1907 | Pioneered the town's sugar industry that brought prosperity to the town |
| 4 | Don Raymundo Balinos | 1907-1910 | Encouraged the education of the town's people |
| 5 | Don Florencio Perez | 1910-1913 | Built a public cemetery for the poor and the non-Catholics |
| 6 | Don Gregorio de Villa | 1913-1916 | |
| 7 | Don Esteban de Villa | 1916-1919 | |
| 8 | Don Juan R. Quizon | 1919-1922 | Constructed the municipal building and acquired the site for the town plaza |
| 9 | Don Nicolas Virrey | 1922-1925 | |
| 10 | Don Juan R. Quizon | 1925-1928 | |
| 11 | Don Filemon Malabanan | 1928-1934 | Built the water reservoir and worked for the electrification of the town |
| 12 | Don Miguel Lopez | 1934-1942 | Instrumental in the building of San Juan East Central School |
| 13 | Guillermo de Villa | 1942-1945 | Maintained peaceful relationship with the Japanese government while working secretly with the guerillas |
| 14 | Vicente Castillo | 1945; 1946-1955 | Built the Lawaye River Dike, and organized the town's police force |
| 15 | Jose Garcia | 1956-1963 | Built the Sampiro-Quipot feeder road |
| 16 | Estelito Castillo | 1964-1967 | Repaired municipal building, implemented the minimum wage law, and managed to acquire fire trucks from the national government |
| 17 | Vicente Lecaroz | 1968-1986 | Built feeder roads and bridges; responsible for the construction of additional school buildings; he also eradicated cattle-rustling |
| 18 | Abelardo de Villa | 1986-1998 | Electrification of barrios; built new feeder roads, new bridges and cemented road to Laiya. |
| 19 | Rodolfo Hernandez Manalo | 1998-2007 | a) Carried out the Computerization of Real Property Tax Administration and Business Permit and Licensing System. b) Built Farm to Market Roads and Bridges. |
| 20 | Danilo Salapare Mindanao | 2007-2010 | Asphalting of roads; he envisioned the cityhood of San Juan |
| 21 | Rodolfo Hernandez Manalo | 2010‑2019 | Establishment of 13 national high schools, opening of barangay roads and massive concreting of Farm To Market Roads, construction of hanging and foot bridge in various barangays, scholarships to indigent constituents from elementary to college, massive mangrove rehabilitation, tree planting, no to mining, no to plastics, regulated cutting of trees. |
| 22 | Ildebrando Dañas Salud | 2019‑present | Installation of solar street lights; Development of the new government center including the completion of the 3-storey Municipal Hall in Brgy. Buhaynasapa |

=== Official seal ===
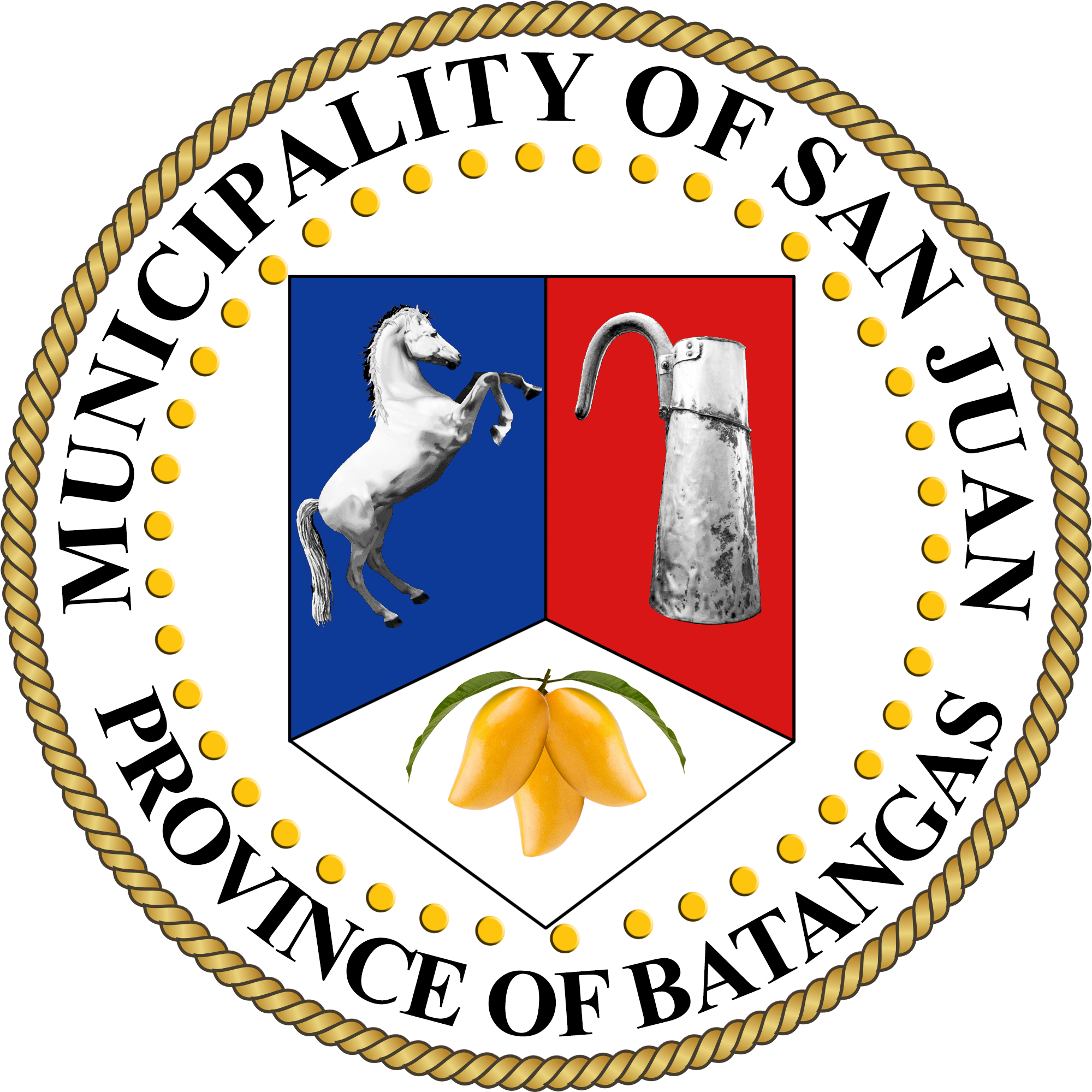

- Horse – The municipality is known for its horses and other farm animals like cows, pigs, and goats.
- Tuba Container – locally known as batang, a container in which tuba is gathered from the coconut tree.
- Fruits – Fruits such as mangoes, citrus, atis and tamarind which are grown abundantly in the town.
- Roundels – signifies the number of barangays (42) comprising the municipality

== Tourism ==
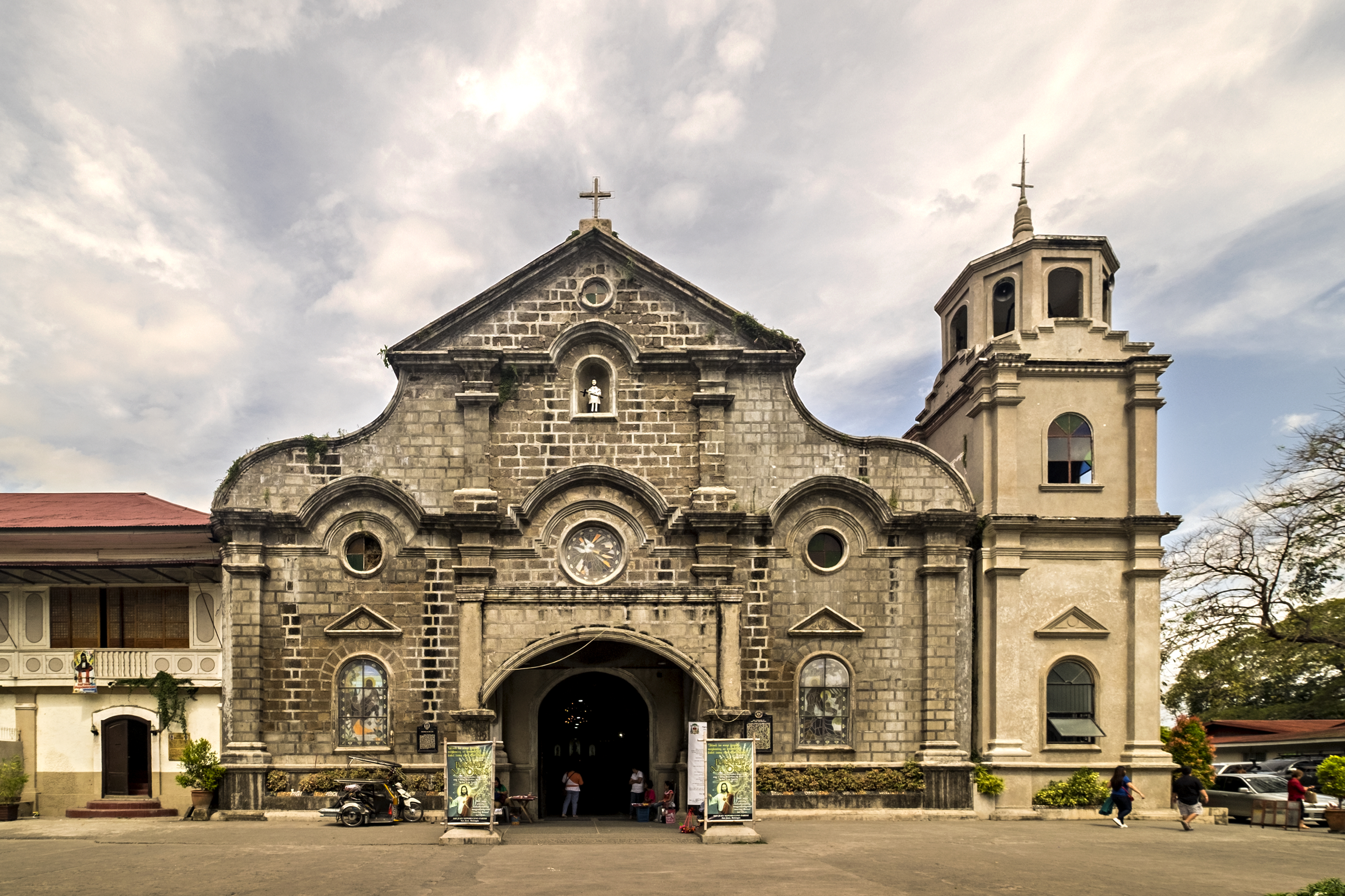
San Juan Nepomuceno Parish Church

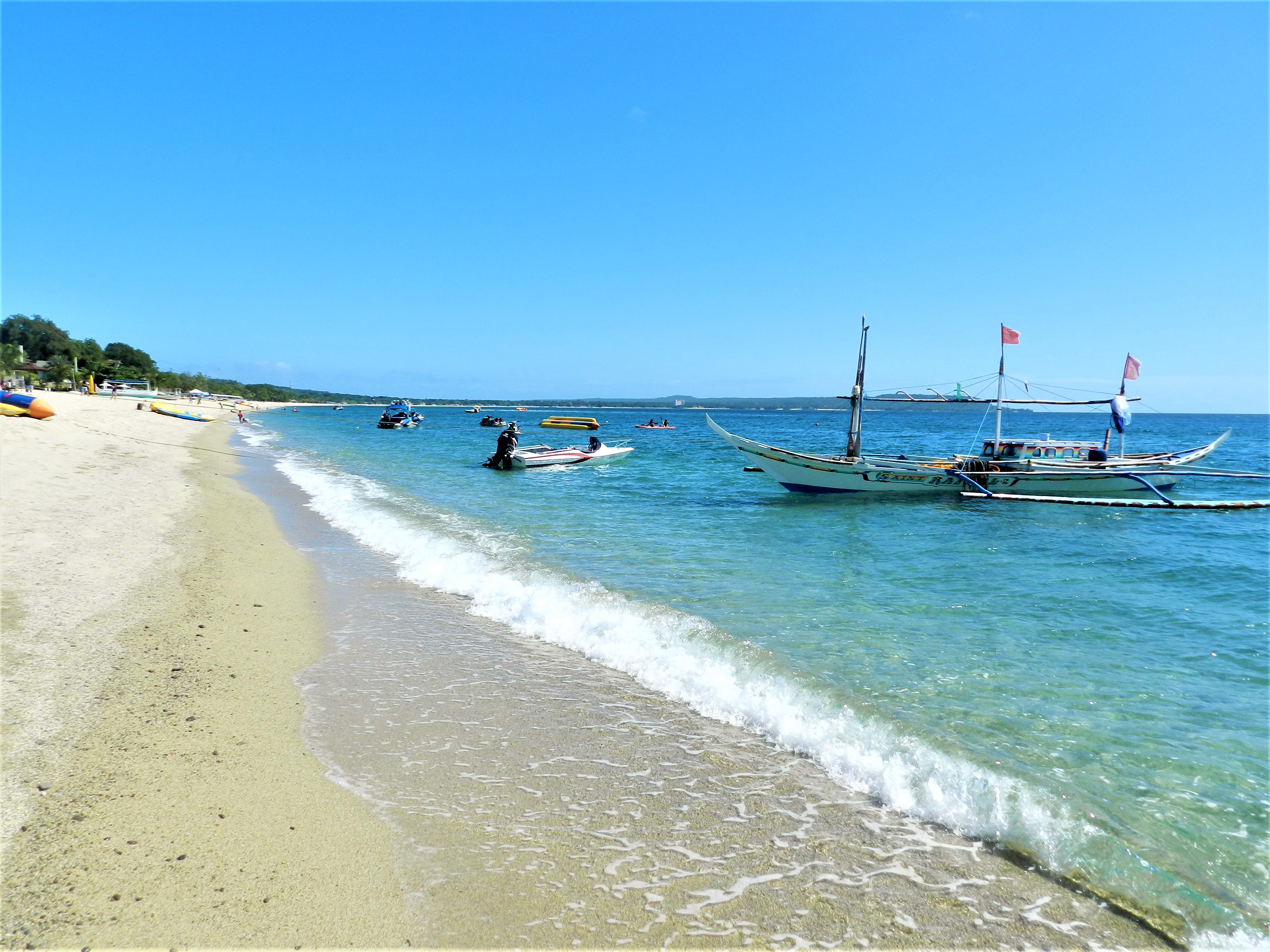
Laiya Beach

On June 29, 2010, then President Gloria Macapagal Arroyo signed the Executive Order No. 904, series of 2010 designating the Municipality of San Juan, Batangas as a priority area for Tourism Development.

Attractions include:

- San Juan Nepomuceno Parish Church – The church was built during the Spanish colonial period.
- Laiya Beach – San Juan has a coastline with several beach resorts for swimming, diving and other outdoor activities
- Mount Daguldol – The highest mountain in San Juan, 670 metres (2,200 ft) high
- Mangrove Forest at Barangay Poctol – One of the largest mangrove areas in San Juan; located in Sitio Pontor
- Ancestral houses – Built during Spanish and American colonial periods in the town.
- Old Municipal Hall – Erected in 1928 under the administration of Juan R. Quizon, the then Presidente Municipal. It has a simple yet enticing architectural style
- Malaking River at Barangay Poctol – This river serves as a boundary between Batangas and Quezon Province.
- Naambon Falls - A secluded, undisturbed series of falls and small pools. It has several look-out points with views of dense forest and Tayabas Bay.

== Education ==
There are two schools district offices which govern all educational institutions within the municipality. They oversee the management and operations of all private and public, from primary to secondary schools. These are the San Juan East Schools District Office, and San Juan West Schools District Office.

Private schools in town include Joseph Marello Institute, Batangas Eastern Colleges, CCFI Christian Academy, South Ridge Asian Integrated Montessori School, and San Juan Institute of Technology founded in 1947, 1940, 1991, 2011, and 2018 respectively. San Juan has also a campus of Batangas State University located at Barangay Talahiban II.

Almost all barangays have their own elementary and high schools, where tuition fees are relatively low or nonexistent.

Despite improvements in the town's education system, parents of some students from well-off families send their children to other cities, such as Lipa and Batangas, as well as to the National Capital Region (NCR), for college.

=== Primary and elementary schools ===
- Abung Elementary School
- Aplaya Elementary School
- Balagbag Elementary School
- Barualte Elementary School
- Bataan Elementary School
- Batangas Eastern Colleges (Elementary)
- Calabasahan Elementary School
- Calitcalit Elementary School
- CCFI Christian Academy
- Don Eulogio Luistro Elementary School
- Paaralang Elementarya ng Buhaynasapa
- Paaralang Elementarya ng Calubcub 1
- Paaralang Elementarya ng Escribano
- Paaralang Elementarya Ng Janaojanao
- Paaralang Elementarya ng Mabalanoy
- Paaralang Elementarya ng Marcal
- Paaralang Elementarya ng Muzon
- Paaralang Elementarya ng Palahanan
- Paaralang Elementarya ng Pal-Sico
- Paaralang Elementarya ng Pulangbato
- Paaralang Elementarya ng Putingbuhangin
- Paaralang Elementarya ng Quipot
- Paaralang Elementarya ng Sampiro
- Paaralang Elementarya ng Talahiban 1
- Paaralang Elementarya ng Tipas
- Calubcub II Elementary School
- Catmon Elementary School
- Coloconto Elementary School
- Grounds of Hope Christian Learning Schools
- Hugom Elementary School
- Imelda Elementary School
- Joseph Marello Institute (Elementary)
- Laiya Elementary School
- Libato Elementary School
- Libjo Sapangan Elementary School
- Paaralang Elementarya ng Nagsaula
- Palingowak Elementary School
- Pinagbayanan Elementary School
- Paaralang Elementarya ng Poctol
- Quipot Adventist Elementary School
- San Juan East Central School
- San Juan West Central School
- Sapangan Elementary School
- Subukin Elementary School
- Talahiban II Elementary School
- Ticalan Elementary School
- Wenceslao I Llana Memorial School

=== Secondary schools ===
- Angeles Luistro Integrated Senior High School
- Aplaya National High School
- Batangas Eastern Colleges (Secondary)
- Buhay na Sapa National High School
- Calubcob I National High School
- Calubcub I Senior High School
- Don Leon Mercado Sr. Memorial National High School
- Joseph Marello Institute (Secondary)
- Laiya Aplaya Christian Academy
- Laiya National High School
- Libato National High School
- Lipahan National High School
- Lumangbayan National High School
- Nagsaulay National High School
- Pacita Ramos Mendoza Memorial National High School
- Palahanan National High School
- Pulangbato National High School
- Sampiro Integrated Senior High School
- San Juan Institute of Technology
- San Juan Senior High School
- Sico 1 National High School
- South Ridge Asian Integrated Montessori School
- Tipas National High School

=== Higher educational institutions ===
- Batangas Eastern Colleges
- Batangas State University

== Notable personalities ==
- Renato de Villa – Former chief of staff, Armed Forces of the Philippines; former secretary, Department of National Defense; 1998 presidential election candidate
- Rudy Salud – Founding secretary general, World Boxing Council; Former PBA commissioner; boxing manager and promoter
- Leandro Mendoza – Former executive secretary under President Gloria Macapagal Arroyo; former police director General, Philippine National Police (2001)
- Salvador Q. Quizon – Auxiliary bishop-emeritus, Archdiocese of Lipa
- Alyssa Valdez – Volleyball player
- Ace Medrano – Broadcast journalist, news anchor
