= John of Nepomuk =

Czech priest and saint (c. 1345–1393)

Saint John of Nepomuk
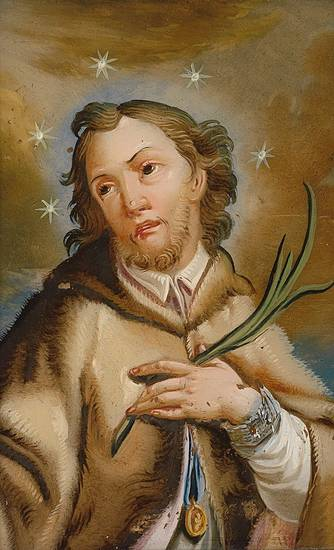

Martyr
- Born: c. 1345; Nepomuk, Bohemia
- Died: 20 March 1393 (aged 47–48); Prague, Bohemia
- Venerated in: Catholic Church
- Beatified: 31 May 1721, Rome by Pope Innocent XIII
- Canonized: 19 March 1729, Rome by Pope Benedict XIII
- Feast: 20 March; 16 May
- Attributes: Halo with five stars, cross, bridge, angel indicating silence by a finger over the lips, priest's biretta
- Patronage: confessors, mariners, raftsmen, millers, sievers, bridges, against hazards by water, for discretion; Bohemia, San Juan, Batangas, Malibay, Pasay; Alfonso, Cavite; Moalboal, Cebu; San Remigio, Cebu; Cabiao, Spanish Navy Marines, Prague, Slavonski Brod, Omiš

John of Nepomuk, also called John Nepomucene (Czech: Jan Nepomucký; German: Johannes Nepomuk; Latin: Ioannes Nepomucenus; c. 1345 – 20 March 1393), was a Bohemian clergyman. Due to his loyalty to Archbishop Jan of Jenštejn in a dispute with the Bohemian crown, he was executed by King Wenceslaus IV of Bohemia by being thrown into the Vltava.

In the decades following his death, a cult grew around John's life and death based on fabulous hagiographies and alleged miraculous healings. He was canonized in 1729, and is considered a martyr of the Seal of the Confessional. He is also a patron against calumnies and a protector from floods and drowning.

== Biography ==
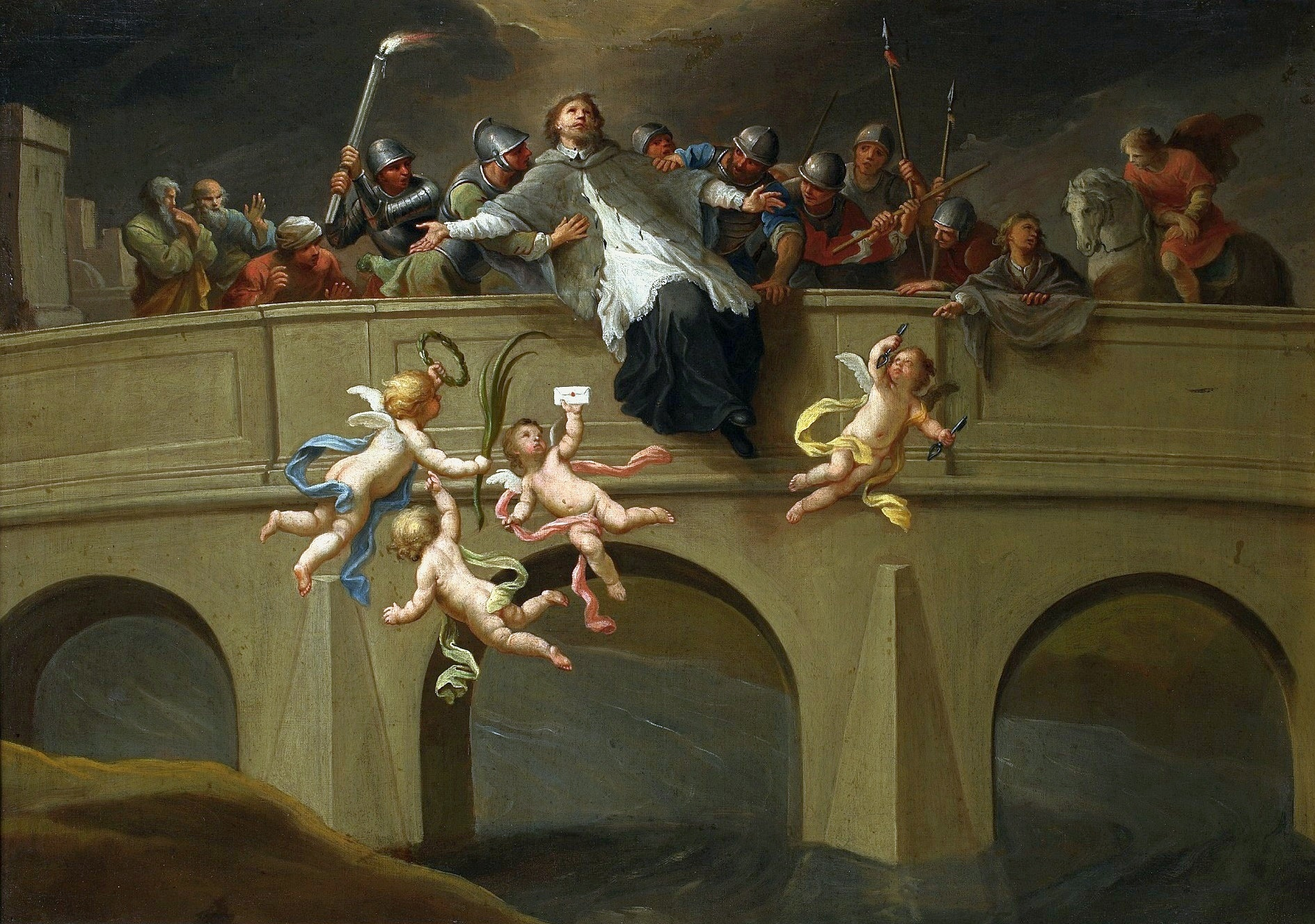
Martyrdom of St. John Nepomuk by Szymon Czechowicz, National Museum in Warsaw

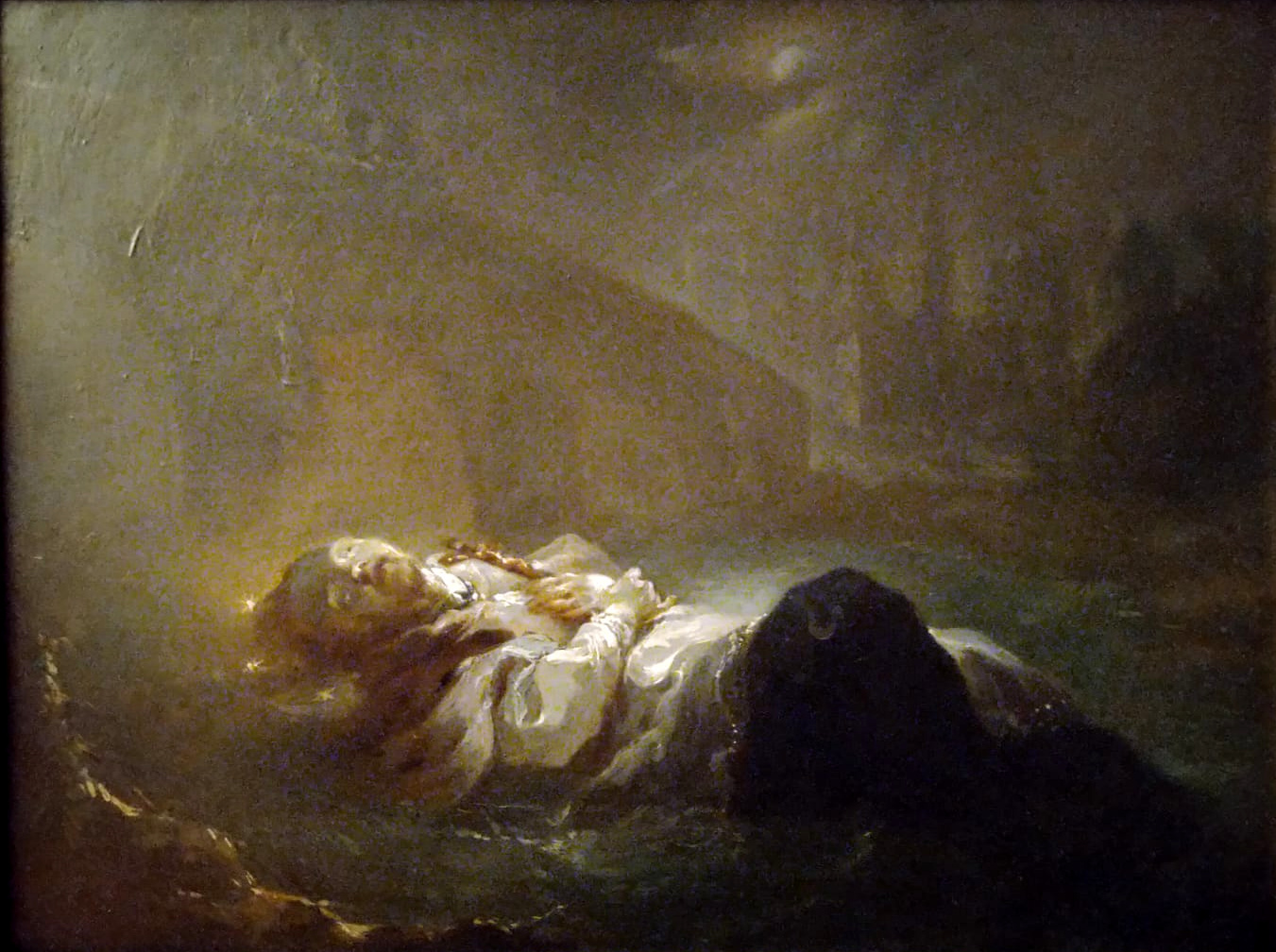
The Dead Body of John of Nepomuk on the banks of the Vltava, c. 1760, by Franz Xaver Palko

John of Nepomuk was born between 1340–50 in Bohemia. His birthplace was the village Pomuk, now Nepomuk in the Czech Republic. John's father was Velflín, a diminutive form of Wolfgang.

John attended the University of Prague. In 1378, he was appointed notary to the archbishop. He studied canon law at the University of Padua from 1383 to 1387. In 1393, he was made vicar-general of Saint Giles Cathedral by Jan of Jenštejn, Archbishop of Prague.

Jenštejn was under the supervision of Pope Boniface IX in Rome. King Wenceslaus IV supported the Avignon papacy and Antipope Clement VII. In 1393, Wenceslaus wanted to absorb the revenue of the Benedictine abbey in Kladruby. Jenštejn opposed the plan. The outraged King summoned Jenštejn and his subordinates, where they were arrested. Jenštejn escaped, but John and three others were captured and tortured. John was the only one who remained loyal to Archbishop Jenštejn.

On March 20, Wenceslaus had John thrown from the Charles Bridge into the Vltava, a standard method of execution for criminal clergy. It has been suggested that the King's tortures actually killed John and the disposal of his corpse in the river was an attempt to disguise the cause of his death. John's body was discovered three days later and taken to a nearby church. When Wenceslaus left for his country estate, John was interred in St. Vitus Cathedral, a direct affront to the King.

Just over a month later, Archbishop Jenštejn presented Pope Boniface IX with evidence of Wenceslaus' crimes. Jenštejn described John of Nepomuk as a "a glorious martyr of Christ and sparkling with miracles". When King Wenceslaus was summoned to the Imperial Diet in Nuremberg in 1400, murder of John of Nepomuk was one of the charges against him.

== Legend ==
John of Nepomuk's life and death were relatively well documented by chroniclers such as Abbott Ladolf of Sagan. John of Posilge's chronicle of the Teutonic Order also includes John's story.

The legend grew that King Wenceslaus IV executed John because he had heard the Queen's confession and would not reveal any of her secrets. The story first appeared in Thomas Ebendorfer's Chronica regum Romanorum (Chronicle of the Roman Kings, 1459). Pavel Žídek's Jiří(ho) správovna (Advice for the King, 1471) embroidered the tale: The jealous King feared his wife was unfaithful and ordered "Magister Johannes" to reveal the name of her lover. When John refused, the King ordered him drowned. The river dried up after the execution.

Another embellishment on the story held that a heavenly glow descended on John's body in the river. The spectacle drew the attention of the populace. The Queen burst in on Wenceslaus to ask what was causing the light on the river, and the King was so ashamed that he fled to his country estate.

In 1483 John of Krumlov, dean of St. Vitus cathedral, placed John's death in 1383. The mistake was possibly due to a transcription error. Krumlov's date created confusion as to which of King Wenceslaus' two wives confessed to Nepomuk. Krumlov's error was parroted in Wenceslaus Hajek's Annales Bohemorum (1541). Hajek proposes that there were two Johns of Nepomuk. The first was killed in 1383 after keeping the queen's confession sealed. The second was killed in 1393 over the dispute about the abbot of Kladruby. Hajek influenced historians for two centuries.

John's legend grew more florid in the 17th and 18th centuries. Boleslaus Balbinus's Vita Beati Joannis Nepomuceni Martyris (1670) was a particularly influential version of the tale. A 19th-century author described Balbinus's embellishments on John's hagiography as "one of the most tremendous blunders ever perpetrated by an infallible authority".

John of Nepomuk's original entry in Roman Martyrology was for May 16 and read, "At Prague, in Bohemia, St. John Nepomucen, a canon of the metropolitan church, who, being tempted in vain to betray the secret of confession, was cast into the river Moldau, and thus won the palm of martyrdom." In the current version, the saint's entry for March 20 reads, "At Prague in Bohemia, Saint John of Nepomuk, priest and martyr, who in defending the Church received many punishments from King Wenceslas the Fourth and, exposed to torture and torment, was finally thrown into the Moldavian River while still breathing."

== Canonization ==
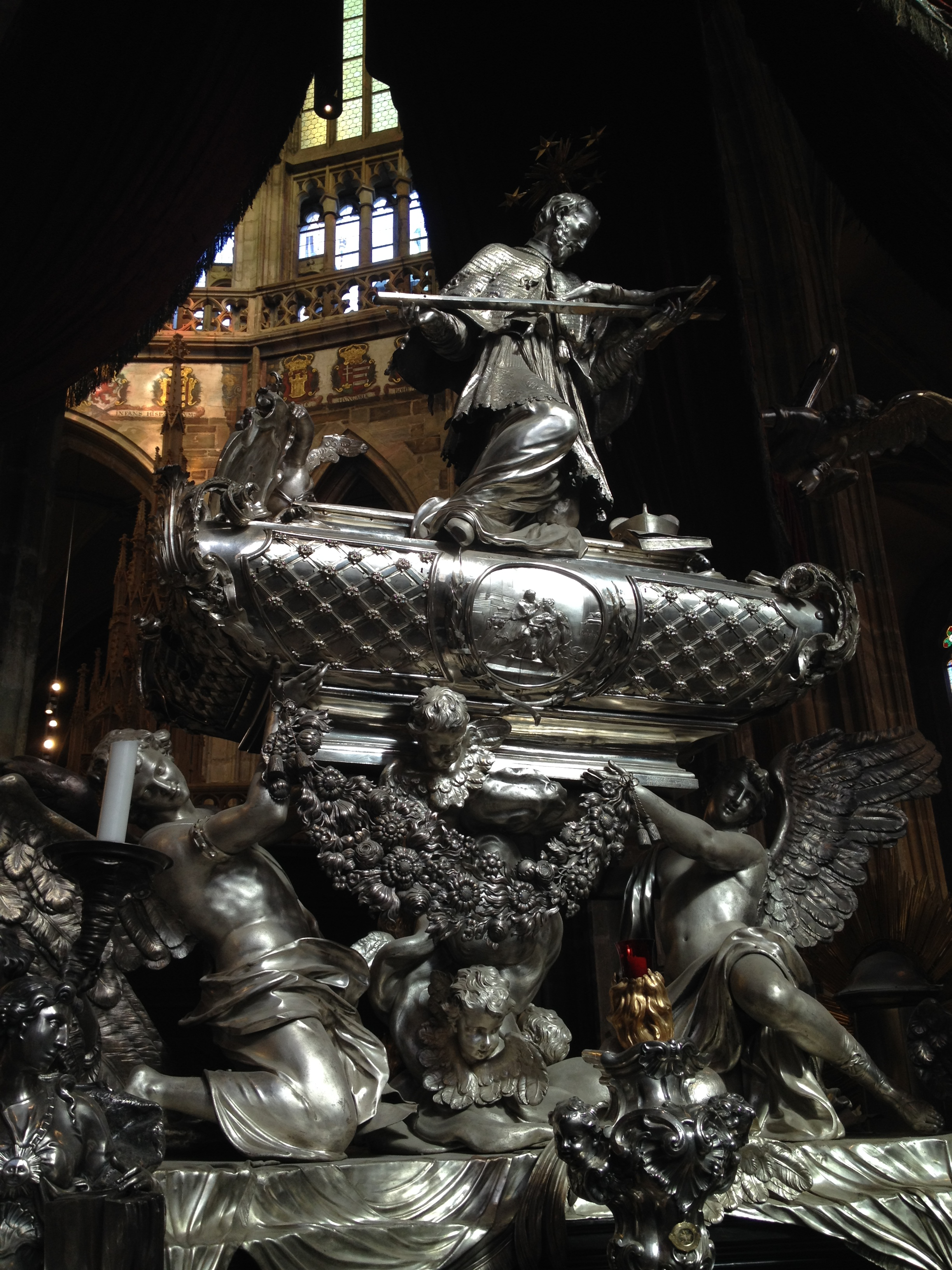
St. John of Nepomuk's Tomb in St Vitus Cathedral, Prague

John of Nepomuk's original tomb was marked by a small stone near the altar in St. Vitus' Cathedral. It quickly became an object of veneration. Christians from several sects believed not paying Nepomuk's grave proper respect could lead to calamities like paralysis or even death. When Fynes Moryson visited Prague in 1590, he found this practice still widespread. Several such incidents were actually cited as evidence during Nepomuk's canonization.

To prevent it from being stepped on, a grille was placed around the gravestone in 1421. The grille made the tomb more prominent, attracting more veneration. In 1530, a second grille was placed around the first. The Winter King Frederick V had the railings torn down in 1619. A proper tomb was erected in 1694. A third version of the tomb was designed by Joseph Emanuel Fischer von Erlach and created by Antonio Corradini in 1736. It remains in the cathedral today.

On 31 May 1721, John of Nepomuk was beatified. He was canonized on 19 March 1729 under Pope Benedict XIII. The acts of the process, comprising 500 pages, distinguish two Johns of Nepomuk and sanction the cult of the one who was drowned in 1383 as a martyr of the sacrament of penance.

The theological tensions that led to Nepomuk's death also marked his legacy. One historiography holds that the Habsburgs proffered Nepomuk as a national saint in order to reduce the veneration of Jan Hus. Even during the saint's 1721 beatification festival, the motif of a swan (Nepomuk) defeating a goose (Hus) was widespread. Nepomuk's original feast day on May 16th was also designed to heighten his national symbolism, as it coincided with traditional spring celebrations.

== Veneration ==
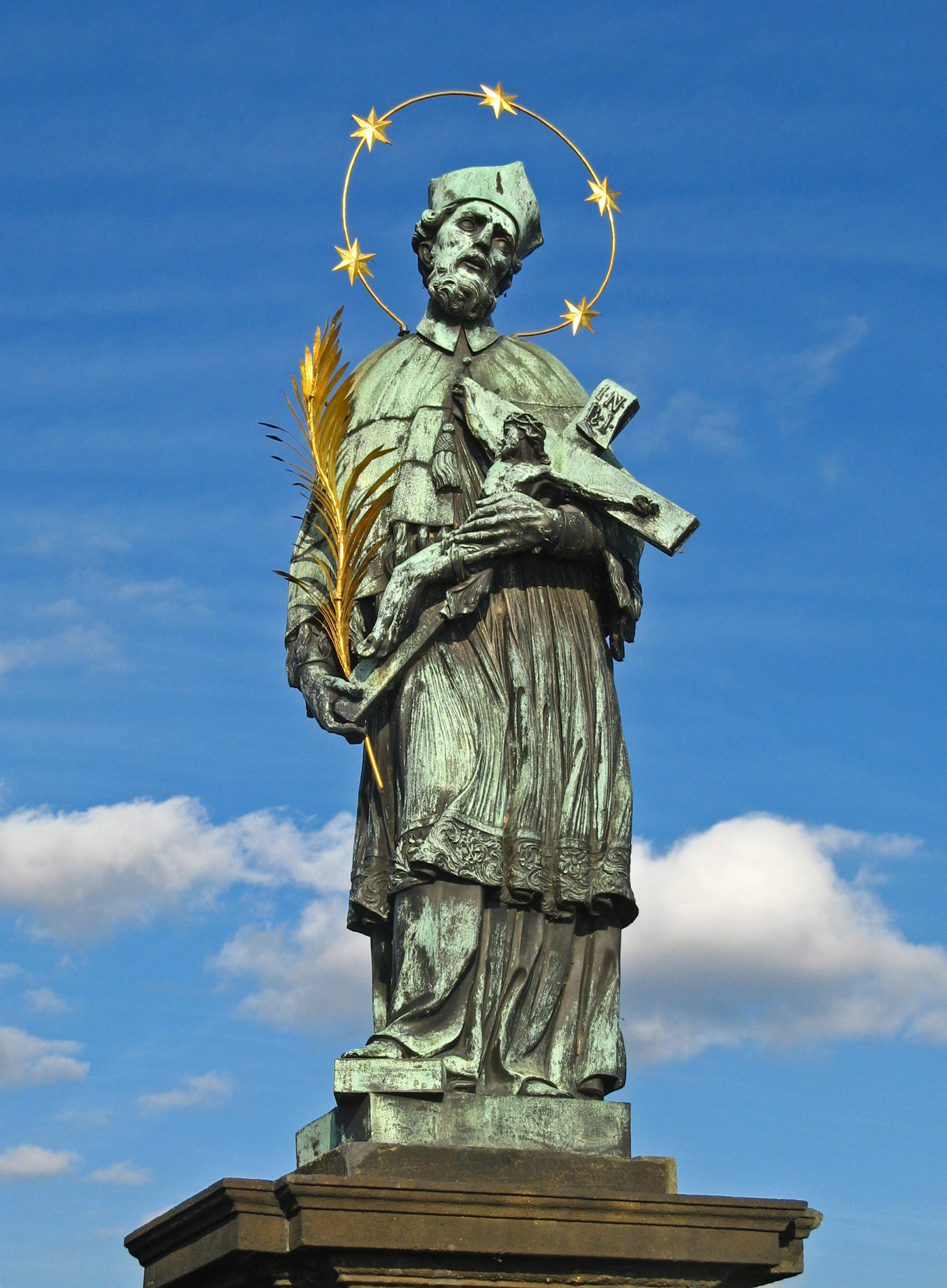
The prototypical statue of John of Nepomuk at Charles Bridge in Prague, at the site where the saint was thrown into Vltava. Made by Jan Brokoff upon a model by Matthias Rauchmiller in 1683, on the supposed 300th anniversary of the saint's death, which was until the mid-18th century presumed to have happened in 1383. It was the basis for a number of statues of the saint all across Europe.

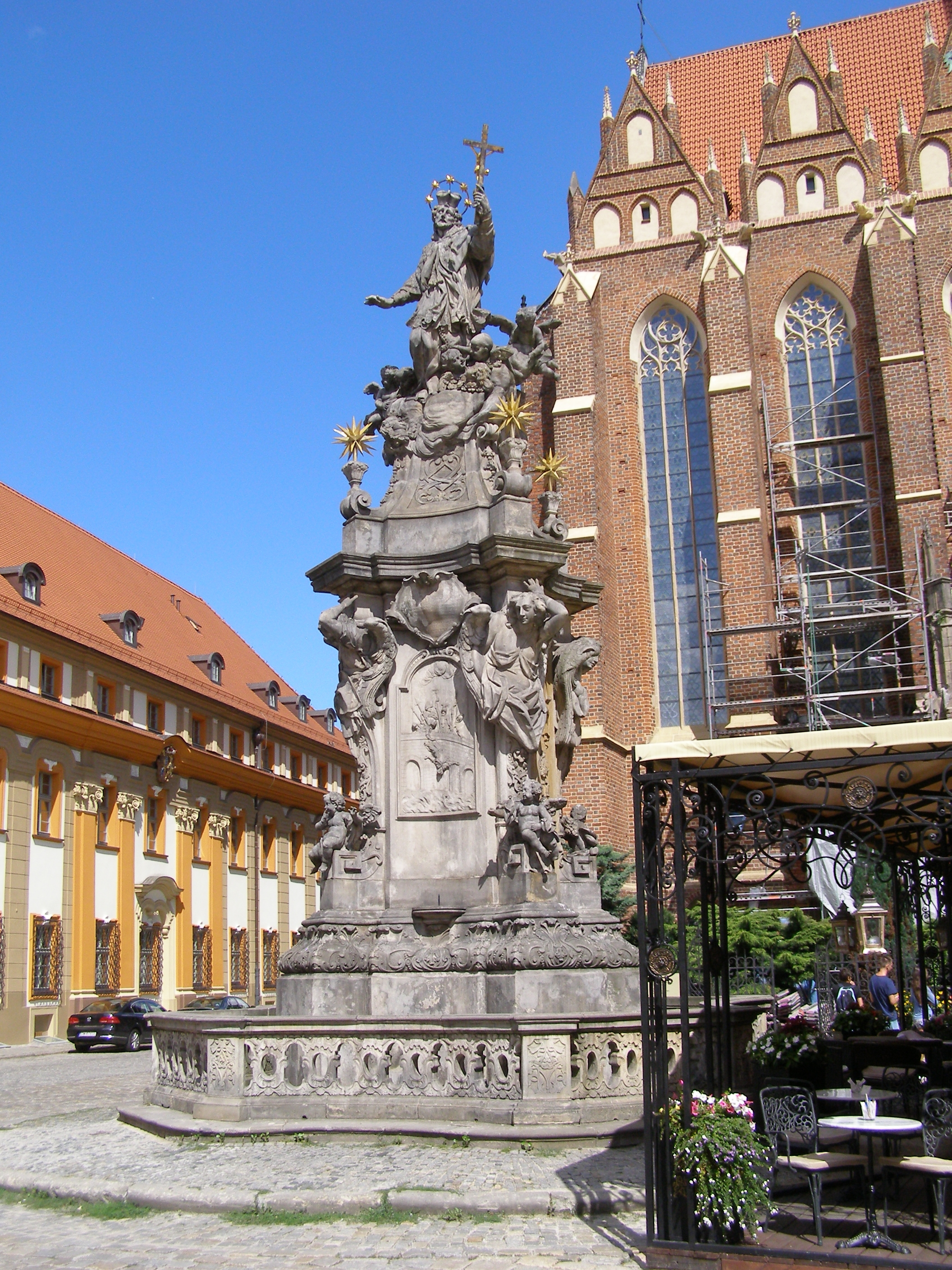
1732 monument on Cathedral Island in Wrocław, by Jan Jiři Urbansky

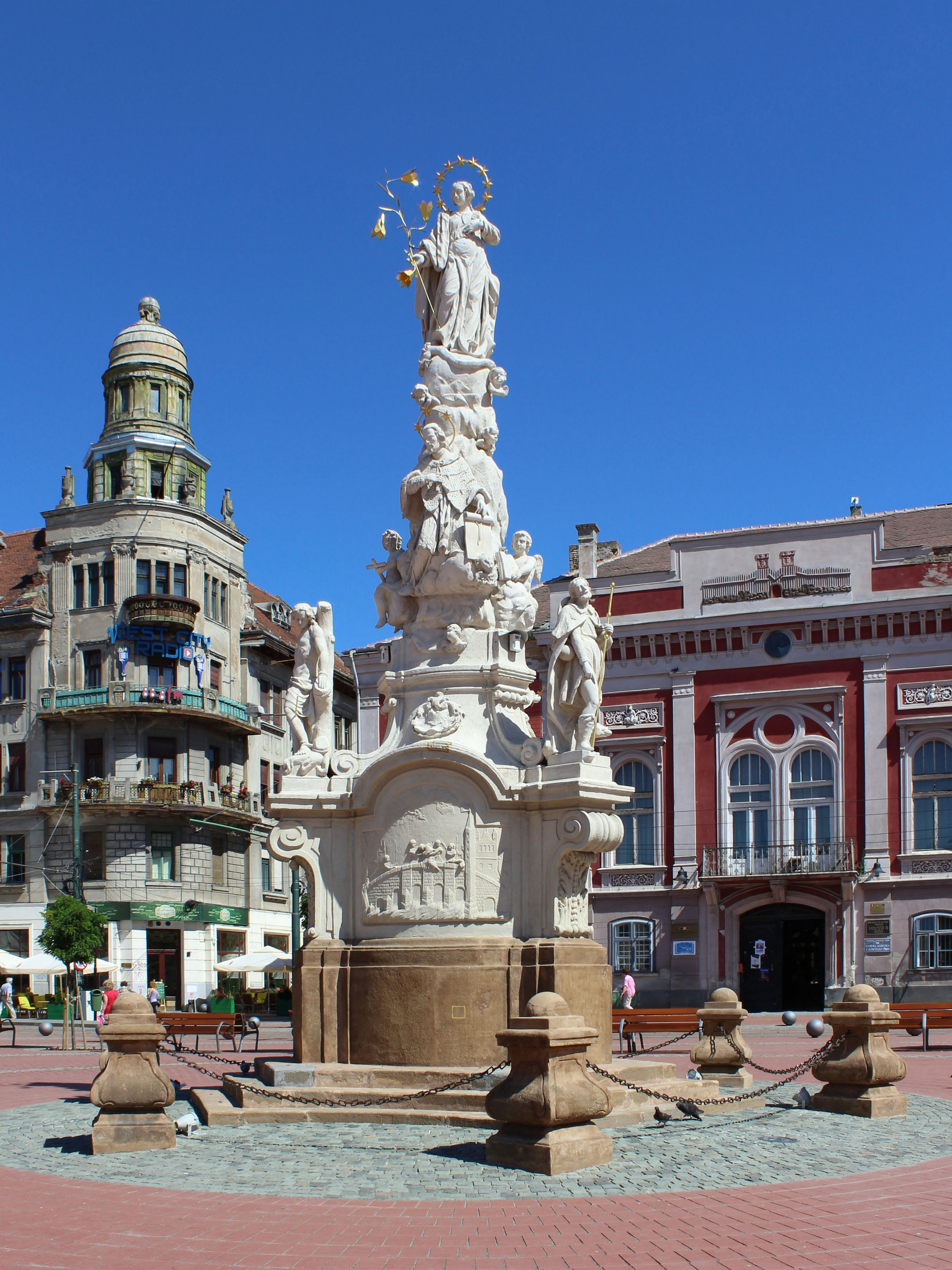
1756 Baroque monument in Timișoara's Liberty Square

The cult of St. John of Nepomuk spread during 17th and 18th centuries from Bohemia into many Catholic countries, especially those with ties to the Habsburg family. In 1643, a chapel in John of Nepomuk's birthplace was built in his honor. In 1683 the Charles Bridge was adorned with a statue of the saint, which has had numerous successors. The Pilgrimage Church of Saint John of Nepomuk was founded in 1719.

Belief in John's supernatural powers heightened in 1719 when his tomb was opened and his tongue was found shriveled but intact. The tongue was most likely a remnant of brain tissue. The Jesuits adopted him as one of their patrons in 1732. Nepomuk has been described as the quintessential Baroque saint.

Worldwide, statues of John of Nepomuk number in tens of thousands, making John of Nepomuk the most represented Czech person in visual art. In Czechia alone, there are around 6000 statues. Similar numbers are in Austria and Germany, and smaller numbers in other parts of the former Habsburg Empire. Individual statues or other monuments can be found in almost every country with a significant Catholic tradition.

Most of those statues are located on bridges (due to John of Nepomuk being a patron saint of bridges and against drowning) and are modelled according to the famous John of Nepomuk statue on the Charles Bridge in Prague. He is usually portrayed with a halo with five stars, alluding to the legend about stars that hovered over his dead body when it was found on the bank of the Vltava river.

His name is a common baptismal name in Czech lands. His name is shared with another saint, the American bishop and Catholic educationalist John Nepomucene Neumann, who was born in Bohemia to a German father and Czech mother. Charles Warren Stoddard suggested John of Nepomuk be adopted as the patron saint of the Bohemian Club in 1882. A statue was installed a few months later, and a replica stands opposite the Owl Shrine at Bohemian Grove.

Many musical works were written in honor of John of Nepomuk. Antonio Caldara composed an oratorio titled after him in 1726. Johann Poppe composed a Te Deum for his canonization in 1726. Caldara also composed a Mass for Nepomuk, and the saint was the subject of dozens of works by composers like Jan Ignác František Vojta and Šimon Brixi.

== See also ==
- List of Catholic saints
- Pilgrimage Church of Saint John of Nepomuk
- Statue of John of Nepomuk, Vyšehrad
- Chapel of St. John of Nepomuk, Zawiercie
- San Juan Nepomuceno (disambiguation)
- Nepomuceno (surname)
- Jan Nepomucen
- Johann Nepomuk Hiedler, who is sometimes believed to be named after John of Nepomuk.
