= 2022 Philippine local elections in Calabarzon =

- May 9, 2022
- Gubernatorial elections
- 5 provincial governors and 1 city mayor
Party	Seats	+/–
PDP–Laban	3	0
NPC	2	+1
NUP	1	New
This lists parties that won seats. See the complete results below.
- Vice gubernatorial elections
- 5 provincial vice governors and 1 city vice mayor
Party	Seats	+/–
PDP–Laban	3	0
NPC	1	0
NUP	1	New
PFP	1	0
This lists parties that won seats. See the complete results below.
- Provincial Board elections
- 58 provincial board members and 10 city councilors
Party	Seats	+/–
NPC	18	+9
NUP	14	+9
Nacionalista	13	−13
PDP–Laban	11	−3
Aksyon	4	+4
Lakas	4	+3
Liberal	1	−5
PROMDI	1	New
UNA	1	−1
Independent	1	−1
This lists parties that won seats. See the complete results below.

The 2022 Philippine local elections in Calabarzon were held on May 9, 2022.

== Summary ==
=== Governors ===
Province/city	Incumbent	Incumbent's party	Winner	Winner's party	Winning margin
Batangas	Hermilando Mandanas	PDP–Laban	Hermilando Mandanas	PDP–Laban	38.10%
Cavite	Jonvic Remulla	NUP	Jonvic Remulla	NUP	77.08%
Laguna	Ramil Hernandez	PDP–Laban	Ramil Hernandez	PDP–Laban	16.17%
Lucena (HUC)	Mark Alcala	PDP–Laban	Mark Alcala	PDP–Laban	46.11%
Quezon	Danilo Suarez	Lakas	Angelina Tan	NPC	40.98%
Rizal	Rebecca Ynares	NPC	Nina Ynares	NPC	76.92%

=== Vice governors ===
Province/city	Incumbent	Incumbent's party	Winner	Winner's party	Winning margin
Batangas	Mark Leviste	PDP–Laban	Mark Leviste	PDP–Laban	53.92%
Cavite	Jolo Revilla	Lakas	Athena Tolentino	NUP	70.74%
Laguna	Katherine Agapay	PDP–Laban	Katherine Agapay	PDP–Laban	22.50%
Lucena (HUC)	Vacant		Dondon Alcala	PDP–Laban	50.06%
Quezon	Sam Nantes	Aksyon	Third Alcala	NPC	36.30%
Rizal	Junrey San Juan	PFP	Junrey San Juan	PFP	33.70%

=== Provincial boards ===
Province/city	Seats	Party control		Composition
Province/city	Seats	Previous	Result	Composition
Batangas	12 elected 3 ex-officio	Nacionalista	Nacionalista	Nacionalista (10); NPC (1); Aksyon (1)
Cavite	16 elected 3 ex-officio	No majority	NUP	NUP (11); Lakas (3); NPC (1); UNA (1)
Laguna	10 elected 3 ex-officio	No majority	No majority	PDP–Laban (4); Aksyon (3); Nacionalista (1); Lakas (1); NUP (1)
Lucena (HUC)	10 elected 2 ex-officio	No majority	No majority	PDP–Laban (6); NPC (1); PROMDI (1); Liberal (1); Independent (1)
Quezon	10 elected 3 ex-officio	No majority	NPC	NPC (7); Nacionalista (2); NUP (1)
Rizal	10 elected 4 ex-officio	No majority	NPC	NPC (8); PDP–Laban (1); NUP (1)

== Batangas ==
=== Governor ===
Incumbent Governor Hermilando Mandanas of PDP–Laban ran for a third term.

Mandanas won re-election against former Padre Garcia mayor Prudencio Gutierrez (Nationalist People's Coalition) and Praxedes Bustamante (Independent). Former Batangas vice governor Ricky Recto (Independent) was initially a candidate, but he withdrew on April 22, 2022.

Candidate	Party	Votes	%
Hermilando Mandanas (incumbent)	PDP–Laban	928,322	65.93
Prudencio Gutierrez	Nationalist People's Coalition	391,868	27.83
Ricky Recto (withdrew)	Independent	72,430	5.14
Praxedes Bustamante	Independent	15,414	1.09
Total		1,408,034	100.00
Total votes		1,587,376	–
Registered voters/turnout		1,819,071	87.26
PDP–Laban hold			
Source: Commission on Elections

=== Vice Governor ===
Incumbent Vice Governor Mark Leviste of PDP–Laban ran for a second term.

Leviste won re-election against former Department of Social Welfare and Development undersecretary Anton Hernandez (Partido Pilipino sa Pagbabago).

Candidate	Party	Votes	%
Mark Leviste (incumbent)	PDP–Laban	1,010,937	76.96
Anton Hernandez	Partido Pilipino sa Pagbabago	302,673	23.04
Total		1,313,610	100.00
Total votes		1,587,376	–
Registered voters/turnout		1,819,071	87.26
PDP–Laban hold			
Source: Commission on Elections

=== Provincial Board ===
The Batangas Provincial Board is composed of 15 board members, 12 of whom are elected.

The Nacionalista Party won 10 seats, maintaining its majority in the provincial board.

Party	Votes	%	Seats	+/–
Nacionalista Party	1,283,573	66.10	10	–2
Nationalist People's Coalition	447,665	23.05	1	+1
Aksyon Demokratiko	90,738	4.67	1	New
Independent	119,882	6.17	0	0
Total	1,941,858	100.00	12	0
Total votes	1,587,376	–		
Registered voters/turnout	1,819,071	87.26		

==== 1st district ====
Batangas' 1st provincial district consists of the same area as Batangas's 1st legislative district. Two board members are elected from this provincial district.

Four candidates were included in the ballot.

Candidate	Party	Votes	%
Junjun Rosales (incumbent)	Nacionalista Party	158,819	36.55
Armie Bausas	Nacionalista Party	117,441	27.02
Carlos Ermita Alvarez	Nationalist People's Coalition	96,048	22.10
Jude Suayan	Independent	62,269	14.33
Total		434,577	100.00
Total votes		341,906	–
Registered voters/turnout		393,786	86.83
Source: Commission on Elections

==== 2nd district ====
Batangas's 2nd provincial district consists of the same area as Batangas's 2nd legislative district. Two board members are elected from this provincial district.

Four candidates were included in the ballot.

Candidate	Party	Votes	%
Arlene Magboo (incumbent)	Aksyon Demokratiko	90,738	40.24
Wilson Rivera (incumbent)	Nacionalista Party	83,412	36.99
Ramon Lagrana	Nationalist People's Coalition	45,298	20.09
Genaro Abreu	Independent	6,059	2.69
Total		225,507	100.00
Total votes		171,021	–
Registered voters/turnout		196,497	87.03
Source: Commission on Elections

==== 3rd district ====
Batangas's 3rd provincial district consists of the same area as Batangas's 3rd legislative district. Two board members are elected from this provincial district.

Three candidates were included in the ballot.

Candidate	Party	Votes	%
Fred Corona	Nationalist People's Coalition	178,797	38.15
Rudy Balba (incumbent)	Nacionalista Party	162,346	34.64
Randy James Amo	Nationalist People's Coalition	127,522	27.21
Total		468,665	100.00
Total votes		421,081	–
Registered voters/turnout		478,027	88.09
Source: Commission on Elections

==== 4th district ====
Batangas's 4th provincial district consists of the same area as Batangas's 4th legislative district. Two board members are elected from this provincial district.

Two candidates were included in the ballot.

Candidate	Party	Votes	%
JP Gozos (incumbent)	Nacionalista Party	154,939	56.06
Jess de Veyra (incumbent)	Nacionalista Party	121,423	43.94
Total		276,362	100.00
Total votes		271,803	–
Registered voters/turnout		307,973	88.26
Source: Commission on Elections

==== 5th district ====
Batangas's 5th provincial district consists of the same area as Batangas's 5th legislative district. Two board members are elected from this provincial district.

Two candidates were included in the ballot.

Candidate	Party	Votes	%
Claudette Ambida (incumbent)	Nacionalista Party	128,641	50.48
Arthur Bart Blanco (incumbent)	Nacionalista Party	126,185	49.52
Total		254,826	100.00
Total votes		186,853	–
Registered voters/turnout		220,199	84.86
Source: Commission on Elections

==== 6th district ====
Batangas's 6th provincial district consists of the same area as Batangas's 6th legislative district. Two board members are elected from this provincial district.

Three candidates were included in the ballot.

Candidate	Party	Votes	%
Lydio Lopez Jr. (incumbent)	Nacionalista Party	126,049	44.71
Bibong Mendoza (incumbent)	Nacionalista Party	104,318	37.00
Rodel Lacorte	Independent	51,554	18.29
Total		281,921	100.00
Total votes		194,712	–
Registered voters/turnout		222,589	87.48
Source: Commission on Elections

== Cavite ==
=== Governor ===
Incumbent Governor Jonvic Remulla of the National Unity Party ran for a second term. He was previously affiliated with the Nacionalista Party.

Remulla won re-election against three other candidates.

Candidate	Party	Votes	%
Jonvic Remulla (incumbent)	National Unity Party	1,368,810	84.67
Weng Aguinaldo	Independent	122,699	7.59
Augusto Pera Jr.	Independent	98,893	6.12
Jerum Gilles	Independent	26,236	1.62
Total		1,616,638	100.00
Total votes		1,871,919	–
Registered voters/turnout		2,302,353	81.30
NUP hold			
Source: Commission on Elections

=== Vice Governor ===
Term-limited incumbent Vice Governor Jolo Revilla of Lakas–CMD ran for the House of Representatives in Cavite's 1st legislative district. He was previously affiliated with the Nationalist People's Coalition.

Tagaytay councilor Athena Tolentino (National Unity Party) won the election against Joseph Thim Jamboy (Independent).

Candidate	Party	Votes	%
Athena Tolentino	National Unity Party	1,196,761	85.37
Joseph Thim Jamboy	Independent	205,156	14.63
Total		1,401,917	100.00
Total votes		1,871,919	–
Registered voters/turnout		2,302,353	81.30
NUP gain from Lakas			
Source: Commission on Elections

=== Provincial Board ===
The Cavite Provincial Board is composed of 19 board members, 16 of whom are elected.

The National Unity Party won 11 seats, gaining a majority in the provincial board.

Party	Votes	%	Seats	+/–
National Unity Party	1,383,413	59.14	11	+7
Lakas–CMD	471,711	20.17	3	New
Nationalist People's Coalition	114,178	4.88	1	0
United Nationalist Alliance	68,191	2.92	1	+1
Liberal Party	57,932	2.48	0	–2
PROMDI	34,952	1.49	0	New
Pederalismo ng Dugong Dakilang Samahan	29,325	1.25	0	0
Independent	179,517	7.67	0	–1
Total	2,339,219	100.00	16	0
Total votes	1,871,919	–		
Registered voters/turnout	2,302,353	81.30		

==== 1st district ====
Cavite's 1st provincial district consists of the same area as Cavite's 1st legislative district. Two board members are elected from this provincial district.

Five candidates were included in the ballot.

Candidate	Party	Votes	%
Davey Chua (incumbent)	Lakas–CMD	120,138	43.14
Romel Enriquez (incumbent)	National Unity Party	65,105	23.38
Conrad Abutin	Liberal Party	57,932	20.80
Derlyn Maceda	Independent	27,765	9.97
William Narvaez	Nationalist People's Coalition	7,552	2.71
Total		278,492	100.00
Total votes		203,180	–
Registered voters/turnout		260,439	78.01
Source: Commission on Elections

==== 2nd district ====
Cavite's 2nd provincial district consists of the same area as Cavite's 2nd legislative district. Two board members are elected from this provincial district.

Two candidates were included in the ballot.

Candidate	Party	Votes	%
Ram Revilla	Lakas–CMD	143,097	52.99
Edwin Malvar (incumbent)	Lakas–CMD	126,923	47.01
Total		270,020	100.00
Total votes		233,429	–
Registered voters/turnout		294,496	79.26
Source: Commission on Elections

==== 3rd district ====
Cavite's 3rd provincial district consists of the same area as Cavite's 3rd legislative district. Two board members are elected from this provincial district.

Three candidates were included in the ballot.

Candidate	Party	Votes	%
Shernan Jaro	National Unity Party	113,172	46.92
Ony Cantimbuhan	National Unity Party	113,094	46.89
Lucius Minaldo	Independent	14,919	6.19
Total		241,185	100.00
Total votes		184,870	–
Registered voters/turnout		224,081	82.50
Source: Commission on Elections

==== 4th district ====
Cavite's 4th provincial district consists of the same area as Cavite's 4th legislative district. Two board members are elected from this provincial district.

Four candidates were included in the ballot.

Candidate	Party	Votes	%
Nickol Austria	National Unity Party	186,261	45.48
Jun dela Cuesta (incumbent)	National Unity Party	165,590	40.43
Delia Gajo	Independent	31,233	7.63
Joel Musa	Independent	26,496	6.47
Total		409,580	100.00
Total votes		336,817	–
Registered voters/turnout		400,074	84.19
Source: Commission on Elections

==== 5th district ====
Cavite's 5th provincial district consists of the same area as Cavite's 5th legislative district. Two board members are elected from this provincial district.

Six candidates were included in the ballot.

Candidate	Party	Votes	%
Aidel Belamide	Nationalist People's Coalition	106,626	28.97
Macoy Amutan	National Unity Party	95,972	26.07
Paolo Crisostomo	Lakas–CMD	81,553	22.16
Gerardo Anarna	PROMDI	34,952	9.50
Paolo Poblete	Pederalismo ng Dugong Dakilang Samahan	29,325	7.97
Dante Alumia	Independent	19,643	5.34
Total		368,071	100.00
Total votes		248,854	–
Registered voters/turnout		298,625	83.33
Source: Commission on Elections

==== 6th district ====
Cavite's 6th provincial district consists of the same area as Cavite's 6th legislative district. Two board members are elected from this provincial district.

Two candidates were included in the ballot.

Candidate	Party	Votes	%
Morit Sison	National Unity Party	87,456	50.15
Kerby Salazar (incumbent)	National Unity Party	86,924	49.85
Total		174,380	100.00
Total votes		141,035	–
Registered voters/turnout		193,284	72.97
Source: Commission on Elections

==== 7th district ====
Cavite's 7th provincial district consists of the same area as Cavite's 7th legislative district. Two board members are elected from this provincial district.

Four candidates were included in the ballot.

Candidate	Party	Votes	%
Crispin Diego Remulla (incumbent)	National Unity Party	154,515	43.94
Munding del Rosario	National Unity Party	137,706	39.16
John Mark Cayao	Independent	44,677	12.70
Jualinio Abutin	Independent	14,784	4.20
Total		351,682	100.00
Total votes		282,849	–
Registered voters/turnout		347,207	81.46
Source: Commission on Elections

==== 8th district ====
Cavite's 8th provincial district consists of the same area as Cavite's 8th legislative district. Two board members are elected from this provincial district.

Three candidates were included in the ballot.

Candidate	Party	Votes	%
Rainier Ambion (incumbent)	National Unity Party	114,362	46.52
Irene Bencito	United Nationalist Alliance	68,191	27.74
Riley Rillo	National Unity Party	63,256	25.73
Total		245,809	100.00
Total votes		240,885	–
Registered voters/turnout		284,147	84.77
Source: Commission on Elections

== Laguna ==
=== Governor ===
Incumbent Governor Ramil Hernandez of PDP–Laban ran for a third term.

Hernandez won re-election against representative Sol Aragones (Nacionalista Party) and Berlene Alberto (Independent).

Candidate	Party	Votes	%
Ramil Hernandez (incumbent)	PDP–Laban	887,095	57.69
Sol Aragones	Nacionalista Party	638,468	41.52
Berlene Alberto	Independent	12,169	0.79
Total		1,537,732	100.00
Total votes		1,656,745	–
Registered voters/turnout		2,045,687	80.99
PDP–Laban hold			
Source: Commission on Elections

=== Vice Governor ===
Incumbent Vice Governor Katherine Agapay of PDP–Laban ran for a third term.

Agapay won re-election against actor Jerico Ejercito (Partido Federal ng Pilipinas) and Agustin Parma (Independent).

Candidate	Party	Votes	%
Katherine Agapay (incumbent)	PDP–Laban	856,616	60.14
Jerico Ejercito	Partido Federal ng Pilipinas	536,200	37.64
Agustin Parma	Independent	31,670	2.22
Total		1,424,486	100.00
Total votes		1,656,745	–
Registered voters/turnout		2,045,687	80.99
PDP–Laban hold			
Source: Commission on Elections

=== Provincial Board ===
The Laguna Provincial Board is composed of 13 board members, 10 of whom are elected.

PDP–Laban won four seats, becoming the largest party in the provincial board.

Party	Votes	%	Seats	+/–
PDP–Laban	1,025,839	34.28	4	0
Aksyon Demokratiko	612,658	20.47	3	New
Nacionalista Party	569,096	19.02	1	–3
Lakas–CMD	200,302	6.69	1	New
National Unity Party	186,326	6.23	1	New
PROMDI	159,848	5.34	0	New
Bigkis Pinoy	106,047	3.54	0	0
Liberal Party	28,031	0.94	0	New
Kilusang Bagong Lipunan	17,980	0.60	0	New
Independent	86,568	2.89	0	0
Total	2,992,695	100.00	10	0
Total votes	1,656,745	–		
Registered voters/turnout	2,045,687	80.99		

==== 1st district ====
Laguna's 1st provincial district consists of the same area as Laguna's 1st legislative district and the cities of Biñan and Santa Rosa. Three board members are elected from this provincial district.

10 candidates were included in the ballot.

Candidate	Party	Votes	%
JM Carait (incumbent)	PDP–Laban	245,759	22.41
Danzel Fernandez	Aksyon Demokratiko	232,312	21.19
Bong Bejasa	PDP–Laban	170,290	15.53
Abigael Alonte	Nacionalista Party	155,811	14.21
Luisito Algabre	PROMDI	102,011	9.30
Sak Matibag	PDP–Laban	101,677	9.27
Reynamel Aguilar	Aksyon Demokratiko	35,624	3.25
Megi Borja	Liberal Party	28,031	2.56
Marvin Cuna	Independent	17,047	1.55
John Masaredo	PROMDI	7,858	0.72
Total		1,096,420	100.00
Total votes		504,793	–
Registered voters/turnout		620,036	81.41
Source: Commission on Elections

==== 2nd district ====
Laguna's 2nd provincial district consists of the same area as Laguna's 2nd legislative district and the city of Calamba. Three board members are elected from this provincial district.

Nine candidates were included in the ballot.

Candidate	Party	Votes	%
Christian Niño Lajara (incumbent)	Aksyon	208,863	18.80
Peewee Perez (incumbent)	PDP–Laban	183,937	16.56
Tutti Caringal	Nacionalista Party	168,671	15.18
Gigi Alcasid	Nacionalista Party	166,504	14.99
Ninoy Bagnes	PDP–Laban	163,467	14.71
Ting Alimagno	Bigkis Pinoy	106,047	9.55
Ann-ann Cardema	Nacionalista Party	51,385	4.63
Francis Fernandez	Independent	48,519	4.37
Art Celestial	Independent	13,534	1.22
Total		1,110,927	100.00
Total votes		527,350	–
Registered voters/turnout		684,020	77.10
Source: Commission on Elections

==== 3rd district ====
Laguna's 3rd provincial district consists of the same area as Laguna's 3rd legislative district. Two board members are elected from this provincial district.

Five candidates were included in the ballot.

Candidate	Party	Votes	%
Abi Yu (incumbent)	PDP–Laban	160,709	40.79
Karla Monica Adajar	Lakas–CMD	157,899	40.07
PJ Estrellado	PROMDI	49,979	12.68
Sheila Florentino	Kilusang Bagong Lipunan	17,980	4.56
Olivio Eustaquio	Independent	7,468	1.90
Total		394,035	100.00
Total votes		298,826	–
Registered voters/turnout		343,966	86.88
Source: Commission on Elections

==== 4th district ====
Laguna's 4th provincial district consists of the same area as Laguna's 4th legislative district. Two board members are elected from this provincial district.

Four candidates were included in the ballot.

Candidate	Party	Votes	%
Benjo Agarao	National Unity Party	186,326	47.62
Milo San Luis	Aksyon Demokratiko	135,859	34.72
Jake Yu	Lakas–CMD	42,403	10.84
RR Orillaza	Nacionalista Party	26,725	6.83
Total		391,313	100.00
Total votes		325,776	–
Registered voters/turnout		397,665	81.92
Source: Commission on Elections

== Lucena ==
=== Mayor ===
Term-limited incumbent Mayor Dondon Alcala of PDP–Laban ran for vice mayor of Lucena.

PDP–Laban nominated Alcala's son, Mark Alcala, who won against Quezon board member Mano Talaga (People's Reform Party), councilor Sunshine Abcede (Katipunan ng Nagkakaisang Pilipino) and four other candidates. Former vice mayor Philip Castillo (PROMDI) was initially a candidate in the election, but he died on February 19, 2022, and was substituted by his son, Deric Castillo.

Candidate	Party	Votes	%
Mark Alcala	PDP–Laban	104,216	66.23
Mano Talaga	People's Reform Party	31,659	20.12
Sunshine Abcede	Katipunan ng Nagkakaisang Pilipino	17,651	11.22
Deric Castillo	PROMDI	3,373	2.14
PM Rojo	Independent	219	0.14
Ed Zeta	Independent	139	0.09
Pedrito Maralit	Independent	107	0.07
Total		157,364	100.00
Total votes		162,173	–
Registered voters/turnout		183,412	88.42
PDP–Laban hold			
Source: Commission on Elections

=== Vice Mayor ===
Term-limited incumbent Vice Mayor Philip Castillo of PROMDI ran for mayor of Lucena, but died on February 19, 2022.

Lucena mayor Dondon Alcala (PDP–Laban) won the election against councilor Nilo Villapando (People's Reform Party) and Jhun Meera (Independent).

Candidate	Party	Votes	%
Dondon Alcala	PDP–Laban	113,654	74.68
Nilo Villapando	People's Reform Party	37,474	24.62
Jhun Meera	Independent	1,063	0.70
Total		152,191	100.00
Total votes		162,173	–
Registered voters/turnout		183,412	88.42
PDP–Laban gain from PROMDI			
Source: Commission on Elections

=== City Council ===
The Lucena City Council is composed of 12 councilors, 10 of whom are elected.

30 candidates were included in the ballot.

PDP–Laban won six seats, remaining as the largest party in the city council.

Party	Votes	%	Seats	+/–
PDP–Laban	551,934	46.53	6	0
Nationalist People's Coalition	305,994	25.80	1	New
PROMDI	77,242	6.51	1	New
Liberal Party	67,263	5.67	1	–1
Aksyon Demokratiko	21,950	1.85	0	New
Akbayan	14,578	1.23	0	New
Kilusang Bagong Lipunan	10,500	0.89	0	New
Independent	136,786	11.53	1	+1
Total	1,186,247	100.00	10	0
Total votes	162,173	–		
Registered voters/turnout	183,412	88.42		

Candidate	Party	Votes	%
Ayan Alcala	PDP–Laban	92,599	7.81
Danny Faller (incumbent)	PDP–Laban	88,069	7.42
Wilbert Noche (incumbent)	PDP–Laban	84,292	7.11
Patrick Nadera	PDP–Laban	81,920	6.91
Amer Lacerna (incumbent)	PDP–Laban	77,587	6.54
Baste Brizuela	PROMDI	77,242	6.51
Nick Pedro (incumbent)	Liberal Party	67,263	5.67
Edwin Pureza	Independent	61,280	5.17
Jose Christian Ona (incumbent)	PDP–Laban	61,194	5.16
Beth Sio	Nationalist People's Coalition	50,875	4.29
Boyet Alejandrino	Nationalist People's Coalition	50,054	4.22
Jha Jha Buñag	Independent	40,623	3.42
JB Calamigan	Nationalist People's Coalition	39,047	3.29
Totoy Traqueña	Nationalist People's Coalition	35,365	2.98
Vic Paulo	Nationalist People's Coalition	33,796	2.85
Gaddy Dimaculangan	Nationalist People's Coalition	33,191	2.80
Bernard Tagarao	Nationalist People's Coalition	32,714	2.76
Dan Zaballero	Nationalist People's Coalition	30,952	2.61
Star Castillo	PDP–Laban	28,751	2.42
Mike Dalida	Aksyon Demokratiko	21,950	1.85
Jun Buenaflor	PDP–Laban	20,015	1.69
Jopet Villafuerte	PDP–Laban	17,507	1.48
Ayie Baldonado	Independent	14,813	1.25
Peter Daleon	Akbayan	14,578	1.23
Teny Montecalbo	Kilusang Bagong Lipunan	10,500	0.89
Joseph Veluya	Independent	6,240	0.53
Butch Bibit	Independent	4,816	0.41
Edwin Aman	Independent	3,802	0.32
Itiman Oxina	Independent	2,621	0.22
Apiong Endiape	Independent	2,591	0.22
Total		1,186,247	100.00
Total votes		162,173	–
Registered voters/turnout		183,412	88.42
Source: Commission on Elections

== Quezon ==
=== Governor ===
Incumbent Governor Danilo Suarez of Lakas–CMD ran for a second term.

Suarez was defeated by representative Angelina Tan of the Nationalist People's Coalition. Five other candidates also ran for governor.

Candidate	Party	Votes	%
Angelina Tan	Nationalist People's Coalition	790,739	68.89
Danilo Suarez (incumbent)	Lakas–CMD	320,395	27.91
Angelita Tan	Kilusang Bagong Lipunan	13,122	1.14
Aeson Tan	Independent	8,524	0.74
Anny Suarez	People's Reform Party	7,288	0.63
Romy Suarez	Independent	4,165	0.36
Warren Sio	Independent	3,533	0.31
Total		1,147,766	100.00
Total votes		1,221,506	–
Registered voters/turnout		1,424,023	85.78
NPC gain from Lakas			
Source: Commission on Elections

=== Vice Governor ===
Term-limited incumbent Vice Governor Sam Nantes of Aksyon Demokratiko ran for mayor of Tayabas.

Nantes endorsed his mother, former Philippine Charity Sweepstakes Office board member Betty Nantes of Lakas–CMD, who was defeated by Lucena councilor Third Alcala of the Nationalist People's Coalition. Provincial board member Alona Villamor-Obispo (Kilusang Bagong Lipunan) and two other candidates also ran for vice governor.

Candidate	Party	Votes	%
Third Alcala	Nationalist People's Coalition	665,570	63.25
Betty Nantes	Lakas–CMD	283,588	26.95
Alona Villamor-Obispo	Kilusang Bagong Lipunan	91,963	8.74
Perlita Lavides	Independent	7,399	0.70
Teodorico Capina	Independent	3,816	0.36
Total		1,052,336	100.00
Total votes		1,221,506	–
Registered voters/turnout		1,424,023	85.78
NPC gain from Aksyon			
Source: Commission on Elections

=== Provincial Board ===
The Quezon Provincial Board is composed of 13 board members, 10 of whom are elected.

The Nationalist People's Coalition won seven seats, gaining a majority in the provincial board.

Party	Votes	%	Seats	+/–
Nationalist People's Coalition	984,084	47.33	7	+5
Nacionalista Party	408,758	19.66	2	–3
Lakas–CMD	269,371	12.96	0	–1
Aksyon Demokratiko	106,879	5.14	0	0
National Unity Party	83,661	4.02	1	New
People's Reform Party	75,777	3.64	0	New
PDP–Laban	74,158	3.57	0	–1
Workers' and Peasants' Party	21,613	1.04	0	New
Liberal Party	6,503	0.31	0	0
Independent	48,181	2.32	0	–1
Total	2,078,985	100.00	10	0
Total votes	1,221,506	–		
Registered voters/turnout	1,424,023	85.78		

==== 1st district ====
Quezon's 1st provincial district consists of the same area as Quezon's 1st legislative district. Two board members are elected from this provincial district.

Six candidates were included in the ballot.

Candidate	Party	Votes	%
Jerry Talaga (incumbent)	Nationalist People's Coalition	143,158	36.00
Julius Luces	Nationalist People's Coalition	94,781	23.84
Yayin Villaseñor	Lakas–CMD	75,046	18.87
Ferdinand Llamas II	Lakas–CMD	49,050	12.33
Waqui Kelly Portes	Aksyon Demokratiko	28,997	7.29
Joselito Santelices	Independent	6,622	1.67
Total		397,654	100.00
Total votes		307,457	–
Registered voters/turnout		365,650	84.09
Source: Commission on Elections

==== 2nd district ====
Quezon's 2nd provincial district consists of the same area as Quezon's 2nd legislative district. Three board members are elected from this provincial district.

Nine candidates were included in the ballot.

Candidate	Party	Votes	%
Vinnette Alcala	Nationalist People's Coalition	209,330	24.19
Yna Liwanag (incumbent)	Nacionalista Party	201,048	23.24
Bong Talabong	Nacionalista Party	193,125	22.32
Emerson Sio	Nationalist People's Coalition	135,291	15.64
Willy Baldonado	PDP–Laban	74,158	8.57
Erwin Perez	Independent	14,955	1.73
Adrian Tiongco	Nacionalista Party	14,585	1.69
Olivia Maaño	Independent	12,598	1.46
Randy Casiño	Independent	10,090	1.17
Total		865,180	100.00
Total votes		416,767	–
Registered voters/turnout		471,129	88.46
Source: Commission on Elections

==== 3rd district ====
Quezon's 3rd provincial district consists of the same area as Quezon's 3rd legislative district. Two board members are elected from this provincial district.

Seven candidates were included in the ballot.

Candidate	Party	Votes	%
Jet Suarez (incumbent)	National Unity Party	83,661	24.70
JJ Aquivido	Nationalist People's Coalition	78,225	23.10
Dominic Reyes	Aksyon Demokratiko	77,882	22.99
Erwin Esguerra	People's Reform Party	75,777	22.37
Rodolfo Orfanel	Nationalist People's Coalition	12,734	3.76
Rommel Anca	Liberal Party	6,503	1.92
Eduardo Dural	Independent	3,916	1.16
Total		338,698	100.00
Total votes		246,406	–
Registered voters/turnout		290,045	84.95
Source: Commission on Elections

==== 4th district ====
Quezon's 4th provincial district consists of the same area as Quezon's 4th legislative district. Three board members are elected from this provincial district.

Seven candidates were included in the ballot.

Candidate	Party	Votes	%
Sonny Ubana (incumbent)	Nationalist People's Coalition	125,811	26.35
Harold Butardo	Nationalist People's Coalition	103,681	21.72
Derick Magbuhos (incumbent)	Nationalist People's Coalition	81,073	16.98
Raquel Mendoza	Lakas–CMD	65,455	13.71
Arcie Malite	Lakas–CMD	49,135	10.29
Zeddrick Magbuhos	Lakas–CMD	30,685	6.43
Emy Mendoza	Workers' and Peasants' Party	21,613	4.53
Total		477,453	100.00
Total votes		250,876	–
Registered voters/turnout		297,199	84.41
Source: Commission on Elections

== Rizal ==
=== Governor ===
Incumbent Governor Rebecca Ynares of the Nationalist People's Coalition (NPC) was term-limited.

The NPC nominated Ynares' daughter, former Government Service Insurance System trustee Nina Ynares, who won the election against four other candidates.

Candidate	Party	Votes	%
Nina Ynares	Nationalist People's Coalition	952,019	85.52
Andrew Sumulong	Independent	95,791	8.60
Jose Velasco	Independent	28,734	2.58
Benedict Angeles	Independent	25,042	2.25
Bernard Dizon	Independent	11,628	1.04
Total		1,113,214	100.00
Total votes		1,298,078	–
Registered voters/turnout		1,601,962	81.03
NPC hold			
Source: Commission on Elections

=== Vice Governor ===
Incumbent Vice Governor Junrey San Juan of the Partido Federal ng Pilipinas ran for a third term.

San Juan won re-election against three other candidates.

Candidate	Party	Votes	%
Junrey San Juan (incumbent)	Partido Federal ng Pilipinas	515,006	56.53
Sonny Clemente	Pederalismo ng Dugong Dakilang Samahan	207,981	22.83
Patrick Ken Felix	Independent	160,871	17.66
King Balauro	Workers' and Peasants' Party	27,185	2.98
Total		911,043	100.00
Total votes		1,298,078	–
Registered voters/turnout		1,601,962	81.03
PFP hold			
Source: Commission on Elections

=== Provincial Board ===
The Rizal Provincial Board is composed of 14 board members, 10 of whom are elected.

The Nationalist People's Coalition won eight seats, gaining a majority in the provincial board.

Party	Votes	%	Seats	+/–
Nationalist People's Coalition	1,143,475	68.57	8	+2
PROMDI	131,962	7.91	0	New
PDP–Laban	118,460	7.10	1	New
National Unity Party	109,699	6.58	1	0
Aksyon Demokratiko	29,796	1.79	0	New
Pederalismo ng Dugong Dakilang Samahan	4,209	0.25	0	New
Independent	129,949	7.79	0	0
Total	1,667,550	100.00	10	0
Total votes	1,298,078	–		
Registered voters/turnout	1,601,962	81.03		

==== 1st district ====
Rizal's 1st provincial district consists of the same area as Rizal's 1st legislative district. Four board members are elected from this provincial district.

Five candidates were included in the ballot.

Candidate	Party	Votes	%
Ato Bernardo (incumbent)	Nationalist People's Coalition	221,006	23.45
Jun Cabitac (incumbent)	Nationalist People's Coalition	214,327	22.74
Jo Anne Saguinsin	Nationalist People's Coalition	191,615	20.33
Ross Glenn Gongora (incumbent)	Nationalist People's Coalition	183,530	19.47
Jules Narag	PROMDI	131,962	14.00
Total		942,440	100.00
Total votes		439,138	–
Registered voters/turnout		521,954	84.13
Source: Commission on Elections

==== 2nd district ====
Rizal's 2nd provincial district consists of the same area as Rizal's 2nd legislative district. The municipalities of San Mateo and Rodriguez used to be a part of this provincial district until 2021, when San Mateo formed the 3rd provincial district and Rodriguez formed the 4th provincial district. Two board members are elected from this provincial district.

Five candidates were included in the ballot.

Candidate	Party	Votes	%
Boboy Bernados	Nationalist People's Coalition	91,130	31.85
Hector Robles	Nationalist People's Coalition	88,344	30.87
Emmanuel Mendiola	Independent	54,968	19.21
Enchong Santos	Independent	33,371	11.66
Ron Briones	Independent	18,327	6.40
Total		286,140	100.00
Total votes		246,308	–
Registered voters/turnout		297,030	82.92
Source: Commission on Elections

==== 3rd district ====
Rizal's 3rd provincial district consists of the same area as Rizal's 3rd legislative district. The provincial district was created in 2021, with the municipality of San Mateo from the 2nd provincial district. One board member is elected from this provincial district.

Three candidates were included in the ballot.

Candidate	Party	Votes	%
John Patrick Bautista	Nationalist People's Coalition	41,651	53.22
Hermie Cequeña	PDP–Laban	30,429	38.88
Cirilo Oropesa Jr.	Aksyon Demokratiko	6,183	7.90
Total		78,263	100.00
Total votes		96,783	–
Registered voters/turnout		110,276	87.76
Source: Commission on Elections

==== 4th district ====
Rizal's 4th provincial district consists of the same area as Rizal's 4th legislative district. The provincial district was created in 2021, with the municipality of Rodriguez, Rizal from the 2nd provincial district. One board member is elected from this provincial district.

Nine candidates were included in the ballot.

Candidate	Party	Votes	%
Rommel Ayuson (incumbent)	PDP–Laban	88,031	63.27
Hoaman Valdeavilla	Aksyon Demokratiko	23,613	16.97
Celso Ocampo	Independent	7,843	5.64
Bobby Lago	Independent	4,727	3.40
Bench Pascual	Pederalismo ng Dugong Dakilang Samahan	4,209	3.03
Vhal Sanchez	Independent	3,032	2.18
Joel Malapo	Independent	2,926	2.10
Joe Cordova	Independent	2,790	2.01
Ritchie Fuentes	Independent	1,965	1.41
Total		139,136	100.00
Total votes		166,481	–
Registered voters/turnout		201,452	82.64
Source: Commission on Elections

==== Antipolo's 1st district ====
Antipolo's 1st provincial district consists of the same area as Antipolo's 1st legislative district. One board member is elected from this provincial district.

One candidate was included in the ballot.

Candidate	Party	Votes	%
Randy Puno (incumbent)	National Unity Party	109,699	100.00
Total		109,699	100.00
Total votes		163,397	–
Registered voters/turnout		215,070	75.97
Source: Commission on Elections

==== Antipolo's 2nd district ====
Antipolo's 2nd provincial district consists of the same area as Antipolo's 2nd legislative district. One board member is elected from this provincial district.

One candidate was included in the ballot.

Candidate	Party	Votes	%
Nilo Leyble	Nationalist People's Coalition	111,872	100.00
Total		111,872	100.00
Total votes		185,971	–
Registered voters/turnout		256,180	72.59
Source: Commission on Elections
