= Edna Sanchez =

Filipino politician

The Honorable Edna Sanchez

First Lady of Batangas
- In office June 30, 2004 – June 30, 2007
- Governor: Armando Sanchez
- Preceded by: Regina Reyes Mandanas
- Succeeded by: Ralph Recto

Mayor of Santo Tomas, Batangas
- In office June 30, 2013 – June 30, 2022
- Vice Mayor: Ferdinand Ramos (2013–2016); Armenius Silva (2016–2022)
- Preceded by: Renato Federico
- Succeeded by: Arthur Marasigan
- In office June 30, 2004 – June 30, 2010
- Vice Mayor: Renato Federico
- Preceded by: Armando Sanchez
- Succeeded by: Renato Federico

Personal details
- Born: Edna Padilla Bambang, Nueva Vizcaya
- Party: Nacionalista
- Spouse(s): Armando Sanchez (d. 2010)
- Children: 5

Edna Padilla Sanchez is a Filipino politician who served as the mayor of Santo Tomas from 2013 to 2022 and previously from 2004 until 2010. She was also the substitute candidate for governor in 2010 after her husband Armando Sanchez died on April 27; she eventually lost to incumbent Governor Vilma Santos.

Sanchez advocated for the successful cityhood of this town, thus making her as the first city mayor after its plebiscite in 2019.

She was married to Armando Sanchez, a former governor of Batangas and mayor of Santo Tomas; they had four children.

Political offices
Preceded by Renato Federico	Mayor of Santo Tomas, Batangas; 2013–2022	Succeeded by Arthur Marasigan
Preceded by Armando Sanchez	Mayor of Santo Tomas, Batangas; 2004–2010	Succeeded by Renato Federico
