= Vilma Santos =

Filipino actress and politician (born 1953)

The Honorable Vilma Santos
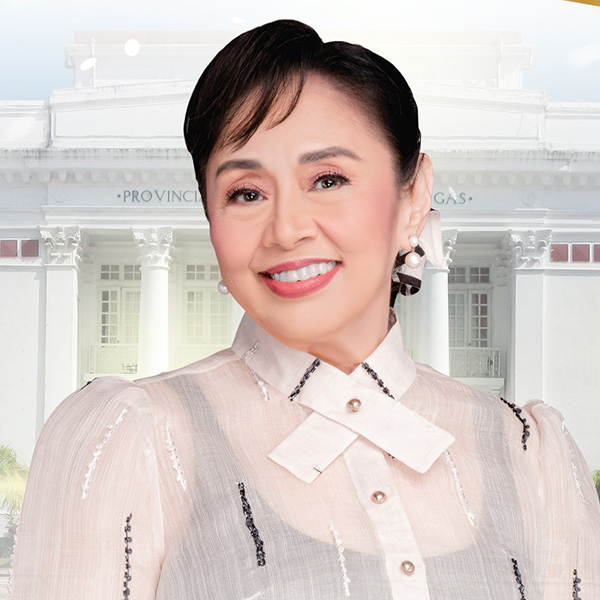
- Official portrait, 2025

23rd & 25th Governor of Batangas
- Incumbent
- Assumed office June 30, 2025
- Vice Governor: Hermilando Mandanas
- Preceded by: Hermilando Mandanas
- In office June 30, 2007 – June 30, 2016
- Vice Governor: Mark Leviste
- Preceded by: Armando Sanchez
- Succeeded by: Hermilando Mandanas

Deputy Speaker of the House of Representatives of the Philippines
- In office August 13, 2019 – June 30, 2022
- Speaker: Alan Peter Cayetano; Lord Allan Velasco

Member of the House of Representatives from Batangas' 6th district
- In office June 30, 2016 – June 30, 2022
- Preceded by: District established
- Succeeded by: Ralph Recto

Mayor of Lipa
- In office June 30, 1998 – June 30, 2007
- Vice Mayor: Fernando Manguera (1998–2003); Lydio Lopez, Jr. (2003–2007)
- Preceded by: Ruben Umali
- Succeeded by: Oscar Gozos

Personal details
- Born: Rosa Vilma Tuazon Santos; November 3, 1953 (age 72) Manila, Philippines
- Party: Nacionalista (2018–present)
- Other political affiliations: Liberal (2009–2018); Lakas (1998–2009)
- Spouses: Edu Manzano (m. 1980; div. 1982) Ralph Recto (m. 1992)
- Children: Luis Manzano; Ryan Recto
- Relatives: Jessy Mendiola (daughter-in-law)
- Occupation: Politician, actress, singer, dancer
- Military career
- Allegiance: Philippines
- Branch: Philippine Air Force; Air Force Reserve Command
- Service years: 2012–present
- Rank: Lieutenant Colonel

Rosa Vilma Tuazon Santos-Recto (born November 3, 1953) is a Filipino actress and politician serving as the Governor of Batangas since 2025, having previously held the position from 2007 to 2016. Known for her versatile work on screen, she began her career as a child actress in the 1960s and was one of the a major box-office draw in the 1970s and early 1980s. Her accolades include a Dhaka International Film Festival Award, thirteen FAMAS Awards, eleven Gawad Urian, and five Luna Awards. She served as the Mayor of Lipa from 1998 to 2007, then as the representative for Batangas' 6th district from 2016 to 2022, and as a House Deputy Speaker from 2019 to 2022.

== Acting career ==
Vilma Santos is widely considered the most lastingly successful Filipino film and television actress of all time. She was adjudged the greatest movie actress of the Philippines for the years 2000 to 2020 by the Philippine Entertainment Portal for her continued portrayal of a wide range of award-winning roles as well as for being a consistent box-office draw despite being in the industry for nearly six decades. Vilma's venture into politics made her semi-retire from showbusiness in the late 1990's yet she still emerged as the actress with the most number of best actress awards so far in the 21st century. According to the Film Academy of Movie Arts and Sciences Awards (FAMAS), she is the most awarded actress in acting history.

She started her acting career when one of her uncles, who was a cameraman at Sampaguita Pictures, convinced her to try out for the movies. Initially, Sampaguita Pictures had planned a child star role for her in Anak, Ang Iyong Ina (1963). When Santos was in the studio, she noticed a long line of little girls. Thinking that that line was the line for her audition, she decided to queue in. The long line turned out to be for an audition for Sampaguita Pictures' offering Trudis Liit (Little Trudis).

When it was her turn to audition, she was asked by the panel to sing, dance and cry on cue. She got the part of "Trudis Liit" for which she received the FAMAS Awards Best Child Performer award for 1963.

She was cast in Sa Bawat Pintig ng Puso (1964), Maria Cecilia (1965), Kasalanan Kaya? (1968), Iginuhit ng Tadhana (1965) and later in its sequel Pinagbuklod ng Langit (1969).

== Political career ==
=== Mayor of Lipa City ===
In 1998, she entered politics and ran for mayor of Lipa City, Batangas where she won three consecutive elections, becoming the city's first female mayor.

In 2005, the University of the Philippines Diliman conferred on her the Gawad Plaridel Award for her achievements and contributions both as an actress and a public servant. In the same year she was conferred an honorary doctorate degree (honoris causa) in humanities by the Lipa City College. She was again honored in 2006 by UP Diliman as one of the four awardees in UP's First Diwata Awards.

=== Governor of Batangas ===
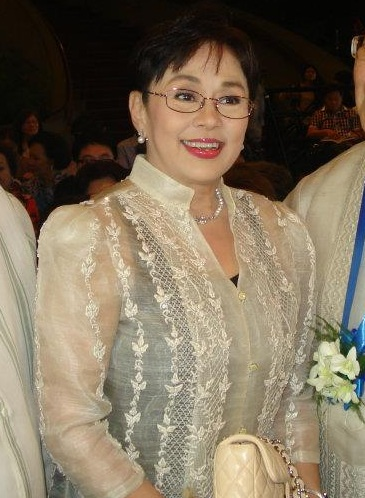
Vilma Santos - the Enduring Grand Dame of Philippine Cinema

Santos ran for governor of Batangas in the 2007 Philippine general election. She was proclaimed Governor-elect on May 21, 2007, after garnering 475,740 votes against incumbent Arman Sanchez's 344,969, becoming the first female governor of the province. She was reelected to her second term as Governor of Batangas in 2010, defeating incumbent Santo Tomas Mayor Edna Sanchez, who substituted her husband Arman Sanchez who died a few weeks before the election. She was re-elected to her third and final term as Governor in 2013.

On September 19, 2012, President Benigno S. Aquino III presented the Presidential Lingkod Bayan Award, considered the highest honor that a public servant can receive in the Philippines, to Governor Santos-Recto. She was cited for daring to fight the toughest battles of the Province of Batangas and for addressing the persistent overcrowding in Taal Lake to improve water quality and prevent fish kills.

=== Member, House of Representatives ===
After her election for her third and final term as Governor of Batangas, speculations circulated that Santos would run for the national level. However, she declined every offer to run for a higher level. She decided to run as the first representative of the newly formed 6th District of Batangas, would comprise only the City of Lipa. Santos-Recto won by a landslide, defeating Bernadette Sabili.

She is co-author of the SOGIE Equality bill (Anti-discrimination bill), Magna Carta for Day Care Workers, Maternity Leave Increase bill, Cancer Awareness bill, expanded Senior Citizens bill, and Post-graduate Education for Teachers bill.

In September 2018, she switched from the Liberal Party, where she was a member since 2009, to the Nacionalista Party.

On July 10, 2020, Santos became one of the 11 representatives who voted favor to grant ABS-CBN's legislative franchise.

=== Governor of Batangas (Fourth term) ===
Santos successfully ran again for governor of Batangas in the 2025 Philippine general election. Her son Ryan Christian Recto won the seat for the Batangas's 6th congressional district but Luis Manzano lost for the vice governor against the outgoing governor Hermilando Mandanas.

== Personal life ==
Vilma Santos-Recto has family roots in Cabanatuan City, Nueva Ecija.

She is married to Executive Secretary Ralph Recto. They have one son, named Ryan Christian. She also has one son, Luis Manzano from her previous marriage to Edu Manzano.

== Electoral history ==
Electoral history of Vilma Santos
Year	Office	Party	Votes received				Result
Year	Office	Party	Total	%	P.	Swing	Result
1998	Mayor of Lipa	Lakas	—N/a	—N/a	1st	—N/a	Won
2001	Mayor of Lipa	Lakas	—N/a	—N/a	1st	—N/a	Won
2004	Mayor of Lipa	Lakas	—N/a	—N/a	1st	—N/a	Won
2007	Governor of Batangas	Lakas	475,740	55.31%	1st	—N/a	Won
2010	Governor of Batangas	Liberal	603,159	59.63%	1st	+4.32	Won
2013	Governor of Batangas	Liberal	878,579	93.50%	1st	+33.87	Won
2025	Governor of Batangas	Nacionalista	655,034	42.09%	1st	-51.41	Won
2016	Representative (Batangas–6th)	Liberal	83,492	56.13%	1st	—N/a	Won
2019	Representative (Batangas–6th)	Nacionalista	96,743	61.01	1st	+4.88	Won

== Filmography ==
=== Television ===
Year	Title	Role
1963–1964	Larawan ng Pag-Ibig	
1970s	Ayan Eh!	
1970s	The Sensations	
1970s	Dulambuhay ni Rosa Vilma	
1982–1986	VIP (Vilma in Person)	Herself
1986–1995	Vilma	Host
1987	Palibhasa Lalake	Episode Guest
1987	Darna	Darna (voice)
1988	Lamat sa Kristal	
1991	Once There Was a Love	
1997	Katuparan	
1997	Kamandag sa Puso	
2007	Alay ni Da King: A Fernando Poe Jr. Special	Host
2007	Talk Toons	Episode Guest
2009	Vilma: A Woman for All Seasons (Documentary Special)	Host
2010	Maalaala Mo Kaya: Regalo	Daisy Hernandez
2011	Kapamilya, Deal or No Deal	Contestant
2011	100 Days to Heaven	Tagabantay
2015	ASAP 20	Herself
2023	Anim na Dekada… Nag-iisang Vilma	Herself
2023	It's Your Lucky Day	Guest co-host
2026	Kapamilya Deal or No Deal	Herself/Contestant (with Jessy Mendiola; won ₱125,000)

=== Film ===
Year	Title	Role
1963	Trudis Liit	Trudis
1963	Anak, ang Iyong Ina!	
1963	King & Queen for a Day	
1963	Duwelo sa Sapang Bato	
1963	Aninong Bakal	
1964	Ging	Ging
1964	Larawan ng Pag-ibig	
1964	Naligaw na Anghel	
1964	Sa Bawat Pintig ng Puso	
1965	Sa Baril Magtuos	
1965	Maria Cecilia	
1965	Morena Martir	
1965	Kay Tagal ng Umaga	
1965	Iginuhit ng Tadhana (The Ferdinand E. Marcos Story)	Imee Marcos
1966	Hindi Nahahati ang Langit	
1966	Hampaslupang Maton	
1966	Ito Ang Dahilan	
1966	Batang Iwahig	
1966	Ito Ang Pilipino	
1967	The Longest Hundred Miles	Maria
1968	De Colores	
1968	Kasalanan Kaya?	
1968	Eagle Commandos	
1968	Sino ang May Karapatan?	
1969	Pinagbuklod ng Langit	Imee Marcos
1969	Pag-ibig Masdan ang Ginawa Mo	
1969	My Darling Eddie	
1969	The Jukebox King	
1970	Our Lady of Peñafrancia (Patroness of Bicolandia)	Guest
1970	Mardy	
1970	Young Love	Vilma
1970	I Do Love You	
1970	Songs and Lovers	
1970	Bulaklak at Paru-Paro	
1970	My Pledge of Love	Vilma
1970	Love Is for the Two Of Us	
1970	From the Bottom of My Heart	
1970	The Young Idols	Vilma
1970	Sixteen	
1970	Because You Are Mine	
1970	Love Letters	Vilma
1970	Ding Dong	
1970	Sweethearts	
1970	Give Me Your Love	
1970	Mga Batang Bangketa	
1970	I Love You Honey	
1970	Edgar Loves Vilma	Vilma
1970	Mother Song	
1970	Sapagka't Sila’y Aming Mga Anak	
1970	Vilma, My Darling	Vilma
1970	Nobody's Child	
1970	May Hangganan ang Pag-ibig!	
1970	Baby Vi	Vi
1970	Renee Rose	Renee Rose
1971	My Love at First Sight	
1971	The Sensations	Vilma
1971	Angelica	Angelica
1971	The Wonderful World of Music	
1971	Young Lovers	Vilma
1971	Ikaw Lamang	
1971	Our Love Affair	
1971	Teenage Señorita	
1971	I'll Be Loving You... Eternally	
1972	Aloha My Love	
1972	Don't Ever Say Goodbye	
1972	Inspiration	Vilma
1972	Dulce Corazon	Dulce Corazon
1972	Little Darling	Vilma
1972	Remembrance	
1972	Sweet Sweet Love	
1972	Kundoktora	
1972	Dama de Noche	Rosanna / Armida
1972	Takbo, Vilma, Dali!	Vilma
1972	Hatinggabi Na, Vilma!	Vilma
1972	Tatlong Mukha ni Rosa Vilma	Rosa Vilma
1972	Dalagang Nayon	
1972	Leron-Leron Sinta	Beth
1973	Tsismosang Tindera	
1973	Now and Forever	Vilma
1973	Lipad, Darna, Lipad!	Narda / Darna
1973	Cariñosa	
1973	Dyesebel at ang Mahiwagang Kabibe	Dyesebel
1973	Anak ng Asuwang	
1973	Wonder Vi	Wonder Vi
1973	Ang Hiwaga ni Maria Cinderella	Maria
1973	Ophelia at Paris	Ophelia
1973	Darna and the Giants	Narda / Darna
1974	Vilma and the Beep Beep Minica	Vilma
1974	Phantom Lady	Phantom Lady
1974	Kampanerang Kuba	Andang / Sandra
1974	Batya't Palu-Palo	Stella
1974	Twin Fists for Justice	
1974	Biktima	Dolores
1974	Mga Tigre ng Sierracruz	
1974	Kamay na Gumagapang	
1974	Tok Tok Palatok	
1974	Vivian Volta	Vivian Volta
1974	Kill... The Carnappers	Guest
1974	Happy Days Are Here Again	Guest
1974	King Khayam and I	Princesa Gracia
1975	Basta't Isipin Mong Mahal Kita	
1975	Nakakahiya?	
1975	Ibong Lukaret	Ningning
1975	Dugo at Pag-ibig sa Kapirasong Lupa	Guest: Linda (segment 5)
1975	Teribol Dobol	Maria Teresa 'Maritess' Labrador
1975	Vilma Veinte-Nueve	Vilma
1975	Karugtong ang Kahapon	
1975	Tag-Ulan sa Tag-Araw	Nanette
1975	Darna vs. the Planet Women	Narda / Darna
1976	Hindi Nakakahiya Part II	
1976	Mga Reynang Walang Trono	
1976	Big Ike's Happening	Guest
1976	Let's Do the Salsa	
1976	Mapagbigay ang Mister Ko	
1976	Bertang Kerengkeng	Berta
1976	Bato sa Buhangin	Barbara "Bamba" Montinola
1976	Mga Rosas sa Putikan	
1976	Nag-aapoy na Damdamin	
1976	Makahiya at Talahib	Aurora
1977	Pulot-Gata (Pwede Kaya?)	Baby Abueva
1977	Susan Kelly Edad 20	Susan Kelly
1977	Dalawang Pugad... Isang Ibon	Terry
1977	Masarap, Masakit... Ang Umibig	
1977	Burlesk Queen	Chato / Czarina
1978	Pinagbuklod ng Pag-ibig	
1978	Bakit Kailangan Kita...	
1978	Simula ng Walang Katapusan	
1978	Amorseko Kumakabit, Kumakapit!	
1978	Nakawin Natin ang Bawat Sandali	
1978	Pagputi ng Uwak, Pag-itim ng Tagak	Julie Monserrat
1978	Kampus	Suzette Sandejas
1978	Mga Mata ni Angelita	Guest
1978	Huwag Hamakin: Hostess	Guest
1978	Promo Girl	
1978	Disco Fever	
1978	Pag-ibig Ko sa Iyo Lang Ibibigay	
1978	Ikaw Ay Akin	Sandra Aragon
1978	Rubia Servios Case No. 63572	Rubia Servios
1979	Coed	
1979	Swing It... Baby!	Marilen
1979	Pinay, American Style!	PX
1979	Magkaribal	
1979	Rock, Baby! Rock!	
1979	Halik sa Paa Halik sa Kamay	Christine
1979	Buhay Artista Ngayon	
1979	Modelong Tanso	Judy
1980	Good Morning Sunshine	
1980	Darna at Ding	Darna / Narda
1980	Miss X	Filomena Cruz
1980	Candy	Guest
1980	Yakapin Mo 'Ko, Lalaking Matapang	
1980	Ang Galing-galing Mo, Mrs. Jones	
1980	Gusto Kita, Mahal Ko Siya	
1980	Romansa	
1980	Langis at Tubig	Cory Jarlego
1981	Ex-Wife	
1981	Pakawalan Mo Ako	Anna
1981	Hiwalay	
1981	Karma	Sarah
1982	Relasyon	Maria Lourdes 'Marilou' Castañeda
1982	No Other Love	Guest Role
1982	Sinasamba Kita	Divina
1982	T-Bird at Ako	Isabel
1982	Never Ever Say Goodbye	
1982	Gaano Kadalas ang Minsan?	Lily
1982	The House in the Woods	Cristy
1983	Ayaw Kong Maging Querida	
1983	Paano Ba ang Mangarap?	Lisa
1983	Broken Marriage	Ellen
1983	Minsan Pa Nating Hagkan ang Nakaraan	Helen
1984	Adultery (Aida Macaraeg) Case No. 7892	Aida Macaraeg
1984	Sister Stella L.	Sister Stella Legaspi
1984	Alyas Baby Tsina	Elena Duavit
1984	Charot	Guest
1985	Muling Buksan ang Puso	Cristy
1985	Doctor, Doctor, We Are Sick	Rose
1986	Yesterday, Today & Tomorrow	Corina
1986	Palimos ng Pag-ibig	Fina
1986	Payaso	Guest
1987	Tagos ng Dugo	Josefina 'Pina' Ramos Regala
1987	Ibigay Mo sa Akin ang Bukas	Marie
1987	Asawa Ko Huwag Mong Agawin	Cathy Santillan
1987	Saan Nagtatago ang Pag-ibig?	Estella
1987	Takot Ako, Eh!	Guest
1988	Bukas Sisikat Din ang Araw	Guest: Sandra
1988	Ibulong Mo sa Diyos	Monica Quijano
1989	Pahiram ng Isang Umaga	Juliet Espiritu
1989	Arrest: Pat. Rizal Alih – Zamboanga Massacre	Jocelyn Alih
1989	Imortal	Natalia Avila/Alexandra Avila/Lara Alonzo-Lopez
1990	Iputok Mo... Dadapa Ako! (Hard to Die)	Guest: Lea Bustamante
1990	Once There Was a Love	
1990	Kapag Langit ang Humatol	Florida
1990	Hahamakin Lahat	Lucinda
1991	Ipagpatawad Mo	Selina Esquivel
1992	Sinungaling Mong Puso	Clara
1992	Engkanto	Guest: Inang Kalikasan
1993	Dahil Mahal Kita: The Dolzura Cortez Story	Dolzura Cortez
1993	Ikaw Lang	Celina
1994	Lipa Arandia Massacre	Helen Arandia
1994	Nag-iisang Bituin	Cecille
1994	Relaks Ka Lang, Sagot Kita	Atty. Vera Villaverde
1996	Ikaw ang Mahal Ko	Miling
1997	Hanggang Ngayon Ika’y Minamahal	Margot
1998	Bata Bata Paano Ka Ginawa?	Lea Bustamante
1998	Ang Erpat Kong Astig	Guest: Presiding Judge
2000	Anak	Josie Agbisit
2002	Dekada '70	Amanda Bartolome
2004	Mano Po III: My Love	Lilia Chiong-Yang
2006	D' Lucky Ones	Herself (Guest)
2006	Regalo	Daisy Hernandez
2009	In My Life	Shirley Templo
2012	The Healing	Seth
2013	The Bit Player	Loida Malabanan
2016	Everything About Her	Dr. Vivian S. Rabaya
2023	When I Met You in Tokyo	Azon
2024	Uninvited	Lilia Capistrano / Eva Candelaria

== Awards in film ==
Year	Award-giving body	Category	Nominated work	Result
1963	FAMAS Awards	Best Child Actress	Trudis Liit	Won
1968	San Beda College Awards	Best Supporting Actress	Kasalanan Kaya?	Won
1972	FAMAS Awards	Best Actress	Dama de Noche	Won
1975	Bacolod City Film Festival	Best Actress	Nakakahiya?	Won
1977	Metro Manila Film Festival	Best Actress	Burlesk Queen	Won
1978	FAMAS Awards	Best Picture	Pagputi ng Uwak, Pag-itim ng Tagak (as producer)	Won
1978	Gawad Urian	Best Picture	Pagputi ng Uwak, Pag-itim ng Tagak (as producer)	Won
1981	Cebu City Film Festival	Best Actress	Karma	Won
1981	Metro Manila Film Festival	Best Actress	Karma	Won
1981	FAMAS Awards	Best Actress	Pakawalan Mo Ako	Won
1982	Catholic Mass Media Awards	Best Actress	Relasyon	Won
1982	FAMAS Awards	Best Actress	Relasyon	Won
1982	FAP Awards	Best Actress	Relasyon	Won
1982	Gawad Urian	Best Actress	Relasyon	Won
1982	Let's Talk Movies Awards	Best Actress	Relasyon	Won
1983	Gawad Urian	Best Actress	Broken Marriage	Won
1984	Gawad Urian	Best Actress	Sister Stella L.	Won
1987	Catholic Mass Media Awards	Best Actress	Tagos ng Dugo	Won
1987	FAMAS Awards	Best Actress	Tagos ng Dugo	Won
1987	Movie Magazine Awards	Best Actress	Tagos ng Dugo	Won
1987	Cinemascoop Awards	Best Actress	Tagos ng Dugo	Won
1988	FAMAS Awards	Best Actress	Ibulong Mo sa Diyos	Won
1989	PMPC Star Awards	Best Actress	Pahiram Ng Isang Umaga	Won
1989	Gawad Urian	Best Actress	Pahiram Ng Isang Umaga	Won
1989	Movie Magazine Awards	Best Actress	Pahiram Ng Isang Umaga	Won
1989	Metro Manila Film Festival	Best Actress	Imortal	Won
1989	Channel 2 Viewers' Choice Award	Best Actress	Imortal	Won
1991	Gawad Urian	Best Actress	Ipagpatawad Mo	Won
1991	Movie Magazine Awards	Best Actress	Ipagpatawad Mo	Won
1991	Intrigue Magazine Reader's Choice Award	Best Actress	Ipagpatawad Mo	Won
1992	New Fame Magazine Readers' Choice Award	Best Actress	Sinungaling Mong Puso	Won
1992	FAMAS Awards	Circle of Excellence	Sinungaling Mong Puso	Won
1993	Manila Film Festival	Best Actress	Dolzura Cortez Story	Won
1993	Gawad Urian	Best Actress	Dolzura Cortez Story	Won
1993	FAP Awards	Best Actress	Dolzura Cortez Story	Won
1993	Movie Magazine Awards	Best Actress	Dolzura Cortez Story	Won
1993	PMPC Star Awards	Best Actress	Dolzura Cortez Story	Won
1993	Intrigue Magazine Readers' Choice Award	Best Actress	Dolzura Cortez Story	Won
1993	New Fame Magazine Readers' Choice Award	Best Actress	Dolzura Cortez Story	Won
1993	FAMAS Awards	Circle of Excellence	Dolzura Cortez Story	Won
1998	Film Desk of the Young Critics Circle	Best Actress	Bata, Bata...Paano ka Ginawa?	Won
1998	Gawad Urian	Best Actress	Bata, Bata...Paano ka Ginawa?	Won
1998	FAP Awards	Best Actress	Bata, Bata...Paano ka Ginawa?	Won
1998	PMPC Star Awards	Best Actress	Bata, Bata...Paano ka Ginawa?	Won
1998	Gawad Sineng-Sine PASADO Awards	Best Actress	Bata, Bata...Paano ka Ginawa?	Won
1998	Siasi, Jolo Critics Awards	Best Actress	Bata, Bata...Paano ka Ginawa?	Won
1999	Brussels International Film Festival	Best Actress	Bata, Bata...Paano ka Ginawa?	Won
2000	Gawad Sineng-Sine PASADO Awards	Best Actress	Anak	Won
2000	PMPC Star Awards	Best Actress	Anak	Won
2002	Film Desk of the Young Critics Circle	Best Actress	Dekada '70	Won
2002	Gawad Urian	Best Actress	Dekada '70	Won
2002	FAP Awards	Best Actress	Dekada '70	Won
2002	PMPC Star Awards	Best Actress	Dekada '70	Won
2002	Gawad Sineng-Sine PASADO Awards	Best Actress	Dekada '70	Won
2002	Gawad TANGLAW Awards	Best Actress	Dekada '70	Won
2002	Cinema One's RAVE Awards Critic's Choice	Best Performer	Dekada '70	Won
2002	Cinema One's RAVE Awards People's Choice	Best Performer	Dekada '70	Won
2002	CineManila International Film Festival	Best Actress	Dekada '70	Won
2003	S Magazine	Actress of the Year	Dekada '70	Won
2004	Metro Manila Film Festival	Best Actress	Mano Po 3	Won
2004	Gawad Suri Awards	Best Actress	Mano Po 3	Won
2004	Gawad Tanglaw	Best Actress	Mano Po 3	Won
2004	PMPC Star Awards	Best Actress	Mano Po 3	Won
2009	MTRCB Film Awards	Best Actress	In My Life	Won
2009	Gawad Suri Awards	Best Actress	In My Life	Won
2009	Gawad Tanglaw	Best Actress	In My Life	Won
2009	PMPC Star Awards	Best Actress	In My Life	Won
2009	Gawad Genio	Best Actress	In My Life	Won
2009	GMMSF	Best Actress	In My Life	Won
2013	Cinemalaya Film Festival	Best Actress	Ekstra	Won
2013	Gawad Tanglaw	Best Actress	Ekstra	Won
2013	Golden Screen Awards	Best Actress	Ekstra	Won
2014	Dhaka International Film Festival	Best Actress	Ekstra	Won
2015	International Indie Fest	Award of Merit Special Mention as Lead Actress	Ekstra	Won
2015	New York Film and TV Festival	Bronze World Medal	Ekstra (As Producer)	Won
2015	Worldfest Houston International Film Festival	Platinum Remi (Comedy)	Ekstra (As Producer)	Won
2015	Worldfest Houston International Film Festival	Best Foreign Language Film	Ekstra (As Producer)	Won
2017	PMPC Star Awards	Best Actress	Everything About Her	Won
2017	Gawad Sineng-Sine PASADO Awards	Best Actress	Everything About Her	Won
2017	GEMS (Guild Of Educators, Mentors And Students)	Best Actress	Everything About Her	Won
2017	EDDYS Entertainment Editors' Awards	Best Actress	Everything About Her	Won
2017	GMMSF	Best Actress	Everything About Her	Won
2017	EdukCircle Awards	Most Influential Film Actress of the Year	Everything About Her	Won
2017	PEP	Female Movie Star of the Year	Everything About Her	Won
2023	Metro Manila Film Festival	Best Actress	When I Met You in Tokyo	Won
2024	Manila International Film Festival	Best Actress	When I Met You in Tokyo	Won
2024	GMMSF	Best Actress	When I Met You in Tokyo	Won
2024	FAMAS Awards	Circle of Excellence	When I Met You in Tokyo	Won
2024	WCEJA	World Class Best Actress	When I Met You in Tokyo	Won
2024	PMPC Star Awards	Best Actress	When I Met You in Tokyo	Won
2025	Platinum Stallion National Media Awards	Best Actress	Uninvited	Won
2025	FAMAS Awards	Circle of Excellence	Uninvited	Won
2025	GEMS (Guild Of Educators, Mentors And Students)	Best Actress	Uninvited	Won
2025	Gawad PASADO	Best Actress	Uninvited	Won
2025	Gawad Tanglaw	Best Actress	Uninvited	Won
2025	PMPC Star Awards	Best Actress	Uninvited	Won

- 1983 – FAMAS Medallion of Excellence (Child Actress)
- 1983 – FAMAS Medallion of Excellence (Lead Actress)
- 1983 – FAMAS Medallion of Excellence (Producer)
- 1989 – FAMAS Hall of Fame
- 1990 – PMPC Star Awards Darling of the Press
- 1990 – Gawad Urian Aktres ng Dekada '80 (Actress of the Decade '80)
- 1997 – FAP Lifetime Achievement Award
- 1998 – FAMAS Lifetime Achievement Award
- 1999 – PMPC Star Awards Special Citation for winning at the Brussels Int'l Film Festival
- 1999 – Natatanging Artista ng Taon
- 2000 – Gawad Urian Aktress ng Dekada '90(Actress of Decade '90)
- 2000 – Cinemanila Lifetime Achievement Award
- 2000 – Pelikula At Lipunan Special Award
- 2002 – Cinemanila Lifetime Achievement Award
- 2004 – Natatanging Gawad Tanglaw
- 2005 – PMPC Star Dekada Award in Acting
- 2005 – Feminist Centennial Filmfest – Outstanding Achievement in Film Acting
- 2005 – GAWAD PLARIDEL for Outstanding Achievement in Film
- 2005 – GMMSF All-Time Favorite Actress
- 2005 – Gawad Suri Award for Exemplary Film Practitioner
- 2006 – First Pioneer Filipino Animation Awards – for Darna, given by the United Animation Inc. and United Staffing Registry Inc.
- 2006 – University of the Philippines Diwata Awards
- 2008 – 25th PMPC Star Awards Lifetime Achievement Awardee
- 2008 – Fil-Am Visionary Legend Award
- 2009 – 7th ENPRESS Golden Screen Awards Lifetime Achievement Awardee
- 2009 – FAMAS Exemplary Achievement Awardee
- 2009 – Cinema One Original Filmfest Legend Award
- 2011 – Golden Screen Awards Movie Icon of our Time Awardee
- 2011 – Gawad Tanglaw Artista Ng Dekada
- 2012 – Yahoo Awards Major Impact
- 2014 – Cinema One Numero Uno Icon Award
- 2015 – NCCA Ani ng Dangal for Ekstra
- 2016 – FAMAS Presidential Award
- 2016 – FAP Golden Reel Award
- 2017 – Gawad Tanglaw Presidential Jury Award - Best Film Performance
- 2017 – PMPC Star Awards for Movies Ginintuang Bituin ng Penikulang Pilipino
- 2017 – Natatanging Gawad Urian
- 2019 – Gawad Pasado Best Actress Hall of Fame (Films Bata Bata Paano Ka Ginawa?,(1998), Anak (2000), Dekada 70 (2002), Everything About Her (2017)
- 2019 – MMFF Best Actress Hall of Fame
- 2019 – PMPC Star Awards for Movies Natatanging Bituin ng Siglo
- 2019 – SPEED Awards for Movies – Eddys Icon Awards
- 2021 – PEP Greatest Movie Actress for the Years 2000-2021
- 2022 – MMFF Marichu Vera Perez Memorial Award
- 2023 – FDCP Sining Lifetime Achievement Award
- 2024 – GAWAD DANGAL - Lifetime Achievement Award
- 2024 – PMPC - Dekada Award
- 2024 – EdukSine- Pinay American Style - Gawad Alamat ng Sineng Filipino sa Harap ng Camera
- 2024 – CCP Cine Icons Series - Anak - UST - Award of Excellence
- 2024 – CCP Cine Icons Series - Anak - SPUQC - Certificate of Appreciation
- 2024 – FDCP - Tagos ng Dugo - Cinematheque - Certificate of Appreciation
- 2024 – FDCP - Bata, Bata, Paano Ka Ginawa? - Metropolitan Theater - Certificate of Appreciation
- 2025 – Asian Torch of Excellence Award - Hall of Fame
- 2025 – Southeast Asian Achievement Awards - Most Outstanding Showbiz Personality and Public Servant of The Year 2025
- 2025 – Manila International Film Festival - Lifetime Achievement Award
- 2025 – Gawad PASADO – Hall of Fame
- 2025 – PMPC Star Awards – Female Star of the Night

== Awards in television ==
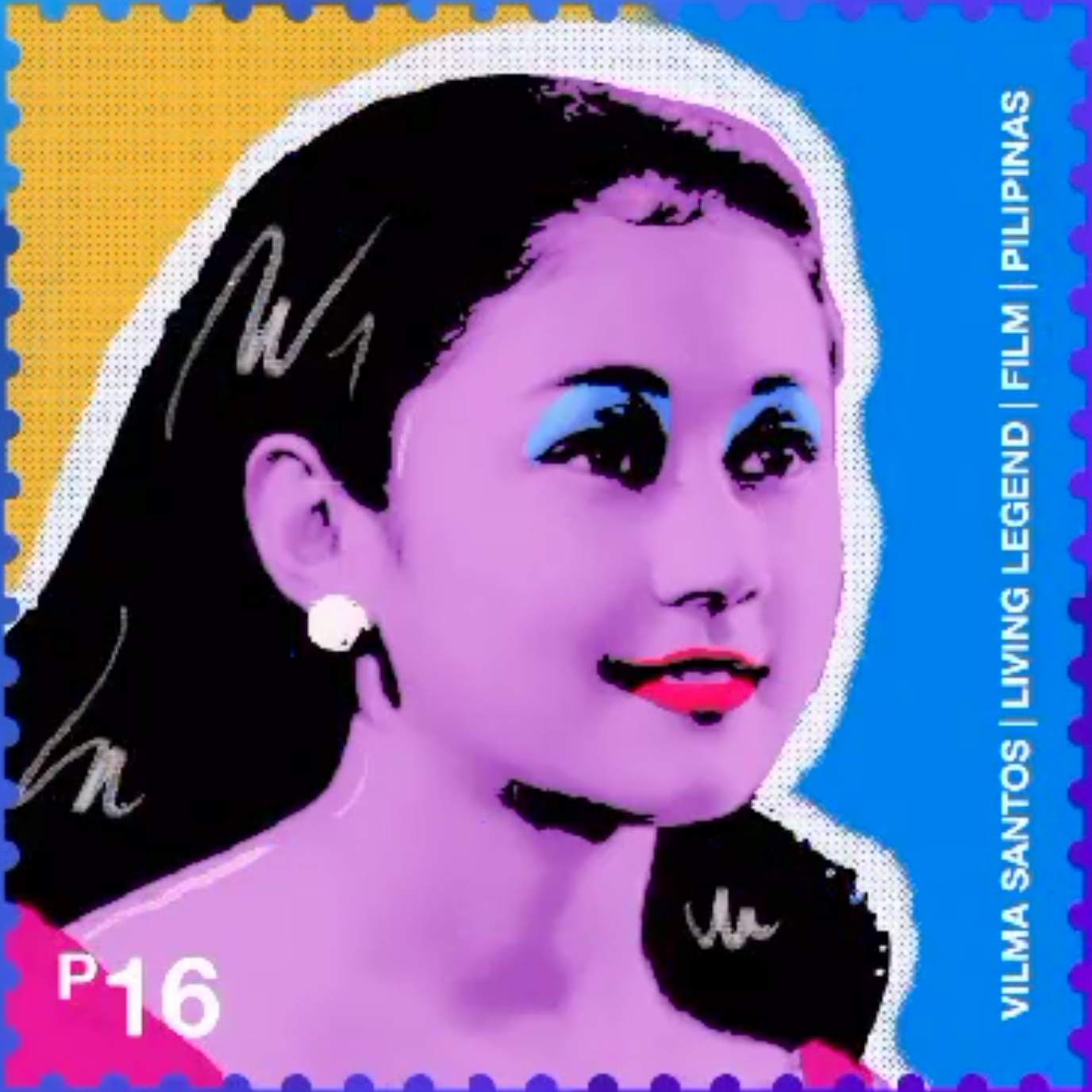
Santos on a 2022 stamp of the Philippines

Year	Award-giving body	Category	Nominated work	Results
1972	Emee Awards for TV	Most Effective Actress	Dalambuhay ni Rosa Vilma	Won
1975	PATAS	Outstanding Actress	Dalambuhay ni Rosa Vilma	Won
1975	PATAS	Outstanding Television Performer	The Sensations	Won
1987	PMPC Star Awards for TV	Best Musical Variety Show Host	Vilma	Won
1988	PMPC Star Awards for TV	Best Musical Variety Show Host	Vilma	Won
1991	PMPC Star Awards for TV	Best Drama Special	Once There Was a Love	Won
2006	PMPC Star Awards for TV	Best Actress in a Single TV Performance	Maala-ala Mo Kaya: "Regalo"	Won

- 1998 – Ading Fernando Lifetime Achievement Award – Star Awards for TV

== Discography ==
=== Albums ===
- 2000 – Anak Soundtrack
- 2005 – Vilma (CD, collection of 23 songs)

=== Songs/covers ===
- 1969 – "Sixteen"
- 1969 – "Da Doo Ron Ron"
- 1969 – "Wonderful to Be in Love"
- 1969 – "I Saw Mommy Kissing Santa Claus"
- 1970 – "Breaking Up Is Hard to Do"
- 1970 – "Something Stupid"
- 1970 – "Bring Back Your Love"
- 1970 – "You're All I Want for Christmas"
- 1970 – "I Wonder Why"
- 1971 – "Abadaba Honeymoon"
- 1971 – "Bobby, Bobby, Bobby"
- 1971 – "Dry Your Eyes"
- 1971 – "Love, Love"
- 1971 – "It's Been a Long Long Time"
- 1971 – "Baby Cakes"
- 1971 – "I Love You Honey"
- 1971 – "Then Along Came You, Edgar"
- 1971 – "Mandolin in the Moonlight"
- 1971 – "Sealed with a Kiss"
- 1971 – "Tweddle Dee"
- 1971 – "Raindrops Keep Falling on My Head"
- 1971 – "Don't You Break My Heart"
- 1971 – "Wonderful World of Music"
- 1971 – "You Made Me Love You"
- 1971 – "The Birds and the Bees"
- 1972 – "Rick Tick Song"
- 1972 – "Sad Movies (Make Me Cry)"
- 1972 – "My Boy Lollipop"
- 1973 – "Palung-Palo Ako"
- 1973 – "Walang Umiibig"
- 1974 – "Tok Tok Palatok"
- 1974 – "Isipin Mong Basta't Mahal Kita"
- 1974 – "Batya't Palu Palo"
- 1974 – "Mamang Kutsero"
- 1976 – "Mga Rosas sa Putikan"

== Awards in music ==
Year	Award-giving body	Category	Nominated work	Results
1971	Awit Awards	Best Single	"Sixteen"	Won
1971	Awit Awards	Best Mini-Album	"Something Stupid" with Edgar Mortiz	Won

Awards
Preceded by Amy Austria for Brutal	FAMAS Award for Best Actress; 1982 for Pakawalan Mo Ako	Succeeded by Herself for Relasyon
Preceded by Herself for Pakawalan Mo Ako	FAMAS Award for Best Actress; 1983 for Relasyon	Succeeded by Charito Solis for Don't Cry for Me, Papa
Preceded by Dina Bonnevie for Magdusa Ka	FAMAS Award for Best Actress; 1988 for Tagos ng Dugo	Succeeded by Herself for Ibulong Mo Sa Diyos
Preceded by Herself for Tagos ng Dugo	FAMAS Award for Best Actress; 1989 for Ibulong Mo Sa Diyos	Succeeded by Nora Aunor for Bilangin ang mga Bituin sa Langit
Political offices
Preceded by Ruben Umali	Mayor of Lipa, Batangas; 1998–2007	Succeeded by Oscar Gozos
Preceded by Armando Sanchez	Governor of Batangas; 2007–2016	Succeeded by Hermilando Mandanas
House of Representatives of the Philippines
New district	Representative, 6th District of Batangas; 2016–2022	Succeeded by Ralph Recto
