= National Tax Allotment =

The National Tax Allotment (NTA) is a local government unit’s (LGU) share of revenues from the Philippine national government. Provinces, independent cities, component cities, municipalities, and barangays each get a separate allotment.

The allotment is largely based upon the type of government they are and a formula based upon their land area and population. Section 284 of the Local Government Code of the Philippines (RA 7160) sets up the formula for the distribution of the allotment.

All or nearly all of the revenue that a local government has to spend comes from their IRA, though some local governments also have additional local sources of revenue such as property taxes and government fees. Typically for municipalities, the IRA accounts for 90% of total revenues. Since cities have more sources of local revenues, their IRA ranges from 50% to 70% of their total budget.

A portion of each local government unit's allotment is set aside their Sangguniang Kabataan (SK) or youth council.

The NTA is automatically released to each local government unit and may not be held back by the national government for any reason, except in the extreme case of an "unmanageable public sector deficit", in which case the allotment may be adjusted but provided it not be set to "be less than thirty percent (30%) of the collection of national internal revenue taxes of the third fiscal year preceding the current fiscal year".

This allotment, formerly known as Internal Revenue Allotment (IRA) after the dispensation of the Mandanas v. Ochoa ruling of the Supreme Court, was renamed since the passage of the 2022 General Appropriations Act (2022 Budget).
