= Mandanas v. Ochoa =

- Court: Supreme Court of the Philippines en banc
Full case name
Congressman Hermilando I. Mandanas; Mayor Efren B. Diona; Mayor Antonino A. Aurelio; Kagawad Mario Ilagan; Barangay Chair Perlito Manalo; Barangay Chair Medel Medrano; Barangay Kagawad Cris Ramos; Barangay Kagawad Elisa D. Balbago, and Atty. Jose Malvar Villegas, Petitioners, v. Executive Secretary Paquito N. Ochoa, Jr.; Secretary Cesar Purisima, Department of Finance; Secretary Florencio H. Abad, Department of Budget and Management; Commissioner Kim Jacinto-Henares, Bureau of Internal Revenue; and National Treasurer Roberto Tan, Bureau of the Treasury, Respondents
One consolidated petition
Honorable Enrique T. Garcia, Jr., in His Personal and Official Capacity as Representative of the 2nd District of the Province of Bataan, Petitioner, v. Honorable [Paquito] N. Ochoa, Jr., Executive Secretary; Honorable Cesar V. Purisima, Secretary, Department of Finance; Honorable Florencio H. Abad, Secretary, Department of Budget and Management; Honorable Kim S. Jacinto-Henares, Commissioner, Bureau of Internal Revenue; and Honorable Rozzano Rufino B. Biazon, Commissioner, Bureau of Customs, Respondents
- Decided: July 3, 2018
- G.R. numbers: 199802 and 208488
- Citation: 835 Phil. 97

Case history
- Prior action(s): None, Supreme Court was first instance of both consolidated petitions
- Subsequent action(s): Motion for reconsideration denied on April 10, 2019

Questions presented
- Whether or not the manner the Internal Revenue Allotment has been computed is in compliance with the Constitution's mandate that local governments are entitled to a "just share" of national taxes

Holding
- Ponente: Lucas Bersamin
- The phrase "internal revenue" in Section 284 of the Local Government Code and in other portions of the law or its implementing rules and regulations where it applies is declared unconstitutional. The Department of Finance, the Department of Budget and Management, the Bureau of Internal Revenue and the Bureau of Customs are also to include all national tax collections when determining the baseline for the LGUs' 40% allotment.
- Majority: Lucas Bersamin, joined by Antonio Carpio, Teresita de Castro, Diosdado Peralta, Mariano del Castillo, Estela Perlas-Bernabe, Samuel Martires, Noel Tijam and Alexander Gesmundo
- Concurrence: Presbitero Velasco Jr.
- Dissent: Marvic Leonen
- Dissent: Alfredo Benjamin Caguioa
- Dissent: Andres Reyes Jr.
- Francis Jardeleza took no part in the consideration or decision of the case.

Laws applied
- Local Government Code; National Internal Revenue Code

Keywords
- Local government

Mandanas v. Ochoa, 835 Phil. 97 (2018), is a landmark 2018 decision by the Supreme Court of the Philippines that fundamentally altered the fiscal framework of the country's decentralized government. Consolidated with another similar petition, Garcia v. Ochoa (G.R. No. 208488), the case is also commonly referred to as the Mandanas–Garcia ruling.

The Supreme Court ruled that the "just share" of local government units (LGUs) must be computed based on all national taxes, rather than being limited only to the internal revenue taxes collected by the Bureau of Internal Revenue (BIR). As a result, the ruling triggered the transition from the Internal Revenue Allotment (IRA) to the National Tax Allotment (NTA), significantly increasing the annual budget allocations distributed to provinces, cities, municipalities, and barangays starting in fiscal year 2022.

== Background ==
Following the enactment of the Local Government Code of 1991 (Republic Act No. 7160), political and administrative powers were decentralized from the national government to LGUs. To fund their newly devolved functions, Section 284 of the Code stipulated that LGUs would receive a 40% share of the "national internal revenue taxes" collected in the third fiscal year preceding the current year.

However, Article X, Section 6 of the 1987 Philippine Constitution explicitly states that LGUs shall have a just share in the "national taxes," not just "internal revenue taxes." Interpreting this as a violation of the Constitution, two separate petitions were filed before the Supreme Court by incumbent Batangas Governor Hermilando Mandanas (G.R. No. 199802) and former Bataan Governor Enrique Garcia Jr. (G.R. No. 208488), arguing that the national government had unlawfully deprived LGUs of their rightful budget by excluding customs duties and other non-BIR tax collections from the computation.

== Supreme Court decision ==
On July 3, 2018, the Supreme Court ruled in favor of the petitioners. The Court declared the phrase "internal revenue" in Section 284 of the Local Government Code unconstitutional. The decision mandated the Department of Finance, the Department of Budget and Management (DBM), the BIR, and the Bureau of Customs (BOC) to include all national tax collections—such as tariffs, customs duties, value-added tax (VAT), and excise taxes—when determining the baseline for the LGUs' 40% allotment.

The Court affirmed its decision on April 10, 2019, making it final and executory. Because the Code dictates that the computation is based on tax collections from three years prior, the financial effect of the ruling was set to be implemented in the 2022 national budget.

== Implementation and devolution ==
To manage the substantial transfer of wealth and responsibilities, President Rodrigo Duterte signed Executive Order (EO) No. 138 on June 1, 2021. The directive laid out the framework for the full devolution of basic services and facilities from the national executive branch to local governments, a process targeted for completion between 2022 and 2024.

Under EO 138, national government agencies and LGUs were required to create and submit Devolution Transition Plans (DTPs) detailing how responsibilities for public works, health care, social welfare, and agricultural services would be permanently turned over to local administrations.

== Issues and challenges ==
While the ruling drastically increased the total budget pool for LGUs (increasing the 2022 allocation by an estimated 55%), it exposed structural weaknesses in Philippine decentralization.

- Capacity Limitations: Many municipalities lacked the technical expertise and manpower to absorb and execute major infrastructure and social service projects formerly handled by the national government.
- Horizontal Fiscal Inequality: The existing allotment formula strictly relies on land area and population rather than poverty incidence or actual fiscal need. Consequently, wealthier urban cities receive massive budget windfalls, while lower-income municipalities still struggle to fund basic devolved services.
- Local Health Systems: Concerns were raised regarding the fragmentation of the healthcare system. With the burden of financing rural health units and local hospitals shifting heavily to LGUs, there were fears that health budgets might be sidelined by local chief executives in favor of more politically visible infrastructure projects.

To mitigate these disparities, policy researchers and the World Bank advocated for the implementation of strong fiscal equalization programs, such as a Growth Equity Fund, to directly subsidize disadvantaged municipalities struggling with the transition.
