= Mayor of Lipa, Batangas =

Head of the local government of Lipa, Batangas

Mayor of Lipa
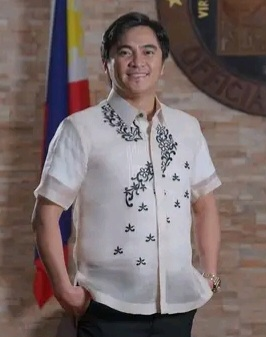
- Incumbent; Eric Africa since June 30, 2019
- Appointer: Elected via popular vote
- Term length: 3 years
- Inaugural holder: Esteban Mayo
- Formation: 1947

The mayor of Lipa (Filipino: Punong Lungsod ng Lipa) is the head of the local government of Lipa in Batangas who elected to three year terms. The Mayor is also the executive head and leads the city's departments in executing the city ordinances and improving public services. The city mayor is restricted to three consecutive terms, totaling nine years, although a mayor can be elected again after an interruption of one term.

Eric Africa is the incumbent mayor of the city since June 2019.

== List of mayors of Lipa ==
No.	Image	Mayor	Starting date	Ending date
1		Esteban Mayo	June 20, 1947	December 31, 1951
2		Jose Kalaw	January 1, 1952	December 31, 1953
3		Baldomero Reyes	January 1, 1954	December 31, 1959
4		Miguel Lina	January 1, 1960	December 31, 1969
5		Reynaldo Reyes	January 1, 1970	December 31, 1971
6		Carlos Solis	January 1, 1972	March 25, 1986
7		Ruben Umali	March 26, 1986	June 30, 1998
8		Vilma Santos	June 30, 1998	June 30, 2007
9		Oscar Gozos	June 30, 2007	June 30, 2010
10		Meynardo Sabili	June 30, 2010	June 30, 2019
11		Eric B. Africa	June 30, 2019	present
