= Oscar Gozos =

Filipino politician

The Honorable Oscar L. Gozos
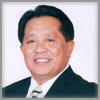

Mayor of Lipa
- In office June 30, 2007 – June 30, 2010
- Preceded by: Vilma Santos
- Succeeded by: Meynardo A. Sabili

Member of the Philippine House of Representatives from Batangas's 4th congressional district
- In office June 30, 2001 – June 30, 2007
- Preceded by: Ralph Recto
- Succeeded by: Mark Llandro Mendoza

Personal details
- Born: September 12, 1950 (age 76) Rosario, Batangas, Philippines
- Party: Lakas-CMD
- Spouse: Nilda Mercado
- Education: University of the Philippines
- Occupation: Lawyer
- Profession: Politician

Oscar Gozos (born September 12, 1950) is a Filipino politician who last served as Mayor of Lipa City, Batangas from 2007 to 2010.

== Education ==
He was salutatorian when he finished his elementary in Our Lady of Rosary Academy in Lipa City, Batangas on 1961. Since he studied in a Catholic school in his elementary days, he decided to enter a seminary for his high school. He finished high school in St. Francis de Sales Seminary in Lipa City. He took up AB Political Science in University of the Philippines. He obtained his Bachelor of Laws from the same university in 1976.

== Lawyer ==
After becoming a lawyer he became a managing partner of Gozos, Marquez, De Jesus, Linatoc Law Offices. He was also an original partner for Manalo Puno Gozos and Mendoza Law Offices.

== Past government positions ==
Year	Office	Position
2001–2007	House of Representatives	Representative, 4th District of Batangas
1995–2001	Office of the Provincial Prosecutor	Chief Provincial Prosecutor
1988–1992	Sangguniang Panlalawigan, Batangas Province	Provincial Board Member
1987	Presidential Commission on Good Government	Fiscal Agent
1986	City of Lipa	Acting City Administrator
1978–1979	Office of the City Fiscal, Batangas City	Special Counsel
1971	Constitutional Convention	Researcher

== Personal life ==
Gozos is married to Nilda Mercado.

== Notes ==
Political offices
Preceded by Vilma Santos-Recto	Mayor of Lipa City, Batangas; 2007 – 2010	Succeeded by Meynardo A. Sabili
House of Representatives of the Philippines
Preceded by Ralph Recto	Representative, 4th District of Batangas; 2001 – 2007	Succeeded by Mark L. Mendoza
