= Armando Sanchez =

Filipino politician

22nd Governor of Batangas
- In office June 30, 2004 – June 30, 2007
- Vice Governor: Richard Recto
- Preceded by: Hermilando Mandanas
- Succeeded by: Vilma Santos Recto

Mayor of Santo Tomas, Batangas
- In office June 30, 1998 – June 30, 2004
- Preceded by: Leopoldo Laurel
- Succeeded by: Edna Sanchez

Personal details
- Born: June 15, 1952 Santo Tomas, Batangas, Philippines
- Died: April 27, 2010 (aged 57) Lipa, Batangas, Philippines
- Party: Nacionalista (2009–2010)
- Other political affiliations: KAMPI (2007–2009); Liberal (2004–2007); Lakas (1998–2004)
- Spouse: Edna Sanchez
- Children: 4
- Occupation: Politician
- Profession: Engineer

Armando Carpio Sanchez (June 15, 1952 – April 27, 2010) was a Filipino politician. He is a former two-term mayor of Santo Tomas, Batangas, and one-term governor of the Province of Batangas. During his term as governor, he was also the treasurer of the League of Provinces of the Philippines.

== Political career ==
=== Mayor of Santo Tomas, Batangas ===
During the 1998 elections, he ran for mayor of Santo Tomas, Batangas, which he subsequently won.

=== Batangas Governorship ===
After two terms as mayor of Sto. Tomas, he decided to run as Batangas Governor. He ran as the Liberal Party official candidate during the 2004 elections. His opponents included former Justice Secretary Hernando Perez, former Board Member Dennis F. Hernandez and former Nasugbu Mayor Rosario Apacible.

One of his projects during his term was the beautification of Batangas Capitol Grounds. He facilitated the relocation of national government agencies and squatters who occupied a portion of the Capitol Grounds.

During his governorship, allegations of corruption surfaced. On May 30, 2005, Batangas ombudsman and graft investigator Guillermo Gamo was gunned down in Batangas City on his way to the capitol. At the time, Gamo was investigating what he described as multimillion-peso anomalous deals and projects at the capitol.

On April 13, 2015, Melinda “Mei” Magsino, a journalist of the Philippine Daily Inquirer until 2005 who covered corruption and illegal gambling ("jueteng") issues in Batangas, was also shot dead. Records from the National Union of Journalists in the Philippines (NUJP) showed that Magsino reported “threats” to her life sometime in 2005, during which she exposed alleged corruption and illegal gambling activities of late Batangas Governor Armando Sanchez.

==== Assassination attempt ====
Sanchez survived an assassination attempt on June 1, 2006, when he was able to get out of his Hummer H2 that exploded while boarding it inside the Batangas Capitol Grounds. His driver and bodyguard were killed during the explosion.

==== 2007 Elections ====
During the 2007 elections, Sanchez opted to run for re-election as governor. He was the official candidate of Kampi, a pro-administration party. He faced Lipa City Mayor Vilma Santos-Recto who was the official candidate of Lakas–CMD, another pro-administration party. Since two pro-administration candidates were battling it out for the governorship of Batangas, administration officials opted to declare the Province of Batangas a "free-zone".

Santos-Recto is the wife of then Senator Ralph Recto who was running for re-election as part of the pro-administration Team Unity. Since Sanchez was a member of the League of Provinces of the Philippines, governors threatened to junk the candidacy of Recto as senator.

Sanchez lost to Santos-Recto by more than 100,000 votes.

=== 2010 Elections and death ===
Sanchez, once again ran for the gubernatorial position with Edwin Ermita, who was the defeated running mate of Santos-Recto in 2007, as his running mate. Sanchez was rushed to the Mary Mediatrix Medical Center in Lipa City on April 26, 2010, after collapsing during a campaign and was placed inside an intensive care unit. Sanchez suffered a stroke due to fatigue, decreased sugar levels and severe hypertension, dying April 27, 2010. His wife, Edna, announced her bid for governorship on April 30, 2010, even though she was seeking reelection as mayor in Santo Tomas, Batangas. Six days later, she filed her Certificate of Candidacy for governor and was later permitted to run. On the election day, she lost to incumbent governor Vilma Santos, who received 59.63% of the votes. Sanchez only received 38.91% of the votes or 393,586 popular votes.

== Personal life ==
Sanchez was an engineer by profession. He was married to Edna Sanchez, the incumbent mayor of Santo Tomas, Batangas. They have four children.

He was also a founding president of Batangas Varsitarian fraternity in University of the East on 1976

Political offices
Preceded by Hermilando Mandanas	Governor of Batangas; 2004–2007	Succeeded by Vilma Santos-Recto
Preceded by Leopoldo Laurel	Mayor of Santo Tomas, Batangas; 1998–2004	Succeeded by Edna Sanchez
