= Melinda Magsino =

Filipino investigative journalist

Melinda "Mei" Magsino
- Born: January 8, 1975
- Died: April 13, 2015 (aged 40); Batangas City, Providence of Batangas, Philippines
- Cause of death: Shooting
- Education: Sta. Teresa College
- Occupations: Investigative journalist, editor and publisher
- Employer: Philippine Daily Inquirer
- Known for: Political exposés
- Spouse: Arnold Lubis
- Partner: Benjamin Reyes

Melinda "Mei" Magsino, (January 8, 1975 – 13 April 2015), was a former Filipino investigative journalist for the Philippine Daily Inquirer, was known particularly for political and corruption exposés about Batangas City committed by the Dimacuha clan and Batangas province governments, Philippines. Her life had already been threatened once before in 2005. She also received threats before her murder in 2015.

== Personal ==
Melinda Magsino was the daughter of a Philippine Army Colonel Danilo Magsino and Amelita, and came from a large family of six sisters and a brother. She attended high school at Sta. Teresa College in Batangas. At the time of her murder, she had been the partner of Benjamin "Benjie" Reyes for three years. She had resided in Batangas City, where she worked as a political journalist, and was buried April 19, 2015.

== Career ==
Melinda Magsino worked as a Philippine Daily Inquirer correspondent until 2005. She was forced to leave PDI after an internal committee looked into allegations against her, including questionable ties to businesses and sources and competitor recruiting.

During her six-year career with the Philippine Daily Inquirer, she exposed corruption within the Batangas City government, specifically that of late Batangas Governor Armando Sanchez. In 2005, Magsino exposed illegal gambling activities and called him a "jueteng lord" (gambling lord). In August 2005, Magsino resigned from the PDI and went into hiding after learning two convicted murderers had the intent of killing her.

She once provided a voice over for a documentary on TV5. After 2005, she wrote for Philippine Center for Investigative Journalism and after 2008, the Vera Files. In 2010, Magsino was the publisher, editor-in-chief, and reporter for the online news outlet Southern Luzon Inquirer.

After leaving journalism, Magsino emerged from hiding and posted on her Facebook that she had worked as the Search Engine Optimization specialist and also worked at her partner's chiropractic clinic. She still made political comments as administrator of the Facebook group "Taga Bauan, Batangas Ka Kung…".

== Death ==
Batangas City, Philippines is shown here relative to the capital city of Manila.

Before Magsino was killed, she posted on her Facebook that she received death threats and was harassed.

Magsino was shot by two gunmen riding a motorcycle on April 13, 2015, at age 40. The shooting occurred at noon right outside of the apartment Magsino shared with Benjamin Reyes in Barangay, Balagtas, Batangas. The two suspects allegedly waited outside of the apartment for Magsino, with men in a van serving as backup. Magsino was shot close up in the back of the neck with a .45 caliber with the bullet's exit out of her left eye, and she died immediately. Security video caught the killers in the act.

== Investigation ==
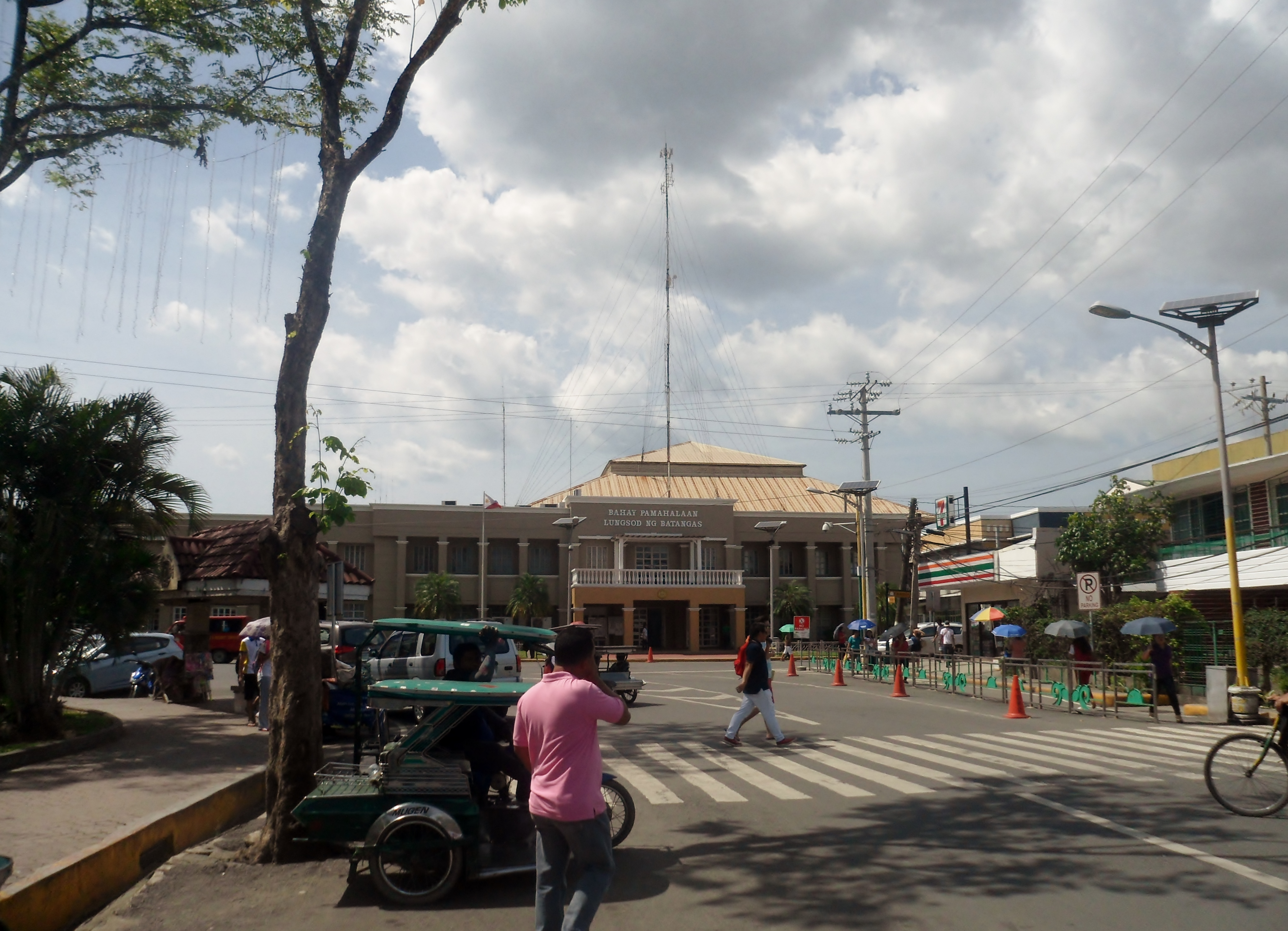
The Batangas City Hall in the background.

Motives remain unknown with several speculations. The family claims the motive for the murder was Magsino's controversial political exposé on the Batangas government. Partner Benjie Reyes told GMA News Online that Magsino was working on several possible stories before she died but did not disclose details. The topics of those stories remain unconfirmed. Eddie B. Dimacuha, the mayor of Batangas denied involvement in Magsino's killing despite allegations. The NBI of Philippines, however, also were investigating a love triangle, but that motive was dismissed.

On April 18, Magsino's father said the NBI had a suspect, but the family wanted to leave it up to the officials to handle the case details.

As of May 8, 2015, the NBI was still looking for men in a maroon van at the crime scene. Two items of video evidence held by the NBI could aid in identifying both the gunmen and their accomplices in the van. The NBI also holds Magsino's computer and cell phone.

In a most recent twist in the pursuit to arrest her murderer, Edgardo Paredes Luib one of Batangas PNP Top 10 Most Wanted, was arrested on Tuesday, March 5, at the house of his live-in partner in Santo Tomas, Batangas. Albayalde said Luib, who has a standing arrest warrant for two counts of murder, was identified through the help of a tipster, who provided the police information on February 4. Albayalde said Luib also admitted his involvement in the killing of Sytin on the evening of November 28 outside the Lighthouse Resort and Hotel in Subic Zambales. Sytin's driver was injured during the incident.

On August 8 page A19 of the Philippine Daily Inquirer, former Bauan mayor Ryanh Dolor was named the sole suspect linked to the murder of Mei Magsino. The news came on the day that he was invited to Camp Crame when President Duterte identified him as a drug lord and to shed light in his involvement in the illicit drug trade in Batangas Province. As of this date he is the only public official in Batangas identified.

== Context ==
In the Philippines, out of 129 journalists that have been killed since 1992, 52 of those, including Magsino's, have unconfirmed motives. Under President Benigno Aquino III's administration, she was the 32nd journalist to have been killed and 173rd journalist since 1986.

After Magsino's death, five Batangas cops were removed from their positions due to their failure to prevent the murder.

== Impact ==
Magsino won an award within the PDI for the co-written story "Swiss government probes $2-M Nani account," which was co-written with Clarissa Batino. Magsino used unnamed officials' disclosure of the government's investigation of Justice Secretary Hernando Perez for money laundering.

== Reactions ==
Vice President Jejomar Binay said, "There are no words strong enough to convey my disgust with the continued killings of our journalists. The press is a key institution in a democratic society and the protection of all media practitioners is a responsibility of the State and one that should be given priority."

The National Union of Journalists of the Philippines said, "Mei's murder not only highlights the fact that leaving journalism is no guarantee of safety from the perils of the profession – especially not from those with long memories and deadly intent – it also underscores the depths to which the culture of impunity has become entrenched in our country and society, courtesy of a government that has shown only the most cursory regard for human rights."

Jane Worthington, Asia Pacific acting director International Federation of Journalists, said, "The IFJ offer its condolences to the family and colleagues of Melinda (Magsino) who was murdered in cold blood. This senseless murder highlights the challenges facing journalists across the Philippines."

Inquirer publisher Raul Pangalangan said, "It falls upon us to make sure that indeed (Magsino's) death doesn't become just another statistic."

Partner Benjie Reyes said, "We just wanna see justice done. We wanna get these people (the perpetrators) off the streets because if not, they will keep repeating what they do."

In an email to Rappler responding to Magsino's death, media ethicist Luis Teodoro wrote, "Any journalist killed diminishes the number of voices necessary in democratic discourse. The possibility of (journalism) being abused is part of the risks of free expression. The abuse of press freedom can and should be addressed through self regulation."

== See also ==
- Human rights in the Philippines
- List of journalists killed under the Arroyo administration
