= Hermilando Mandanas =

Filipino politician

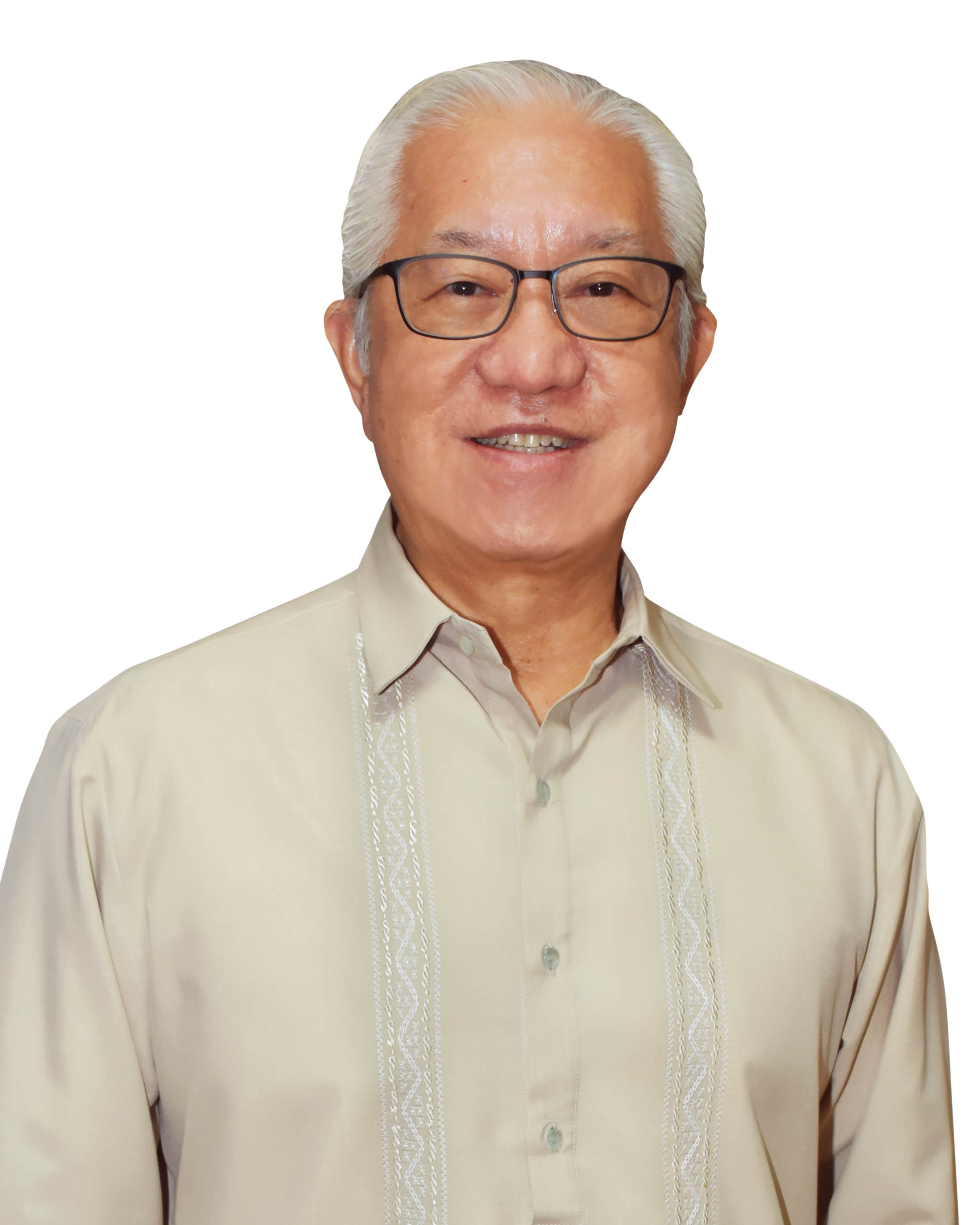
- Official Portrait, 2016

16th Vice Governor of Batangas
- Incumbent
- Assumed office June 30, 2025
- Governor: Vilma Santos-Recto
- Preceded by: Mark Leviste

National Chairman of the League of Vice Governors of the Philippines
- Incumbent
- Assumed office July 18, 2025
- President: Ma. Christina M. Garcia
- Preceded by: Reynaldo M. Quimpo

21st and 24th Governor of Batangas
- In office June 30, 2016 – June 30, 2025
- Vice Governor: Sofronio Ona, Jr. (2016–2019); Mark Leviste (2019–2025)
- Preceded by: Vilma Santos-Recto
- Succeeded by: Vilma Santos-Recto
- In office June 30, 1995 – June 30, 2004
- Vice Governor: Richard Recto (1995–2001); Peter Laurel (2001–2004)
- Preceded by: Vicente Mayo
- Succeeded by: Arman Sanchez

Member of the Philippine House of Representatives from the Batangas's 2nd congressional district
- In office June 30, 2004 – June 30, 2013
- Preceded by: Francisco S. Perez II
- Succeeded by: Raneo Abu

Personal details
- Born: Hermilando Ingco Mandanas; March 25, 1944 (age 82) Bauan, Batangas, Philippine Commonwealth
- Party: PDP (2017–present)
- Other political affiliations: UNA (2013–2017); Liberal (2003–2013); Lakas (1992–2001; 2001–2003); Reporma (2001)
- Spouse(s): Regina Ongsiako Reyes (d. 2022) Angelica Chua (m. 2024)
- Education: De La Salle College (BS); University of the Philippines Diliman (MBA)
- Profession: Politician
- Nickname: Dodo

Hermilando "Dodo" Ingco Mandanas (born March 25, 1944) is a Filipino politician who has served as vice governor of Batangas since 2025. Mandanas previously served as governor from 1995 to 2004 and from 2016 to 2025. He served as a member of the House of Representatives of the Philippines, representing the second district of Batangas from 2004 until 2013.

== Early life and education ==
Hermilando Ingco Mandanas was born on March 25, 1944, in Bauan, Batangas. His parents were Ernesto Ylagan Mandanas and Azucena Garcia Ingco.

He studied at Bauan Aplaya Elementary School from 1949-1955 and finished High School at St. Bridget College from 1955 to 1959. He finished his Bachelor of Science in Commerce degree as a consistent dean's lister – first honor at De La Salle College in 1963. He then became a university scholar at the University of the Philippines and studied for his master's degree in business administration, where he graduated honor roll in 1969. He obtained his honorary degree (honoris causa) as doctorate in humanities at Batangas State University.

He also served as chairman of Department of Accountancy (1968–1969), associate dean of School of Commerce (1967–1969) and a member of the board of trustees (1979–1985) in the De La Salle University.

== Career ==
=== Private sector ===
Mandanas started out by working for different companies. He was a supervisor of the Carlos J. Valdes & Co. from 1963 to 1965. He then served as an executive assistant to the president of the Far East Bank and Trust Company. In 1972, he was the president of the Fereit Realty Development Corporation until 1975 and as the Philippine Commercial Delegate of the Banque Francaise Du Commerce Exterior from 1975 to 1978. Then he became the managing director of the Manila & Hong Kong Capital Corporation from 1980 until 1987.

He also served as the director for: Alpa Asia Hotels & Resorts Incorporated; United States Capital Corporation; Philippines-China Development Corporation; Oriental Pacific Equities (Hong Kong); Manila Taiwan Development Corporation; Apex Mining and Exploration Company and Rural Bank of Batangas.

From 1987 to circa 1995, he also was the chairperson and president of the: Omnivest; Hedge Issues Management; Abacus Consolidated Holdings; Suricon Resources Corp.; and HIM Management Corp.

=== Government sector ===
After the issuance of the Presidential Decree No. 1396, Mandanas served as the first general manager of the Human Settlements Development Corporation under then-president Ferdinand Marcos.

From 1995 to 2004, he served as Governor of Batangas and concurrently president of the Federation of Regional Development Council of the Philippines. He also served as chairman of the Regional Development Council (Region IV-A, Southern Tagalog) from 1995 to 2004, the Regional Peace and Order Council (Region IV-A) from 1995 to 2001 and from 2003 to 2004, and Calabarzon Coordinating Council from 2001 to 2004.

From 2004 to 2013, he served as the representative for 2nd district of Batangas, holding positions such as former chairman of the Ways and Means Committee, vice-chairperson for Economic Affairs, and member for the majority in various committees including Banks and Financial Intermediaries, Bases Conversion, East ASEAN Growth Area, Energy, Foreign Affairs, Globalization and WTO, Government Enterprises and Privatization, Millennium Development Goals, National Defense and Security, and Trade and Industry. Additionally, he chaired Congressional Oversight Committees overseeing the Comprehensive Tax Reform Program, Physical Examination of Imported Articles, and Official Development Assistance, and was a member of the Safeguard Measures Act committee. During his tenure, he and Bataan Governor Enrique Garcia Jr. petitioned the Supreme Court of the Philippines for a higher share of national internal revenue taxes for local government units, leading to the Mandanas-Garcia Ruling, named after them.

In 2016, he was reelected to his second stint as Governor of Batangas. After being elected for a third and final time in 2022, Mandanas was elected vice governor of Batangas in the 2025 Philippine general election.

As governor, Mandanas supported the expansion of natural gas power plants in Batangas.

== Personal life ==
Mandanas's first wife was Regina Reyes Mandanas, daughter of former Bureau of Immigration commissioner Edmundo Reyes Sr. and Marinduque governor Carmencita O. Reyes, until her death on May 5, 2022 due to sepsis.

On May 8, 2024, Mandanas married his second wife, lawyer Angelica Chua, who is a native of Ibaan and 48 years his junior. The wedding took place at the Basilica of the Immaculate Conception in Batangas City, following earlier reports that the couple began dating earlier in the year.

== Awards and citations ==
- The Pontifical Equestrian Order of Saint Sylvester, Pope Leo XIV, June 29, 2025
- Philconsa's Medal of Wisdom and Courage Awardee, Phil. Constitution Association, February 8, 2012 (Constitution Day)
- 2006 Dangal Ng Pilipinas Awardee, Consumers Union of the Philippines
- 2005 Regional Kabalikat Awardee, Technical Education & Skills Development Authority
- 2004, 2005, 2006, 2007, 2008, 2009, Most Outstanding Congressman, Makati Graduate School, Congress Magazine, MV Gallego Foundation
- 2004 Outstanding Public Official, Consumer's Union of the Philippines, 15th Annual National Consumers Award
- Outstanding Governor Award, 2nd Local Government Leadership Award, Senate, Republic of the Philippines, 2002 and 2003
- Gawad Parangal Awardee, Most Outstanding Provincial Governor, 7th National Social Welfare and Development Forum, October 2003
- 2002 Provincial Nutrition Green Banner Awardee, In the Calabarzon Region, National Nutrition Council, September 2003
- Most outstanding Governor of the Philippines, Awarded by PNP Maritime, 2002
- Kabalikat Awards 2000, Tesda
- Most Outstanding Governor of Calabarzon, Leader Magazine, July 9, 2000

Political offices
Preceded by Vilma Santos-Recto	Governor of Batangas; 2016–2025	Succeeded by Vilma Santos-Recto
Preceded by Vicente Mayo	Governor of Batangas; 1995–2004	Succeeded by Armando C. Sanchez
House of Representatives of the Philippines
Preceded by Francisco S. Perez II	Member of the House of Representatives from Batangas's 2nd district 2004–2013	Succeeded by Raneo Abu
