= Pasay =

Highly urbanized city in Metro Manila, Philippines

- Highly urbanized city
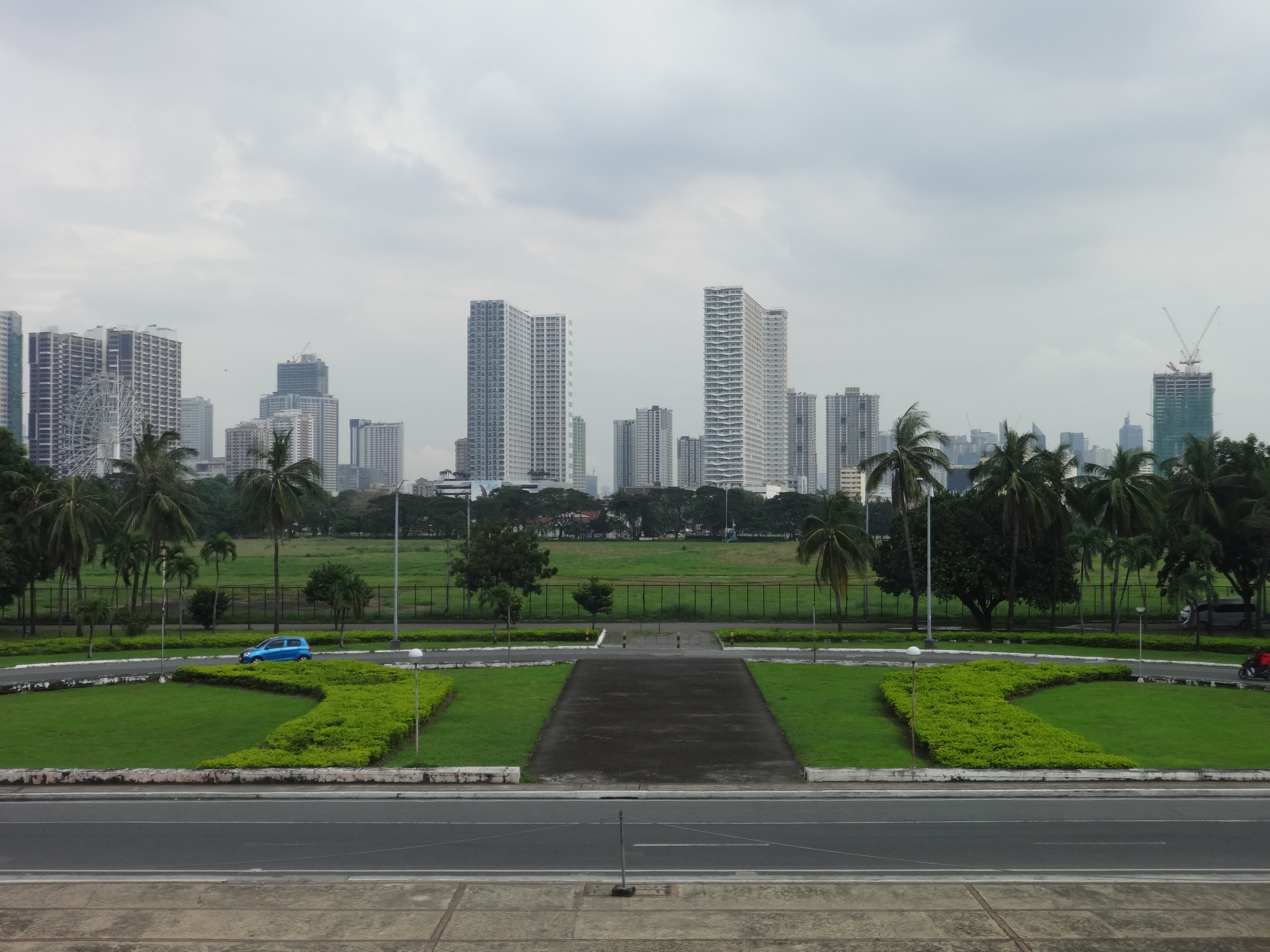
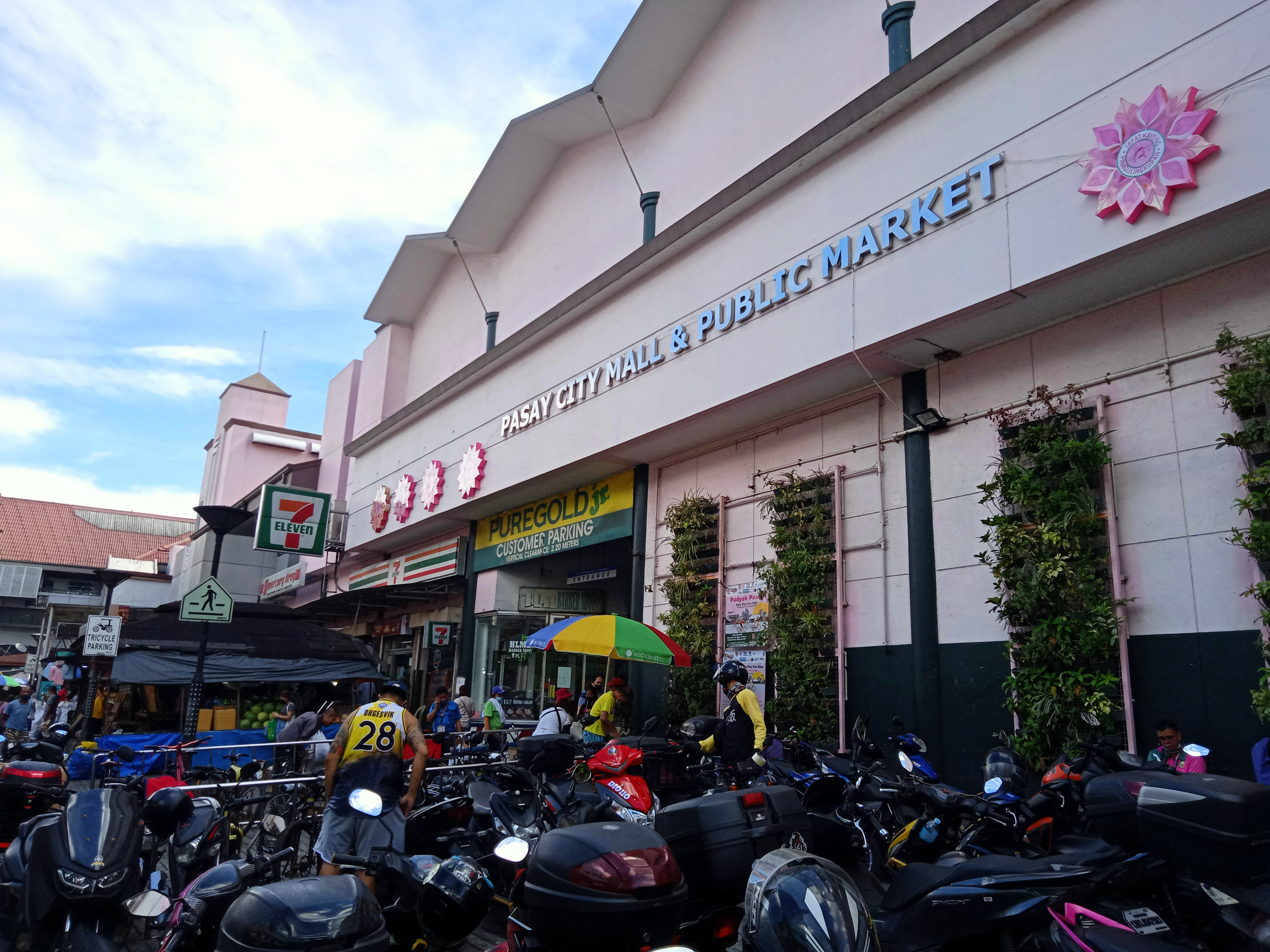
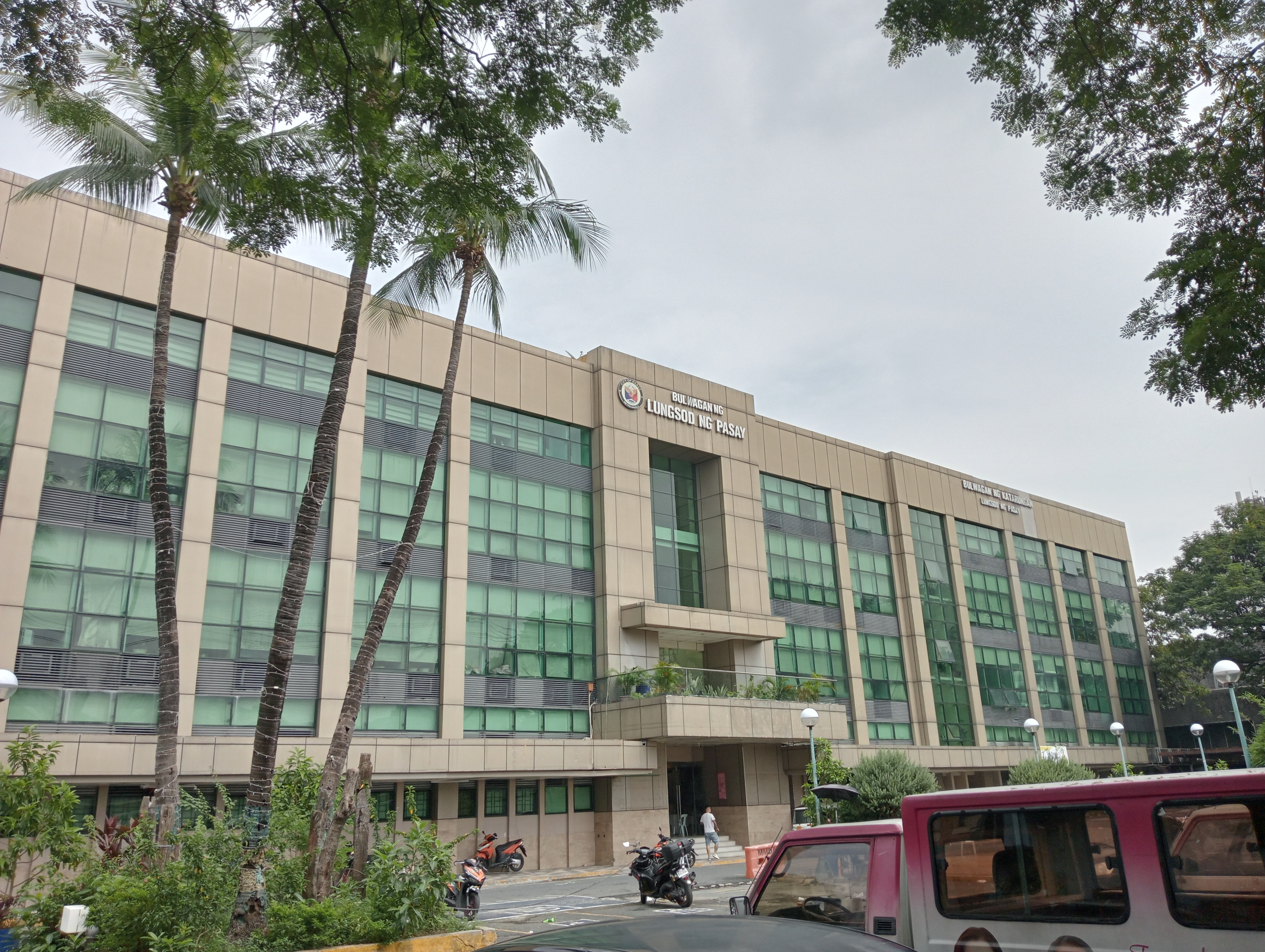
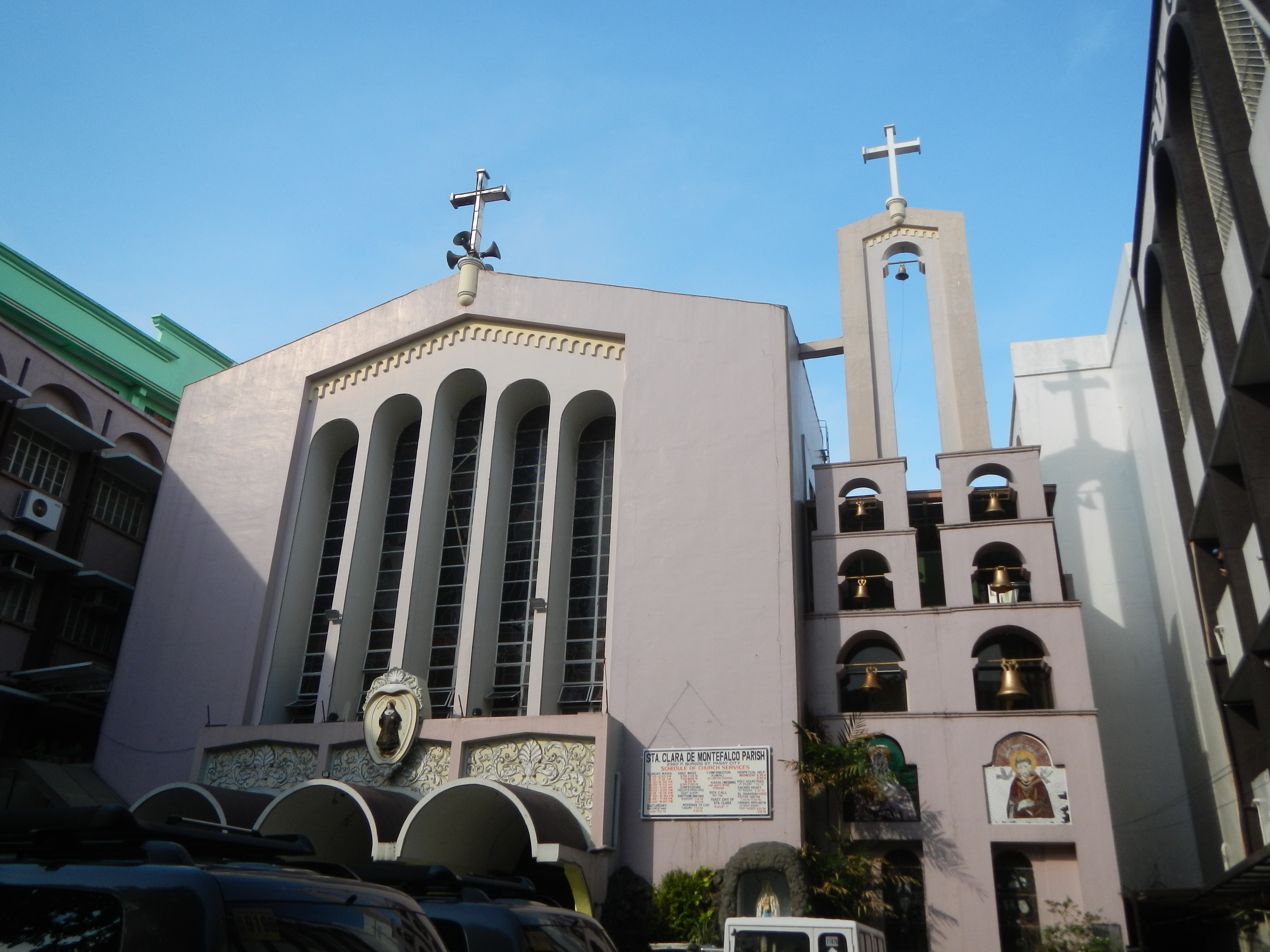
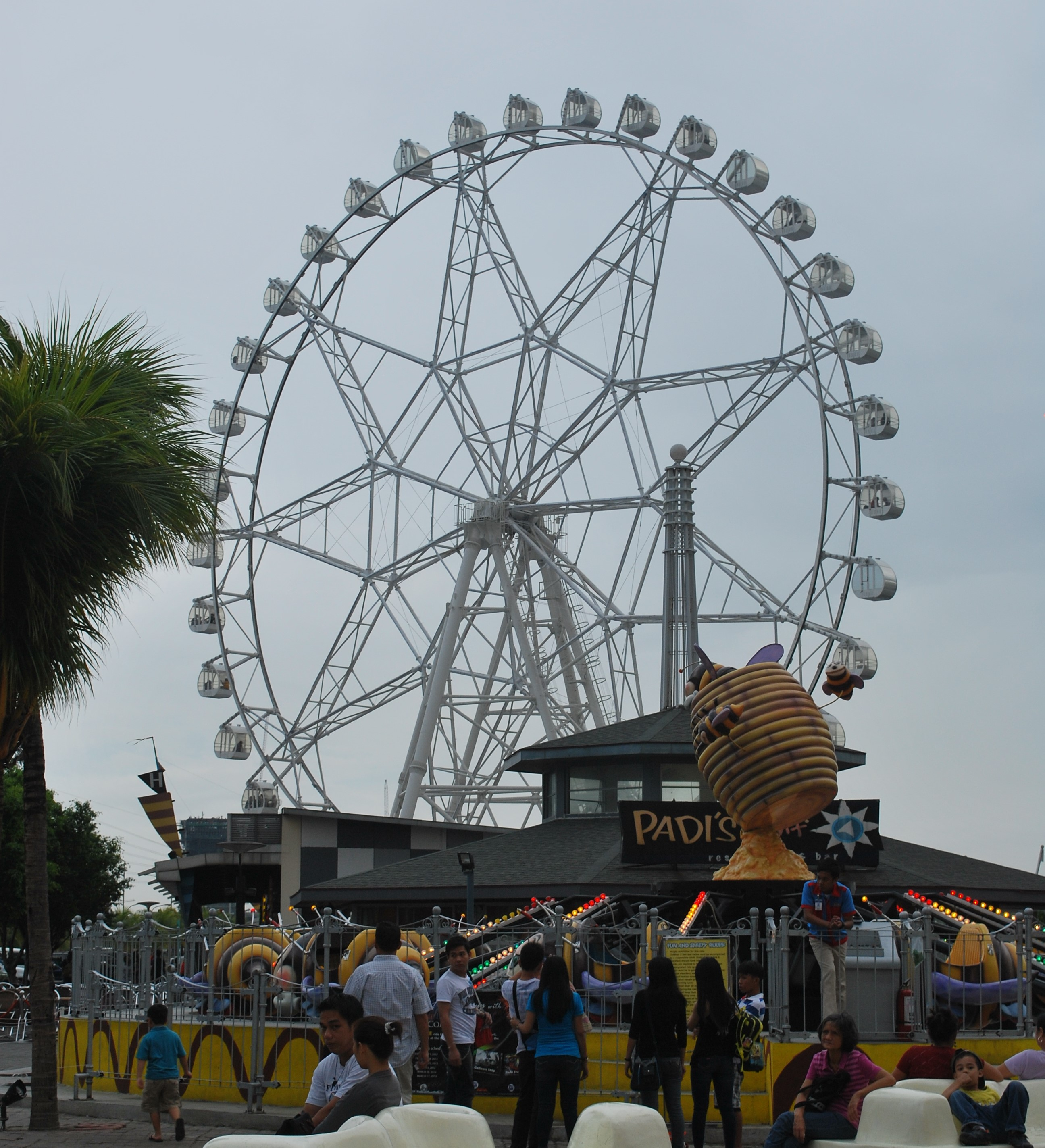
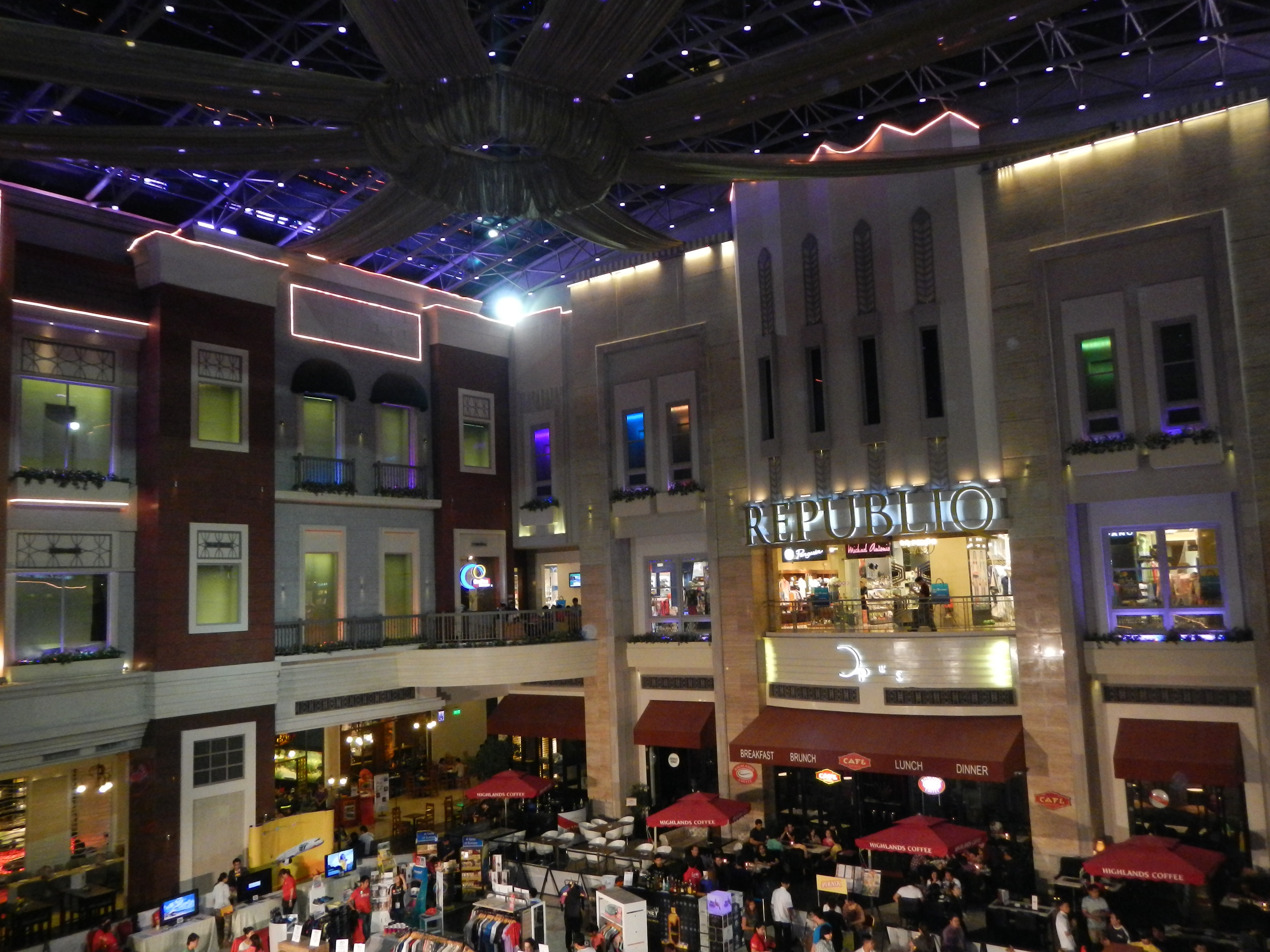
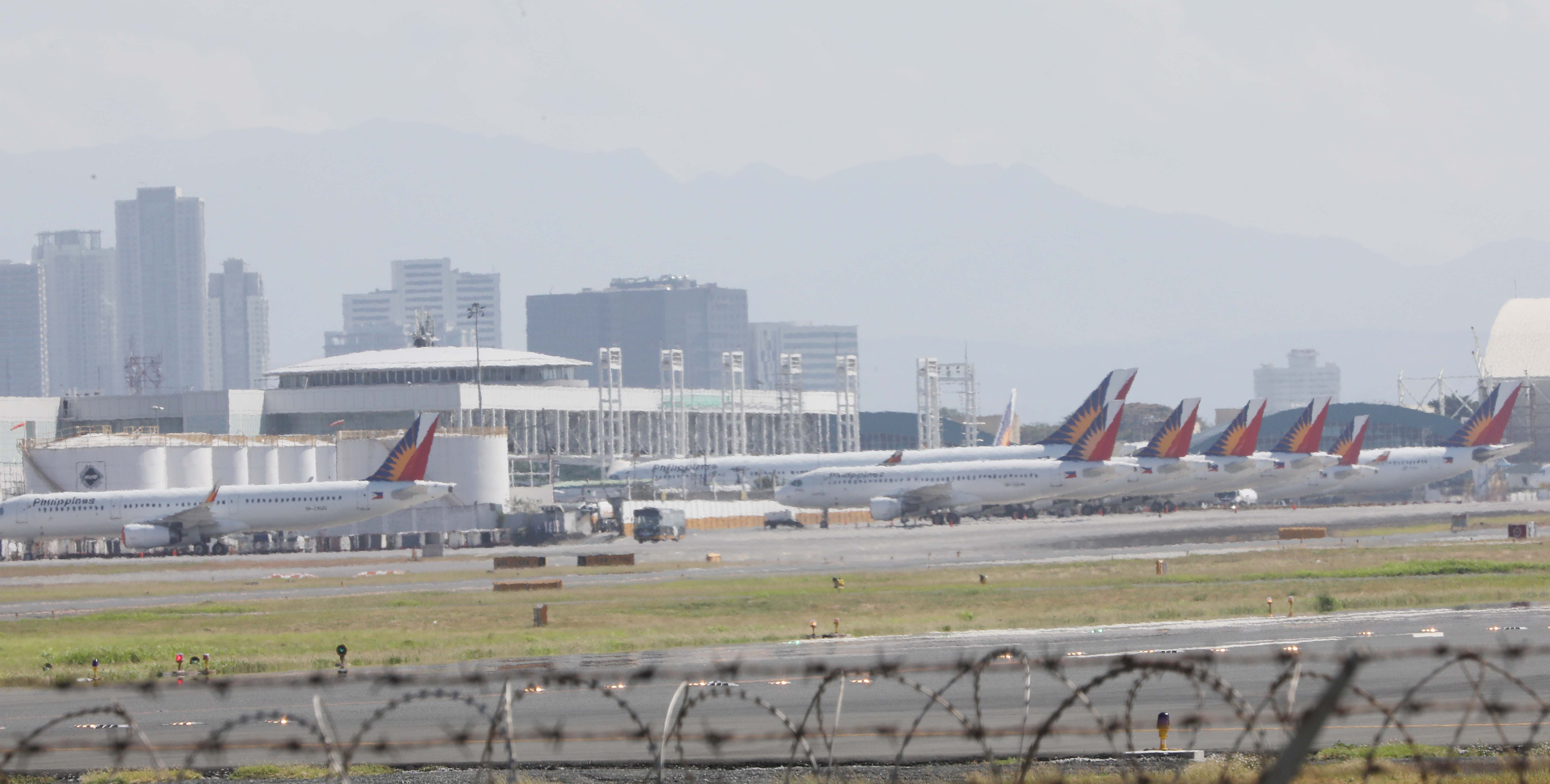
- Pasay skyline Pasay City Mall and Market Pasay City Hall Sta. Clara de Montefalco Parish MOA Eye Star City Newport Mall NAIA Terminal 2

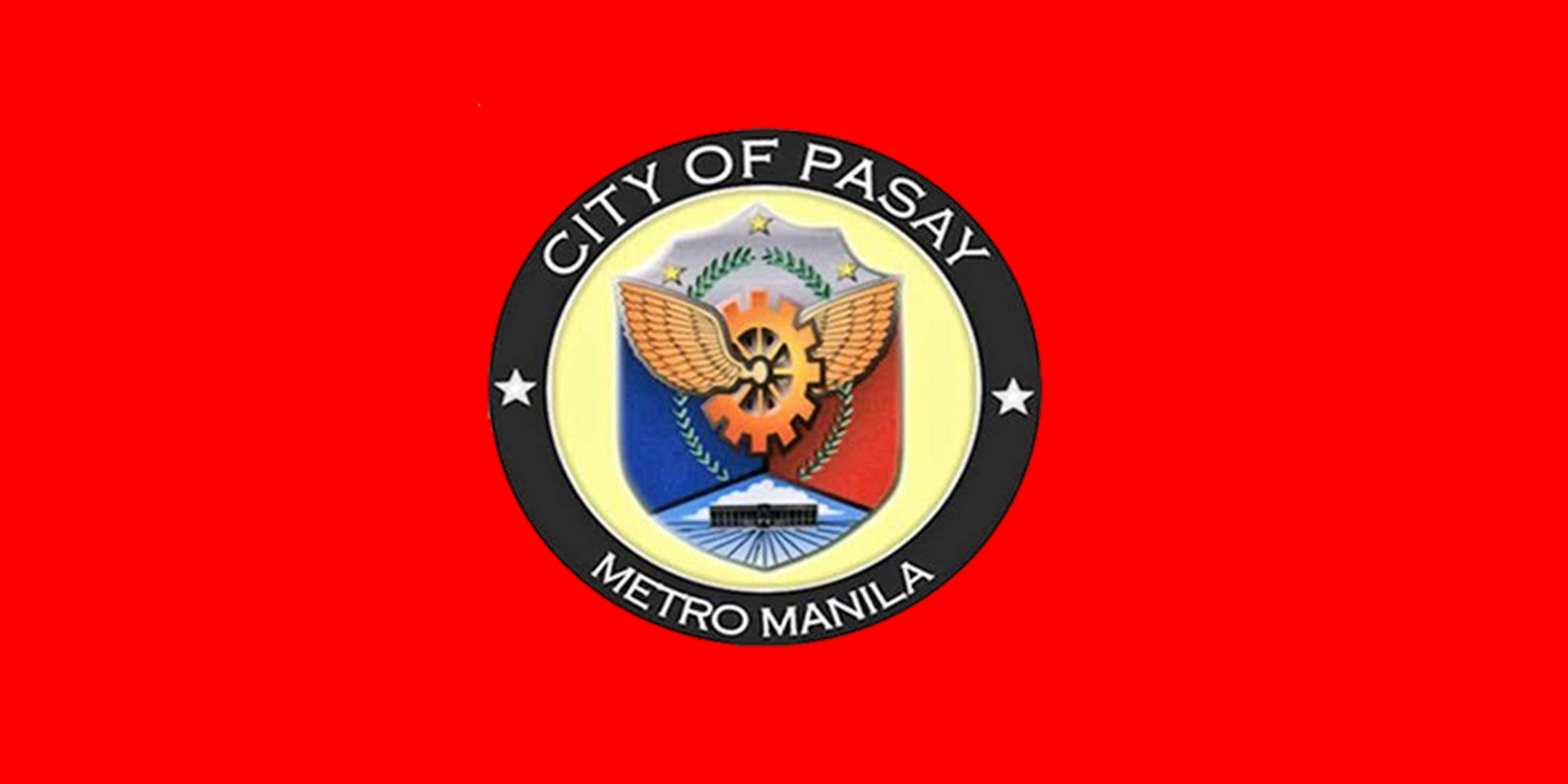
- Flag Seal
- Nickname(s): The Travel City, The Gateway to the Philippine Islands
- Motto: Aim High Pasay!
- Anthem: Pasay, Mabuhay Ka! (English: "Long live Pasay!")
- Map of Metro Manila with Pasay highlighted
- Interactive map of Pasay
- Location within the Philippines
- Coordinates: 14°32′38″N 120°59′42″E
- Country: Philippines
- Region: Metro Manila
- Province: none
- District: Lone district
- Founded: December 2, 1863
- Renamed: September 6, 1901; June 7, 1950
- Cityhood and renamed: June 21, 1947 (as Rizal City)
- Highly urbanized city: December 22, 1979
- Barangays: 201 (see Barangays)

Government
  - Type: Sangguniang Panlungsod
  - Mayor: Emi Calixto Rubiano (PFP)
  - Vice Mayor: Mark Anthony A. Calixto (Lakas)
  - Representative: Antonino G. Calixto (Lakas)
  - Councilors: 1st District: Mark Anthony Calixto; Mary Grace Santos; Marlon Pesebre; Ma. Antonia Cuneta; Abraham Albert Alvina; Ricardo Santos; 2nd District: Jose Isidro Jr.; Editha Manguerra; Donnabel Vendivel; Jennifer Panaligan; King Marlon Magat; Angelo Nicol Arceo
  - Electorate: 292,695 voters (2025)

Area
  - Total: 13.97 km^{2} (5.39 sq mi)
- Elevation: 21 m (69 ft)
- Highest elevation: 449 m (1,473 ft)
- Lowest elevation: 0 m (0 ft)

Population (2024 census)
  - Total: 453,186
  - Density: 32,440/km^{2} (84,020/sq mi)
  - Households: 127,629
- Demonym: Pasayeño

Economy
  - Income class: 1st city income class
  - Poverty incidence: 0.7% (2023)
  - Revenue: ₱ 9,581 million (2024)
  - Assets: ₱ 20,271 million (2024)
  - Expenditure: ₱ 8,237 million (2024)
  - Liabilities: ₱ 8,979 million (2024)

Service provider
  - Electricity: Manila Electric Company (Meralco)
- Time zone: UTC+8 (PST)
- PSGC: 137605000
- IDD : area code: +63 (0)2
- Native languages: Filipino
- Website: www.pasay.gov.ph

Pasay, officially the City of Pasay (Filipino: Lungsod ng Pasay; IPA: [ˈpaː.saɪ̯]), is a highly urbanized city in the National Capital Region of the Philippines. According to the 2024 census, it has a population of 453,186 people.

Due to its location just south of Manila, Pasay quickly became an urban town during the American colonial period. It is now best known for being the site of most of Ninoy Aquino International Airport and of complexes such as Newport City and the SM Central Business Park.

== Etymology ==
There are several explanations as to the city's name:

- A legend suggests it may have been named after Dayang-dayang Pasay, a princess of the Kingdom of Namayan and daughter of Rajah Sulayman of the Kingdom of Maynila. She had inherited half her father's dominion, which encompasses the present city, which she donated to Spanish friars at her deathbed.
- Another legend suggests the namesake Pasay was instead a prince, whose father was Lakan Tagkan of Namayan. He inherited territories that included the area of the city.
- A romantic tale has a man named José loudly wailing "¡Paz-ay!" at the grave of his wealthy lover, Paz. She had died from loneliness after their love was forbidden, and in her memory her parents named their hacienda Paz-ay, later spelt Pasay.
- Some historians believe the city is named for the medicinal plant pasaw (Pseuderanthemum reticulatum), a flowering shrub once abundant there.
- According to American historian Austin Craig, Pasay was known as Javan Pasar, a corruption of the Arabic word bazar as the town was a marketplace.
- In the colonial era, Pasay was spelt as Pasai, supposedly after the historical sultanate in the modern province of Aceh, on Sumatra, Indonesia.

== History ==
=== Early history ===
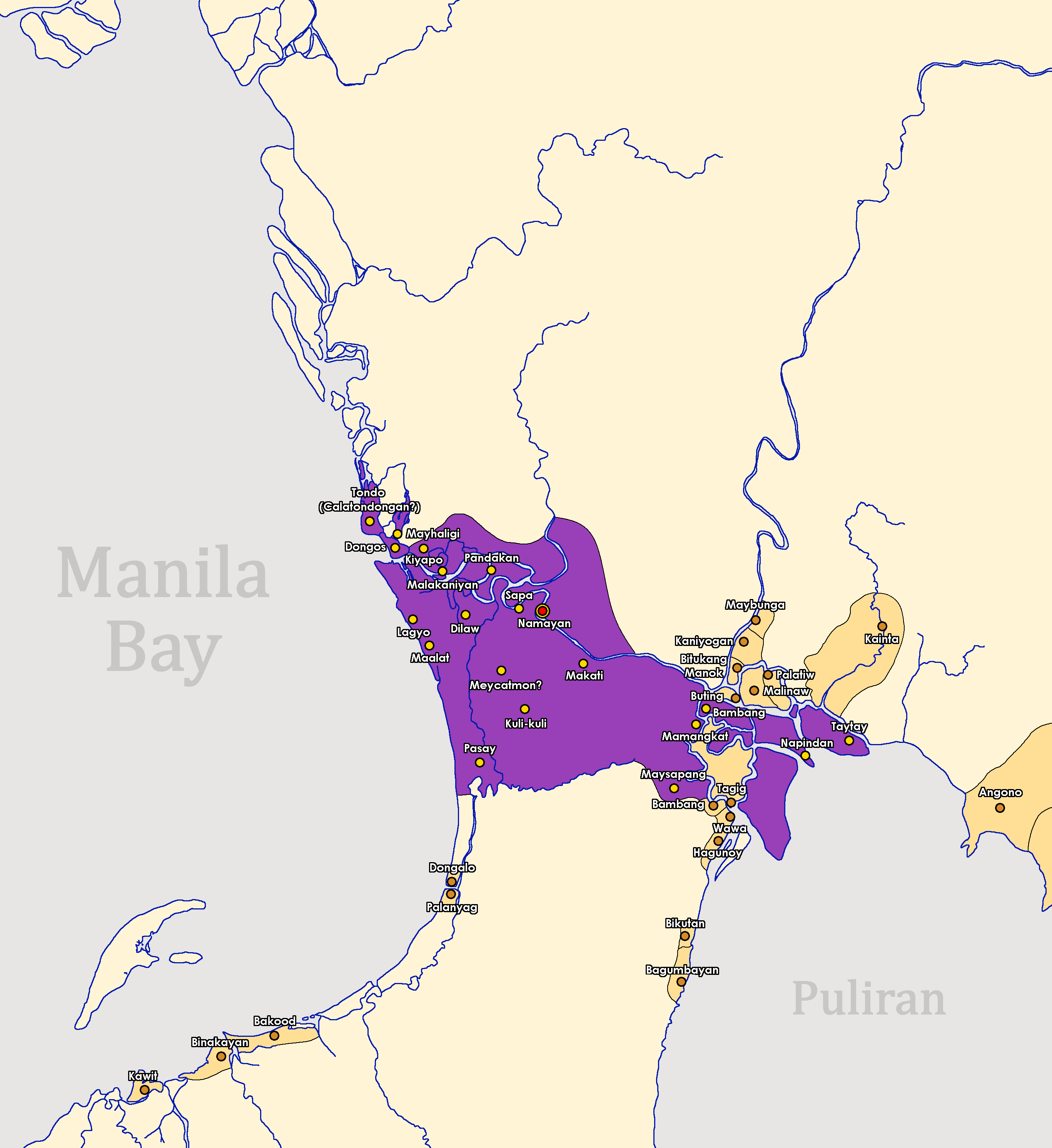
Map of Namayan (colored pink) in 1470 under the rule of Lakan Tagkan. Pasay is shown as a part of Namayan, which was gifted to Tagkan's illegitimate son Pasay.

In local folk history about the period before the arrival of Spanish colonizers, Pasay is said to have been part of Namayan (also called Sapa), a confederation of barangays which supposedly controlled territory stretching from Manila Bay to Laguna de Bay, and which, upon the arrival of the Spanish, eventually became known as Santa Ana de Sapa (now Santa Ana, Manila).

=== Spanish colonial period ===
On May 19, 1571, Miguel López de Legazpi took formal possession of the Rajahnate of Maynila and its surrounding polities in the name of the Spanish crown.

Of the many religious orders that came, it was the Augustinian Order who would figure predominantly in the evangelisation of Pasay. Having control over Pasay, they converted the area into an extensive agricultural estate known as the Hacienda de Meysapan. The parish of Pasay was governed from the old Namayan capital, since renamed Santa Ana de Sapa, which was under the jurisdiction of the Franciscans. The promise of space in Heaven prompted early native converts to donate their possessions to the Church, with folklore recounting how a baptized Pasay on her deathbed donated her vast estate to the Augustinians. Most of Pasay went to friar's hands either via donation or by purchase; many natives were also forced to divest of their properties to cope with stringent colonial impositions.

In 1727, the Augustinians formally took over Pasay and transferred it from Santa Ana de Sapa to Malate, particularly under the jurisdiction of the Parish of Nuestra Señora de los Remedios. A unique parish for having churches and buildings designed in combinations of Mexican Baroque and Filipino Mudejar (Christianized Islamic Art). The Philippines holds the only distinction in Asia of being the sole repositories of Latin American culture in an Asian setting. In 1815, Pasay was separated from Malate. In 1862, notable residents of Pasay submitted a petition to handle their political and religious matters independently, proposing to rename the town "Pineda", in honor of Don Cornelio Pineda, a Spanish horticulturist who was their benefactor. On December 2, 1863, with the recommendation of Archbishop of Manila Gregorio Melitón Martínez Santa Cruz, Pineda was granted its own municipal charter, and this date is celebrated yearly as the city's official foundation day.

=== Philippine revolutionary period ===
Pasay produced numerous heroes during the Philippine Revolution. The Katipunan, the organization founded by Andrés Bonifacio that spearheaded the revolution, had a chapter in Pineda organized by Pascual Villanueva, Jacinto Ignacio, and Valentín Ignacio. Several women also fought for the cause of the Katipunan including Marcela Marcelo. The execution of José Rizal, who authored the novels Noli Me Tángere and El Filibusterismo (considered seditious by the colonial government) on December 30, 1896, fanned the flames of the Revolution.

=== American colonial period ===
General Emilio Aguinaldo meanwhile declared the independence of the First Philippine Republic on June 12, 1898, and issued decrees providing political reorganization in the country. With this, Don Catalino became Pasay's first Presidente municipal (equivalent to a mayor).

Pineda was made the command outpost of the Primera Zona de Manila under Gen. Mariano Noriel, but Gen. Wesley Merritt appealed that the Pineda outpost turned over to the Americans so that they could be closer to the Spanish lines. Thinking Americans were allies, Noriel left Pineda on July 29, allowing American General Greene to transfer. When Intramuros was finally captured, the Filipinos were denied entry to the walled city. Since then, tension simmered between Filipino and American troops, with both sides assigned respective zones but neither observed boundary lines. On the night of February 4, 1899, four Filipinos crossed the American line in Santa Mesa, Manila, and shots were exchanged, triggering the Philippine–American War.

On May 19, 1899, General Noriel was given command again of Pineda. In June, Noriel together with General Ricarte almost defeated the American forces had they exploited the exhaustion of the enemy in the Battle of Las Piñas. Instead, their forces were attacked by American reinforcements and bombarded by warships. The assault forced them to abandon Pineda to occupation by American forces.

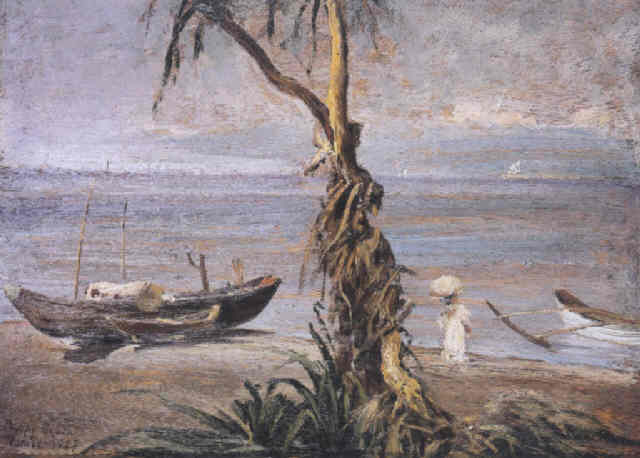
Pasay beach, Manila, oil on board by Fabián de la Rosa, 1927

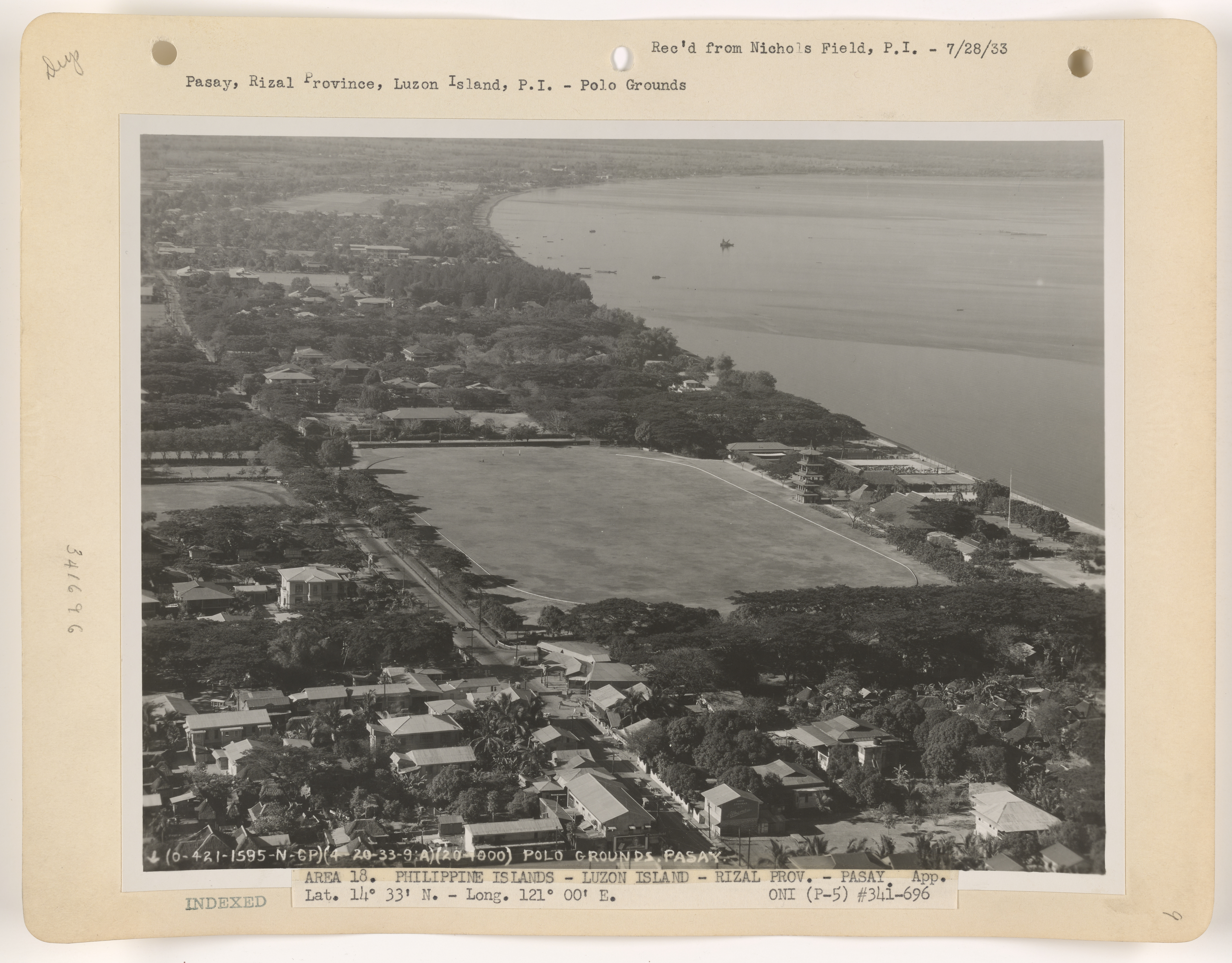
Aerial view of Pasay, circa 1930s

On June 11, 1901, Pineda was incorporated into the Province of Rizal. Pascual Villanueva was appointed as municipal president. On August 4, 1901, the Pineda municipal council passed a resolution petitioning that the original name of Pasay be restored. On September 6, 1901, the Philippine Commission, acting on the request of the townsfolk, passed Act No. 227 renaming Pineda back to Pasay. Two years later, on October 12, 1903, Act No. 942 merged Pasay with the municipality of Malibay to the south, expanding its territory. With a population of 8,100 in 1903, Pasay was placed under the fourth-class category together with nine other municipalities.

Friar lands, then nationalized, were turned into subdivisions. Soon, the Pasay Real Estate Company offered friar lands as residential lots for sale or for lease to foreign investors. Postal, telegraph, and telephone lines were installed, and branches of Philippine Savings Bank were established. In 1907, a first-class road from Pasay to Camp Nichols in the east was completed. Others were repaired including the old Avenida México (now Taft Avenue Extension). Transportation services improved. Among the first buses plying routes to Pasay were Pasay Transportation, Raymundo Transportation, Try-tran, and Halili Transit.

By 1908, Meralco tranvía (electric tram car) lines linked Pasay to Intramuros, Escolta, San Miguel, San Sebastián, and San Juan. Automobiles took to the streets, testing their maximum 20 km/h (12 mph) speed on Taft Avenue. On April 11, 1914, Cora Wong, a nurse at Chinese General Hospital, became the first woman in the Philippines to fly as a passenger on a flight with Tom Gunn in a Curtiss seaplane off Pasay Beach.

Pasay eventually became a suburban area of Manila during the American occupation. From a population of 6,542 residents, the town had a population of 18,697 by 1918, where 163 of them were Americans. Pasay was developed to be a residential area for prominent Filipino families and Americans, including future President of the Commonwealth Manuel L. Quezon. By the 1930s, the former rural town had become a suburb of the capital city.

From the 1900s up to the mid-1930s, Philippine National Railway services reached Pasay through its Cavite Line.

=== Japanese occupation ===
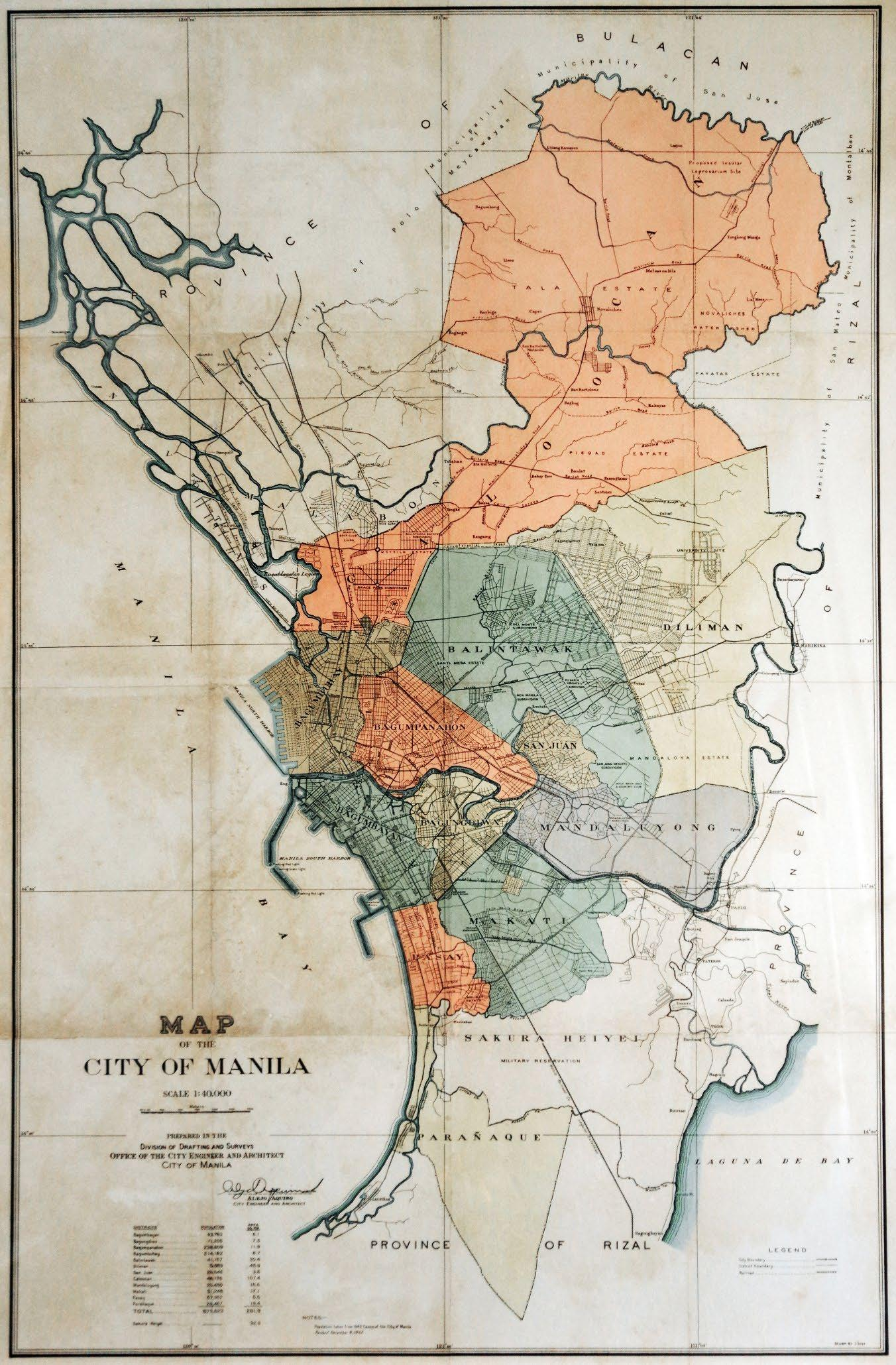
Map of the City of Greater Manila in 1942, depicting the northern part of present-day Pasay included, while the southern portion is under the Sakura Heiyei military reservation.

World War II came and on December 26, 1941, General Douglas MacArthur issued a proclamation declaring Manila and its suburbs (Caloocan, Quezon City, San Juan, Mandaluyong, Makati, and Pasay) an open city. On New Year's Day 1942, Quezon, while in Corregidor, established the City of Greater Manila, wherein Pasay, along with other nearby towns of Rizal, was merged with Manila and Quezon City. He called his secretary Jorge B. Vargas and appointed him by executive order "the Mayor of Greater Manila". The mayor of Pasay was then Rufino Mateo, who was concurrently the district chief of Pasay under the City of Greater Manila, governing a town of more than 55,161. During the WWII, many Pasayeños joined in the fight against the Japanese. José P. Maibag, born and bred in Pasay, laid out underground networking. Carlos Mendoza, a resident of Barrio San Roque, together with 14 others, formed a mobile broadcasting station called "The Voice of Juan dela Cruz." On July 11, 1942, Japanese military police captured the group. Carling Mendoza, alias Juan de la Cruz" and other members of the group were brought to the old Bilibid Prison and were tortured.

Pasay had to redo the signs all over town, with Filipino was ordered to prevail over English. The national language became a core subject in the secondary school curriculum, while Japanese was taught as well at all levels of education. On October 14, 1943, Japan proclaimed the Second Philippine Republic. In the meantime, food had become so scarce that prices soared. Pasay residents began to move away from the city to the provinces outside. The Japanese occupation forces dissolved the City of Greater Manila in 1944 with the establishment of the Philippine Executive Commission to govern occupied regions in the country, thus separating the consolidated cities and towns, with Pasay returning to the province of Rizal. In the middle of February up to early March 1945, as the combined Allied forces began to converge on the way to the Manila area northwards from the south, Pasay suffered enormous damage during the month-long Battle of Manila, and many residents perished either by the Japanese or friendly fire from the combined Filipino and American forces.

On February 27, 1945, General MacArthur turned over the government to President Sergio Osmeña. One of Osmeña's first acts was to dissolve the City of Greater Manila. He then appointed Juan Salcedo Jr., born in Pasay in 1904, as Director of Philippine Health, and then as executive officer of the Philippine Rehabilitation Administration in charge of national recovery from the devastation wrought by the Japanese occupation. Osmeña appointed Adolfo Santos as prewar vice mayor of Pasay, in place of incumbent Moises San Juan who died during the war. He also issued an executive order that would dissolve the City of Greater Manila effective August 1, 1945, thus reinstating Pasay's pre-war status as a municipality of Rizal.

=== Philippine independence ===
==== Cityhood ====
Ignacio Santos-Díaz, a congressman from the first district of Rizal, pushed for the conversion of the town into a city and it to be named after Rizal. Republic Act No. 183 was signed into law by President Manuel Roxas on June 21, 1947, officially establishing Rizal City, named after José Rizal, with Mateo Rufino as mayor and a population of 88,738. As of June 1948, the city had revenues of ₱472,835 (equivalent to ₱58,504,230 in 2021). But the residents could not get themselves to call their city by its new name. After two years, eight months, and twelve days of trying, the force of habit prevailed and Eulogio Rodríguez Jr., Santos-Díaz's successor, filed a bill returning the city to its original name. On June 7, 1950, President Elpidio Quirino, once a resident of Pasay himself, signed into law Republic Act No. 437, which changed the name of Rizal City to Pasay City.

It was also in the 1940s when houses of faith were constructed in different parts of Pasay. Among them was the Church of Our Lady of Sorrows, the Librería de San Pablo Catholic Women's League, Caritas, the nutrition center, and the grotto of Our Lady of Lourdes. In 1951, two parishes were established: the Parish of San Isidro Labrador and the Parish of San Rafael. By that time, the city was once more the aviation center of the country when what is now Ninoy Aquino International Airport opened its doors in 1948.

On June 14, 1955, Pasay regained its power to choose its leader. Pablo Cuneta ran against one-time Mayor Adolfo Santos and became the city's first elected mayor. In 1959, he campaigned again and won against his former vice mayor, Ruperto Galvez. On December 30, 1965, Ferdinand Marcos Sr was sworn in as President of the Philippines, with Fernando Lopez, a resident of Pasay, as vice president. From that moment, Imelda Romuáldez Marcos, the theme First Lady, became involved in national affairs. On the northern boundary of Pasay, she started filling the waterfront on Manila Bay to build the Cultural Center of the Philippines. In the later decades she would add three more architectural showpieces on reclaimed land in Pasay: the Folk Arts Theater, Manila Film Center, and the Philippine International Convention Center, and later on the PhilCite Exhibition Hall, the basis of what is now Star City. The city, though, was also being groomed as a television center for the country, for in 1958, ABS-CBN had opened its brand new television studios on what is now Roxas Boulevard, later handing it over in 1969 to the Radio Philippines Network, which used them until a 1973 fire which ruined the studios, as ABS-CBN had moved northward into Quezon City with the opening of its current studios and offices.

In 1967, Jovito Claudio won the city elections as chief executive against Pablo Cuneta. In the following year, an assassination attempt occurred in Pasay when a Bolivian surrealist painter lunged at Pope Paul VI, with a knife grazing his chest. In 1971, Cuneta was re-elected as city mayor of a growing city of almost 90 thousand people.

==== Martial law era ====
Before martial law was declared in 1972, two bombings in Pasay were among the incidents cited in Ferdinand Marcos's Proclamation No. 1081. The proclamation listed the bombing of the Arca Building on Taft Avenue on March 15 and the bombing of the Filipinas Orient Airways boardroom on Domestic Road on April 23, attributing these incidents to what it called “lawless elements.” A retrospective published by the Philippine Daily Inquirer describes the wider series of bombings in Metro Manila and reports that Senator Benigno Aquino Jr. questioned the government's explanation of the violence before martial law was declared.

On December 7, 1972, almost two months after martial law was declared, an assassin tried to kill Imelda Marcos in Pasay, on live television, while Mrs. Marcos was distributing prizes to the winners of the National Beautification and Cleanliness contest. She suffered some wounds and broken nails but on the whole, she emerged unscathed from that close encounter. On the second anniversary of martial law, Marcos issued Presidential Decree No. 557, declaring every barrio in the country as barangays. Not long after the decree had been put into effect, the Metropolitan Manila Commission and the Department of Local Government instructed Pasay to create its own barangays. Mayor Cuneta, in response, ordered the creation of 487 barangays. Upon the firm suggestion of Local Government and Community Development Secretary Jose Roño, the number of barangays was cut down to two hundred, organized into several zones.

On November 7, 1975, Marcos appointed the First Lady as governor of Metro Manila. The federation consolidated 13 towns and 4 cities including Pasay, which was removed from Rizal province, by virtue of Presidential Decree No. 824.

Pasay was the host city of Miss Universe 1974, the first time this event had been held in the morning and in the Asia Pacific, and thus was in the international spotlight in the leadup to the pageant day. Half a decade later, the city's first family would become famous nationally in the music scene: Sharon, the then young daughter of the mayor, broke out into the spotlight as a singer with the release of the LP DJ's Pet.

On December 22, 1979, along with Manila, Quezon City, Caloocan, and other cities in the country, Pasay became a highly urbanized city.

In 1981, LRT Line 1 opened its Pasay stations, including its Baclaran terminal on the Parañaque border, marking a return to rapid urban rail.

==== EDSA people power ====
The situation changed in the city in the immediate aftermath of the People Power Revolution. Cuneta left his post to be replaced by two acting mayors, Eduardo Calixto and Norman Urbina, only to be reelected in 1988 and serving for three more terms, before handing over to Jovito Claudio in 1998. Upon the end of his term, he was the city's longest ever city mayor. Claudio, himself replaced by the then vice mayor Wenceslao "Peewee" Trinidad in 2000, saw the building of the MRT Line 3's southern terminus in the city, linked to the LRT Line 1 along Taft Avenue, and the Pasay City General Hospital and Ninoy Aquino International Airport Terminal 2 were both opened to the public. All these and other projects spurred a new era of growth in the city that continues to this day. The EDSA Entertainment Complex, located just to the city's west along EDSA, just miles from the Baclaran, Parañaque, for many years now is very well known for adult entertainment, including prostitution.

=== Contemporary ===
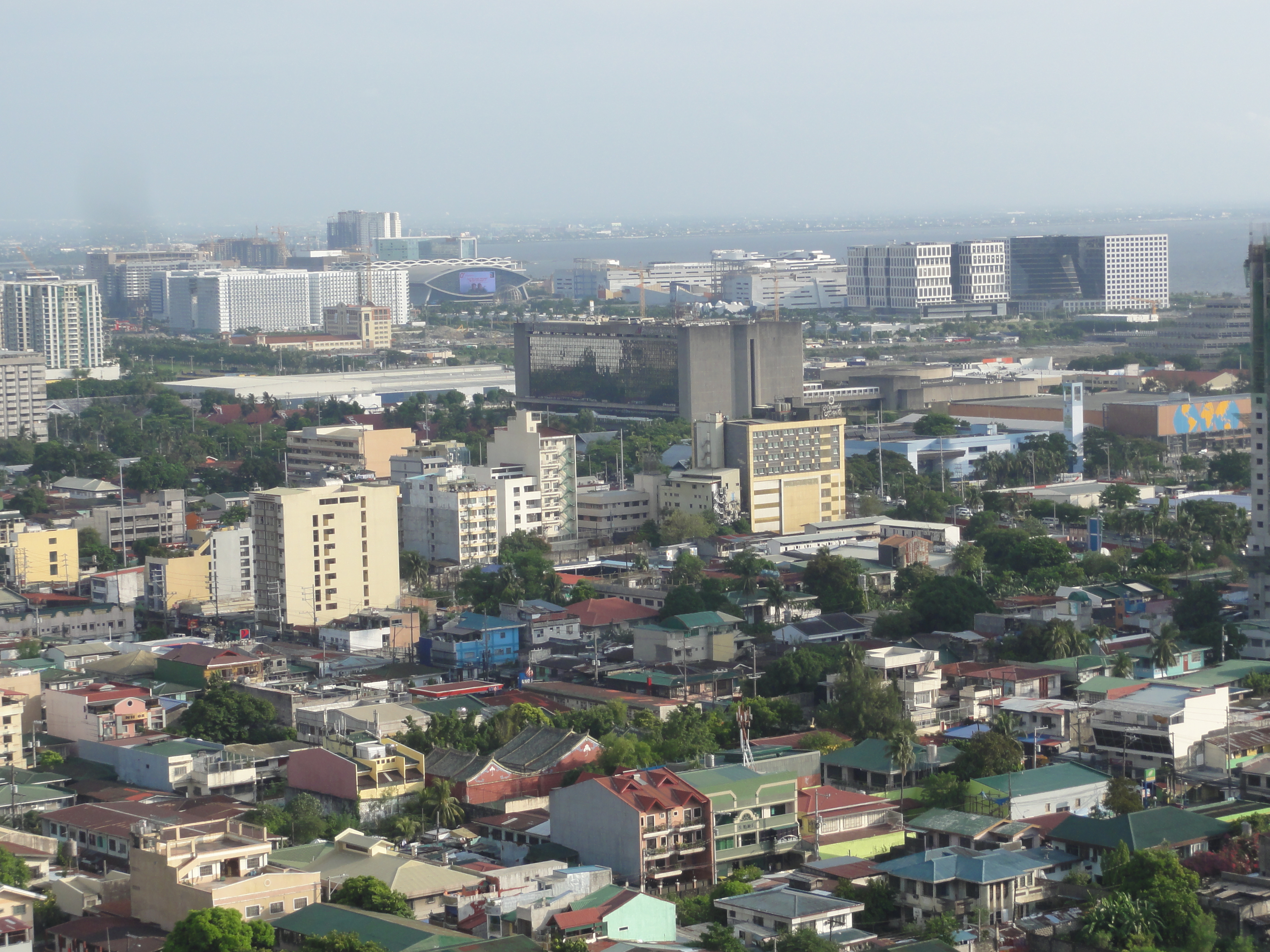
Aerial view of Pasay, 2015

In 2006, the SM Mall of Asia, the largest shopping center overall in the country, was opened, and the area around this mall began to grow into the city's business center in subsequent years that followed, followed by the opening of the city's biggest sports venue, the Mall of Asia Arena. Two years later, the NAIA Terminal 3 opened its doors in July 2008, and within two years, progress blossomed in the vicinity with the opening of yet another residential and entertainment hub, Newport City, strengthened by the construction of the NAIA Expressway in 2016.

In 2007, then-Acting Mayor Allan Panaligan carried a plan to construct a new city hall located at the Central Business Park-I Island A along Macapagal Avenue. However, the plan has not come into fruition until now.

In 2021, Mayor Imelda Calixto-Rubiano announced that the city government was planning to build a new hospital facility in the city. An appropriate location for the new hospital is still to be determined given the city's geographically small area and dense population.

== Geography ==
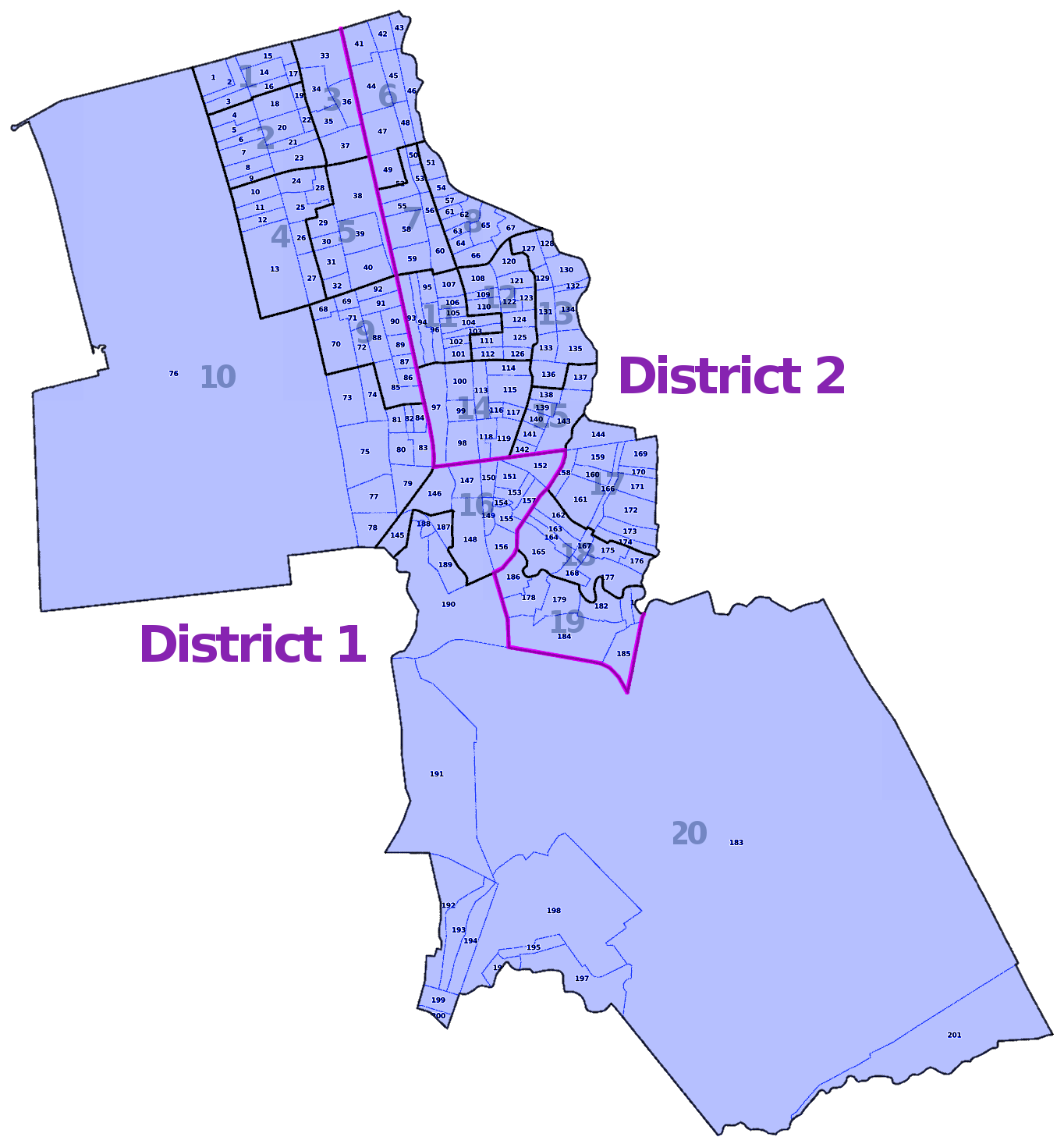
Zones and barangays of Pasay

Pasay covers a total land area of 18.64 square kilometers (7.20 sq mi), making it the third smallest political subdivision in the National Capital Region and fourth in the whole country. It borders the capital city of Manila to the north, Parañaque to the south, Makati to the northeast, Taguig to the east, and Manila Bay to the west. The city can be divided into three distinct areas: the city's urban area with an area of 5.505 square kilometers (2.125 sq mi); the Civil Aeronautics Administration (CAA) complex, which includes Ninoy Aquino International Airport (NAIA) and the Villamor Airbase, with an area of 9.5 square kilometers (3.7 sq mi); and the existing reclaimed land from Manila Bay with an area of 4.00 square kilometers (1.54 sq mi). The under-construction Pasay Harbor City and new SM Prime land reclamation projects are expected to add 6.25 square kilometers (2.41 sq mi) to the city's total land area.

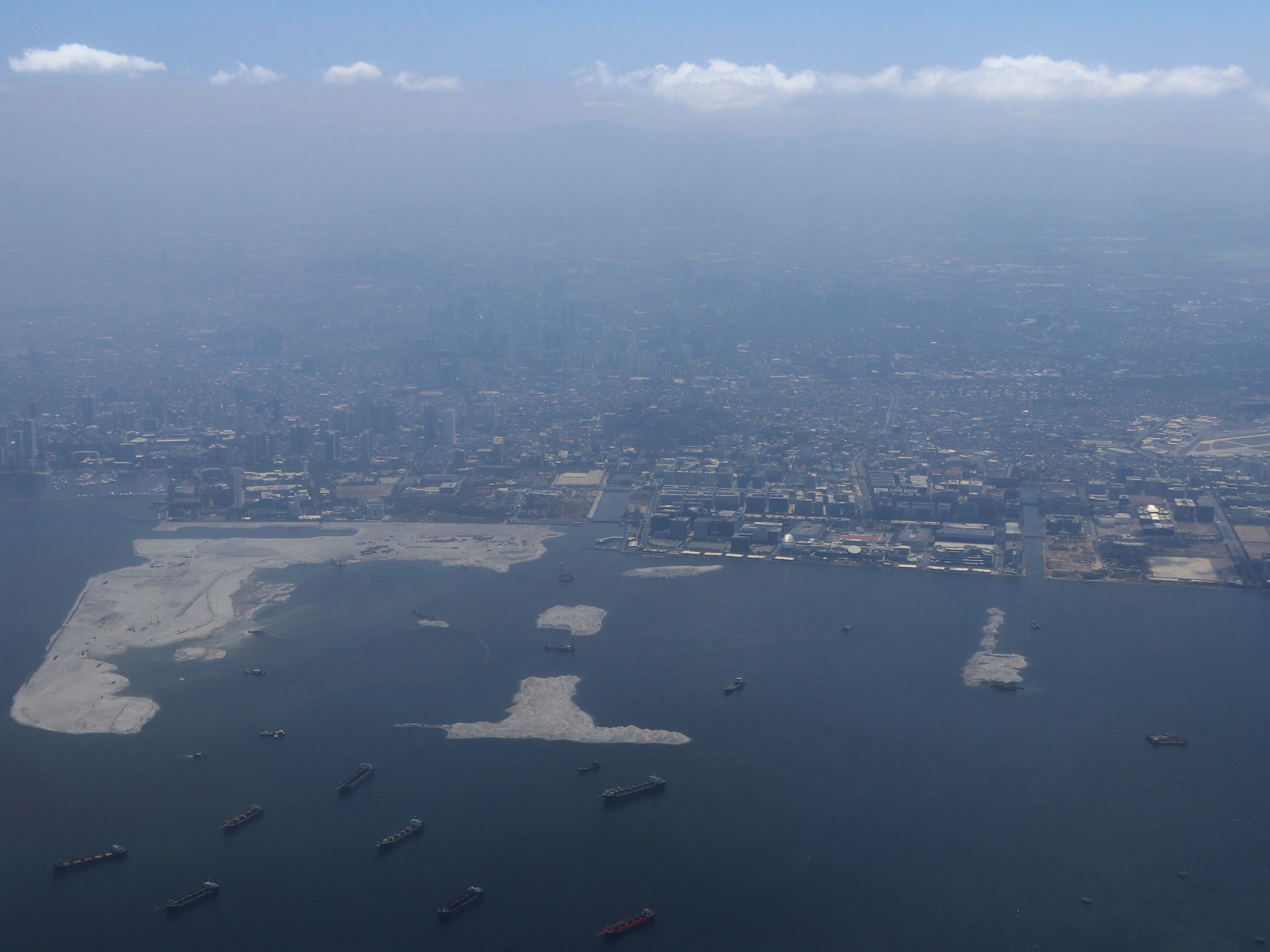
Aerial view of Pasay with land reclamations

Pasay is composed of two districts, subdivided into 20 zones, with a total of 201 barangays. The barangays do not have names but are only designated with sequential numbers. The largest zone, with an area of 5.10 square kilometers (1.97 sq mi), is Zone 19, which covers barangays 178 and 191. The smallest zone with an area of 10 hectares (25 acres) is Zone 1, covering Barangays 1 to 3 and 14 to 17.

Table of Barangays

Barangay	Zone	District	Other known names
1	1	1	
2	1	1	
3	1	1	
4	2	1	
5	2	1	
6	2	1	
7	2	1	
8	2	1	
9	2	1	
10	4	1	
11	4	1	
12	4	1	
13	4	1	Department of Foreign Affairs
14	1	1	
15	1	1	
16	1	1	
17	1	1	
18	2	1	
19	2	1	
20	2	1	
21	2	1	
22	2	1	
23	2	1	
24	4	1	
25	4	1	
26	4	1	
27	4	1	
28	4	1	
29	5	1	
30	5	1	
31	5	1	
32	5	1	
33	3	1	
34	3	1	
35	3	1	
36	3	1	
37	3	1	
38	5	1	
39	5	1	
40	5	1	
41	6	2	
42	6	2	
43	6	2	Tramo
44	6	2	
45	6	2	
46	6	2	
47	6	2	
48	6	2	
49	6	2	
50	7	2	
51	8	2	
52	7	2	
53	7	2	
54	8	2	
55	7	2	
56	7	2	
57	8	2	
58	7	2	
59	7	2	
60	7	2	
61	8	2	
62	8	2	
63	8	2	
64	8	2	
65	8	2	
66	8	2	
67	8	2	
68	9	1	
69	9	1	
70	9	1	
71	9	1	
72	9	1	
73	10	1	
74	10	1	
75	10	1	
76	10	1	Bay City
77	10	1	
78	10	1	Baclaran
79	10	1	
80	10	1	
81	10	1	
82	10	1	
83	10	1	
84	10	1	
85	9	1	
86	9	1	
87	9	1	
88	9	1	
89	9	1	
90	9	1	
91	9	1	
92	9	1	Victory Pasay Mall
93	11	2	Libertad
94	11	2	
95	11	2	
96	11	2	
97	14	2	
98	14	2	
99	14	2	
100	14	2	
101	11	2	
102	11	2	
103	11	2	
104	11	2	
105	11	2	
106	11	2	
107	11	2	
108	12	2	
109	12	2	
110	12	2	
111	12	2	
112	12	2	
113	14	2	
114	14	2	
115	14	2	
116	14	2	
117	14	2	
118	14	2	
119	14	2	
120	12	2	
121	12	2	
122	12	2	
123	12	2	
124	12	2	
125	12	2	Ventanilla
126	12	2	
127	13	2	
128	13	2	
129	13	2	
130	13	2	
131	13	2	Magtibay
132	13	2	
133	13	2	
134	13	2	
135	13	2	
136	13	2	
137	15	2	
138	15	2	
139	15	2	
140	15	2	
141	15	2	
142	15	2	
143	15	2	
144	17	2	
145	16	1	Santo Niño
146	16	1	
147	16	1	
148	16	1	
149	16	1	
150	16	1	
151	16	1	
152	16	1	
153	16	1	
154	16	1	
155	16	1	
156	16	1	
157	16	1	
158	17	2	
159	17	2	
160	17	2	
161	17	2	
162	18	2	
163	18	2	
164	18	2	
165	18	2	
166	17	2	
167	18	2	
168	18	2	
169	17	2	
170	17	2	
171	17	2	
172	17	2	
173	17	2	
174	17	2	
175	18	2	
176	18	2	
177	18	2	Malibay
178	19	2	Aurora Boulevard
179	19	2	Maricaban
180	19	2	Maricaban
181	19	2	Bayanihan
182	19	2	Villamor
183	20	1	Villamor
184	19	2	Maricaban
185	19	2	Maricaban
186	19	2	Maricaban
187	20	1	Don Carlos Village
188	20	1	Don Carlos Village
189	20	1	Don Carlos Village
190	20	1	Don Carlos Village
191	20	1	Domestic Airport
192	20	1	Pildera Uno
193	20	1	Pildera Dos
194	20	1	Pildera Dos
195	20	1	Sun Valley
196	20	1	Sun Valley
197	20	1	Baltao
198	20	1	Rivera Village
199	20	1	Rivera Village
200	20	1	Kalayaan Village
201	20	1	Kalayaan Village/Merville

Populated places / barangays in Pasay

- Apelo Cruz
- Baclaran
- Baltao
- Bay City
- Cabrera
- Cartimar
- Cuyegkeng
- Don Carlos Village
- Edang
- F. B. Harrison
- Juan Sumulong
- Kalayaan
- Leveriza
- Libertad
- Malibay
- Manila Bay Reclamation
- Marcela Marcelo
- Maricaban
- M. Dela Cruz
- Newport City
- Nichols
- Padre Burgos
- Pasay Rotonda
- Philippine International Convention Center
- Pildera I
- Pildera II
- Rivera Village
- San Pablo
- San Isidro
- San Jose
- San Rafael
- San Roque
- Santa Clara
- Santo Niño
- Tramo
- Tripa de Gallina
- Ventanilla
- Villamor

=== Climate ===
Under the Köppen climate classification system, Pasay features a tropical savanna climate (Köppen climate classification Aw).

Climate data for Pasay (Ninoy Aquino International Airport) 1991–2020, extremes 1947–present
Month	Jan	Feb	Mar	Apr	May	Jun	Jul	Aug	Sep	Oct	Nov	Dec	Year
Record high °C (°F)	35.8 (96.4)	35.1 (95.2)	36.5 (97.7)	38.8 (101.8)	38.2 (100.8)	38.0 (100.4)	36.4 (97.5)	36.5 (97.7)	35.6 (96.1)	36.0 (96.8)	35.8 (96.4)	34.4 (93.9)	38.8 (101.8)
Mean daily maximum °C (°F)	30.4 (86.7)	31.1 (88.0)	32.6 (90.7)	34.3 (93.7)	34.2 (93.6)	32.8 (91.0)	31.4 (88.5)	30.8 (87.4)	31.1 (88.0)	31.4 (88.5)	31.4 (88.5)	30.5 (86.9)	31.8 (89.2)
Daily mean °C (°F)	26.6 (79.9)	27.1 (80.8)	28.4 (83.1)	30.0 (86.0)	30.2 (86.4)	29.2 (84.6)	28.3 (82.9)	28.0 (82.4)	28.1 (82.6)	28.2 (82.8)	27.9 (82.2)	27.1 (80.8)	28.3 (82.9)
Mean daily minimum °C (°F)	22.9 (73.2)	23.2 (73.8)	24.5 (76.1)	25.7 (78.3)	26.3 (79.3)	25.9 (78.6)	25.2 (77.4)	25.1 (77.2)	25.1 (77.2)	24.9 (76.8)	24.4 (75.9)	23.7 (74.7)	24.7 (76.5)
Record low °C (°F)	14.8 (58.6)	14.6 (58.3)	16.0 (60.8)	18.7 (65.7)	19.1 (66.4)	20.0 (68.0)	18.3 (64.9)	17.4 (63.3)	19.1 (66.4)	18.0 (64.4)	17.2 (63.0)	16.3 (61.3)	14.6 (58.3)
Average rainfall mm (inches)	11.5 (0.45)	9.5 (0.37)	10.3 (0.41)	9.0 (0.35)	57.1 (2.25)	100.5 (3.96)	158.7 (6.25)	208.0 (8.19)	159.2 (6.27)	93.5 (3.68)	76.2 (3.00)	54.1 (2.13)	947.6 (37.31)
Average rainy days (≥ 0.1 mm)	3	3	3	3	7	11	16	16	16	11	8	8	105
Average relative humidity (%)	74	71	68	66	72	78	83	85	85	81	78	77	77
Source: PAGASA

== Demographics ==
Population census of Pasay
Year	Pop.	±% p.a.
1903	8,201	—
1918	18,697	+5.65%
1939	55,161	+5.29%
1948	88,728	+5.42%
1960	132,673	+3.41%
1970	206,283	+4.51%
1975	254,999	+4.34%
1980	287,770	+2.45%
1990	368,366	+2.50%
1995	408,610	+1.96%
2000	354,908	−2.98%
2007	403,064	+1.77%
2010	392,869	−0.93%
2015	416,522	+1.12%
2020	440,656	+1.19%
2024	453,186	+0.68%
Source: Philippine Statistics Authority

As of the 2024 census, Pasay had a population of 453,186. It currently ranks 11th in population size within Metro Manila. It also has 127,629 households. The population density is 32,440 inhabitants per square kilometer or 84,020 inhabitants per square mile.

=== Demonym ===
Residents of Pasay are called Pasayeño.

=== Language ===
Most residents speak Filipino (Tagalog) and English, with considerable numbers speaking other languages and dialects of the Philippines.

=== Religion ===
Like many other places in the country, Pasay is predominantly Roman Catholic. There is also a significant presence of Iglesia ni Cristo and other Protestant churches in the city, as well as Islam.

== Economy ==
Poverty incidence of Pasay (%)

Source: Philippine Statistics Authority

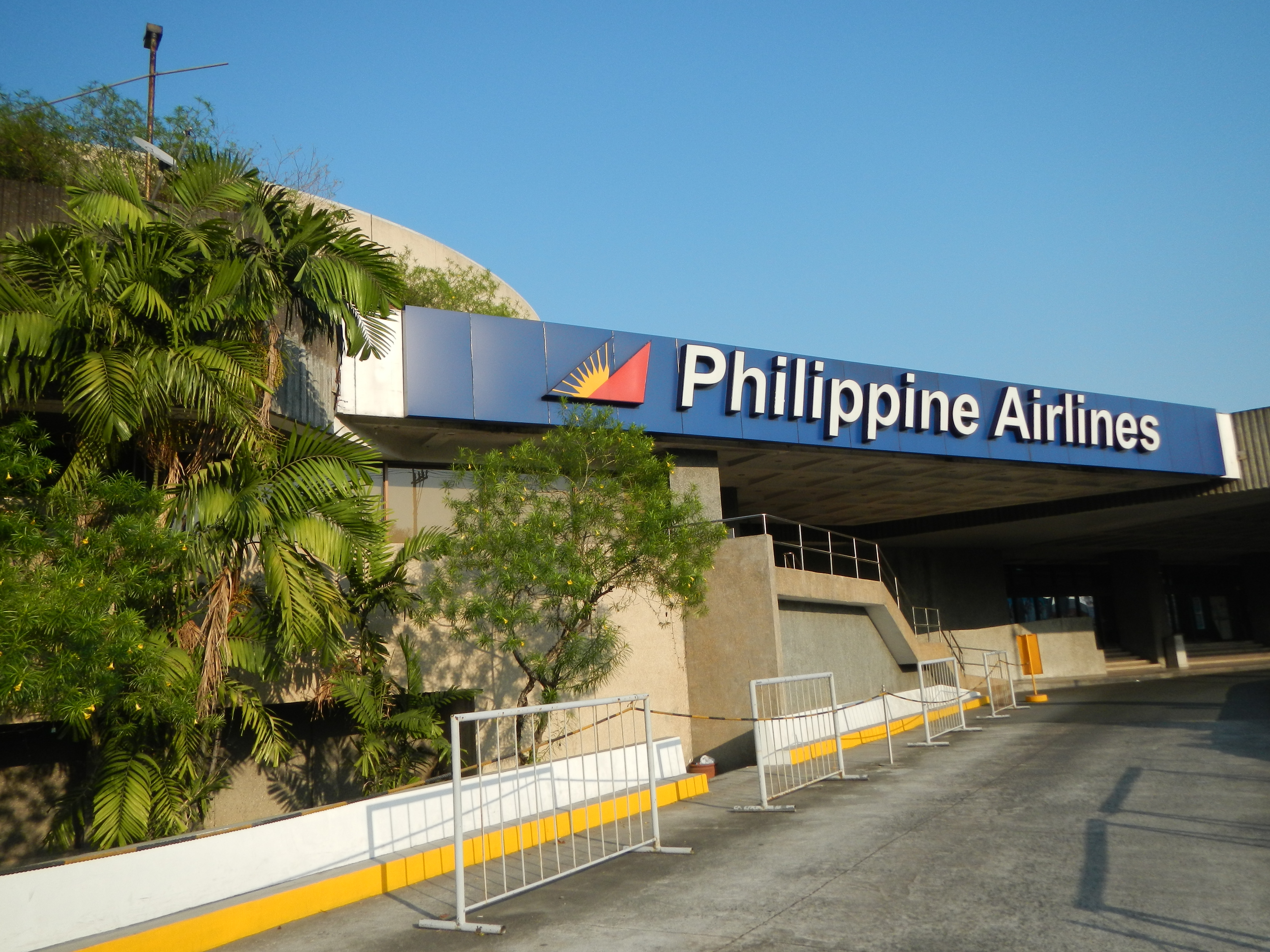
Headquarters of Philippine Airlines

Philippine Airlines is headquartered in the Philippine National Bank Financial Center beside the World Trade Center Manila in Pasay. Cebu Pacific, Cebgo, PAL Express, Philippines AirAsia have their headquarters on the grounds of Ninoy Aquino International Airport and in Pasay. Oishi (Liwayway), a snack company, also has its headquarters in Pasay.

National government offices found in Pasay include: Senate of the Philippines, Department of Foreign Affairs (DFA), Civil Aviation Authority of the Philippines, Civil Aeronautics Board, Manila International Airport Authority, the Philippine Department of Trade and Industry's export promotions agency – the Center for International Trade Expositions and Missions (CITEM) – located in the International Trade Complex's Golden Shell Pavilion, and the Overseas Workers Welfare Administration (OWWA), Office for Transportation Security (OTS). The main office of the Philippine National Bank is located in the city.

LBC Express headquarters is located at the Star Cruises Centre in the Newport Cybertourism Zone of Pasay.

Pasay has the second-highest per capita GDP of the country at ₱766,194 (US$14,250).

== Government ==
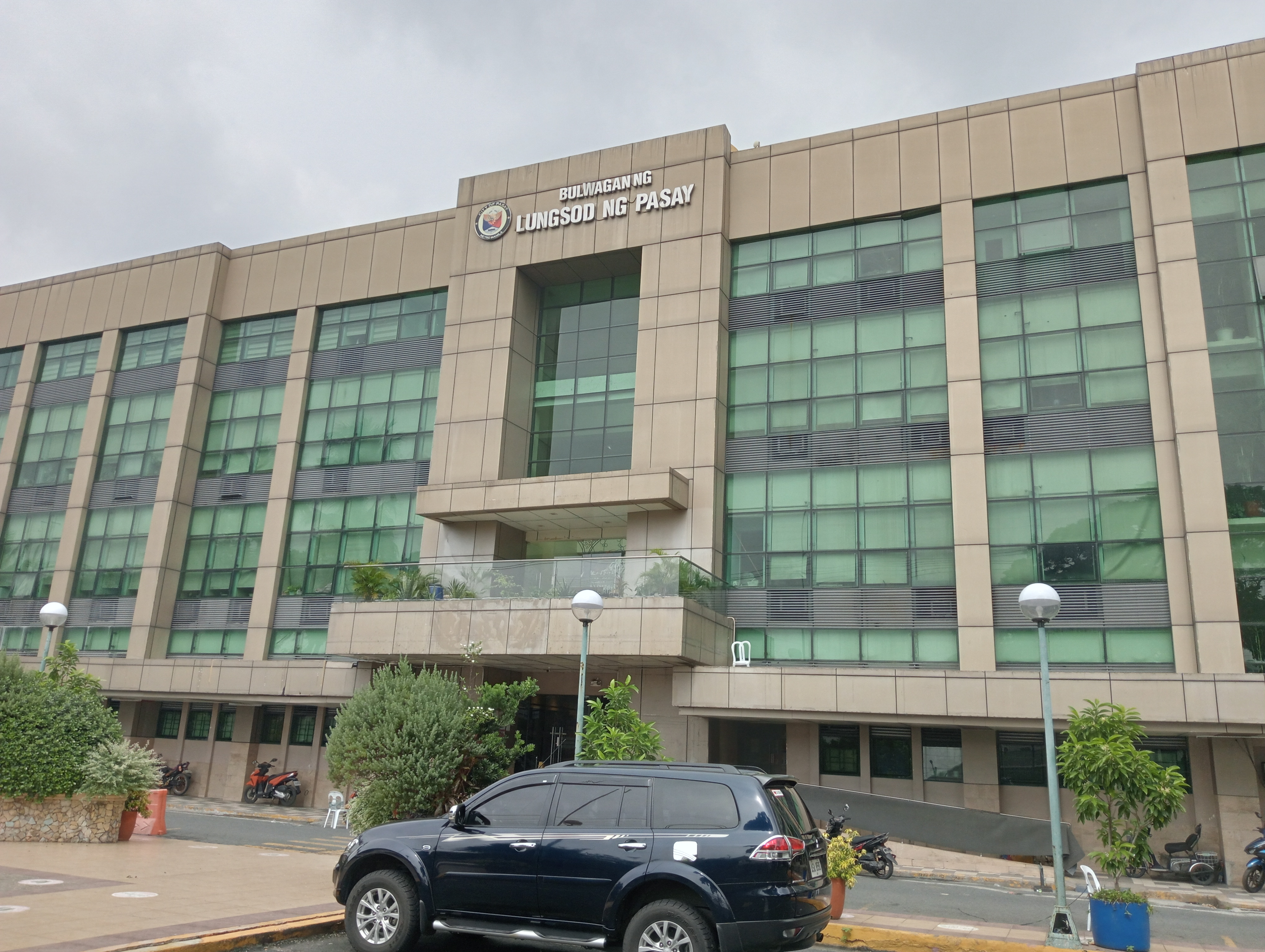
Pasay City Hall

=== Local government ===
Pasay is governed primarily by the city mayor, the vice mayor, and the city councilors. The mayor acts as the chief executive of the city while the city councilors act as its legislative body. The vice mayor, besides taking on mayoral responsibilities in case of a temporary vacancy, acts as the presiding officer of the city legislature. The legislative body is composed of 12 regular members (6 per district) and representatives from the barangay and the youth council.

=== Elected officials ===
Pasay City Officials (2025–Present)
Name	Party
House of Representatives
Antonino G. Calixto	Lakas
City Mayor
Imelda G. Calixto-Rubiano	PFP
City Vice Mayor
Mark Anthony A. Calixto	Lakas
First District
Miguel Antonio Cuneta	Lakas
Marlon Pesebre	Lakas
Mary Grace Santos	Lakas
Waldetrudes Del Rosario	Lakas
Abraham Albert Alvina	Lakas
Justine Jane Advincula	PFP
Second District
King Marlon "Khen" Magat	PFP
Graciano Noel "Yuyu" Del Rosario	TAPAT
Angelo Nicol "Allo" Arceo	PFP
Ian Vendivel	PFP
Allan Panaligan	PFP
Luigi Rubiano	TAPAT
Ex officio City Council members
ABC President	Enrique Calixto
SK President	Benedict Angeles

=== Former Elected Officials ===
Pasay City Officials (2022–2025)
Name	Party
House of Representatives
Antonino G. Calixto	PDP
City Mayor
Imelda G. Calixto-Rubiano	PDP
City Vice Mayor
Waldetrudes Del Rosario	LDP
First District
Mark Anthony Calixto	PDP
Mary Grace Santos	PDP
Marlon Pesebre	PDP
Ma. Antonia Cuneta	PDP
Albert Abraham Alvina	PDP
Ricardo Santos	PDP
Second District
Jose Isidro Jr.	PDP
Editha Manguerra	PDP
Donnabel Vendivel	PDP
Jennifer Panaligan	PDP
King Marlon Magat	PFP
Angelo Nicol Arceo	PDP
Ex officio City Council members
ABC President	Enrique Calixto
SK President	Benedict Angeles

== Sports ==
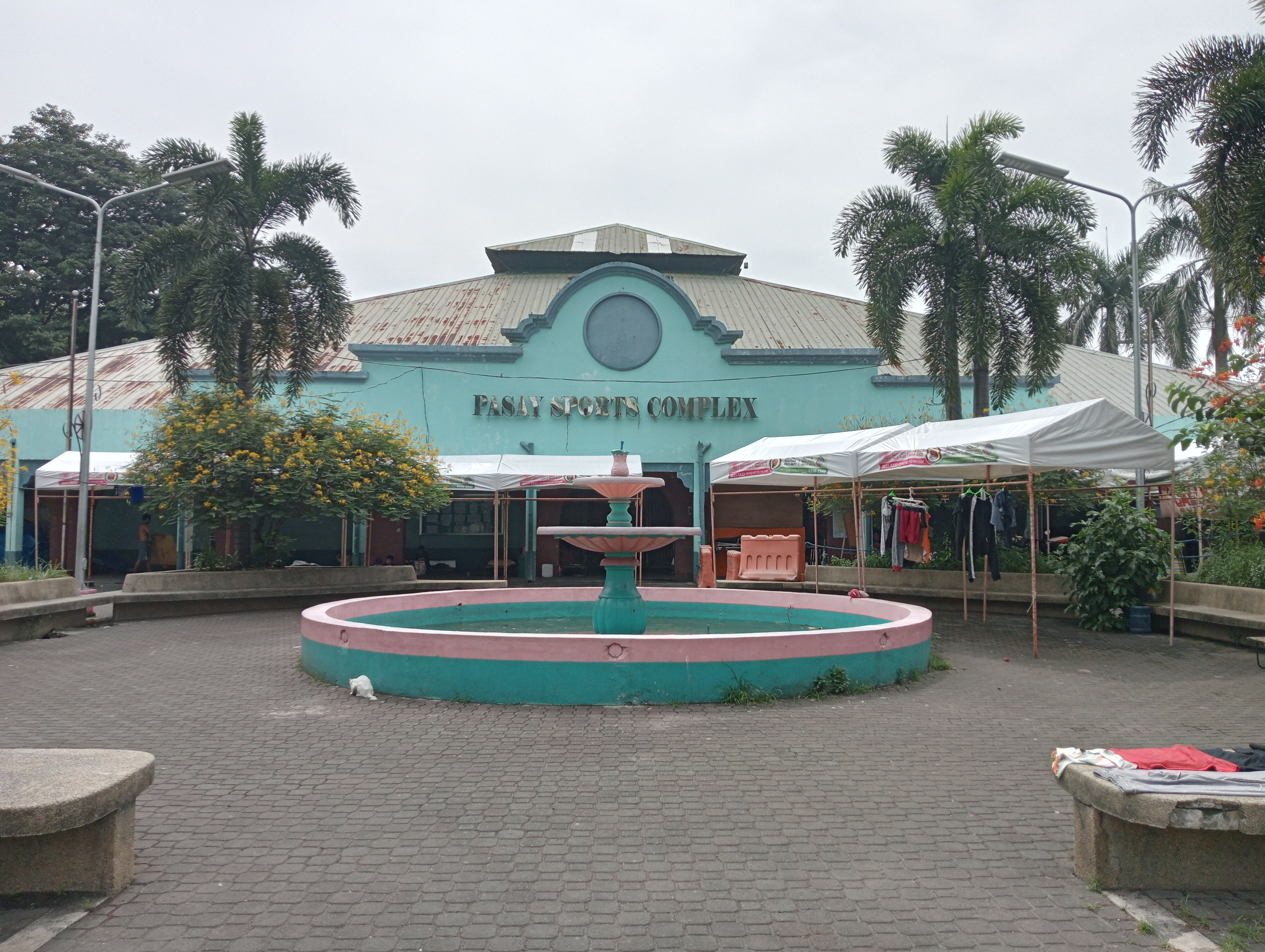
Pasay Sports Complex

Pasay is also home to sports venues such as the Cuneta Astrodome, SM Mall of Asia Arena, and Pasay Sports Complex. The SM Mall of Asia Arena also hosted some matches in the 2023 FIBA Basketball World Cup. The city has also been one of the venues of the 1981, 2005 and 2019 Southeast Asian Games.

Some barangays in Pasay have a basketball court (including gymnasiums). Badminton courts and billiard halls are also built in the city.

Pasay was once home to the Manila Polo Club until it was moved to Forbes Park, Makati in 1949.

The city's only professional sports team is the Pasay Voyagers, which competes in the Maharlika Pilipinas Basketball League since its second season.

=== Unity Run ===
On the list of largest running events in the world, based on the number of participants a record 209,000 registered running enthusiasts participated in 2012 Kahit Isang Araw Lang: Unity Run which started and ended at the SM Mall of Asia grounds.

The second edition of the race surpassed the Guinness World record of 116,086 participants posted in the Run for the Pasig River on October 10, 2010.

== Transportation ==
=== Airport ===
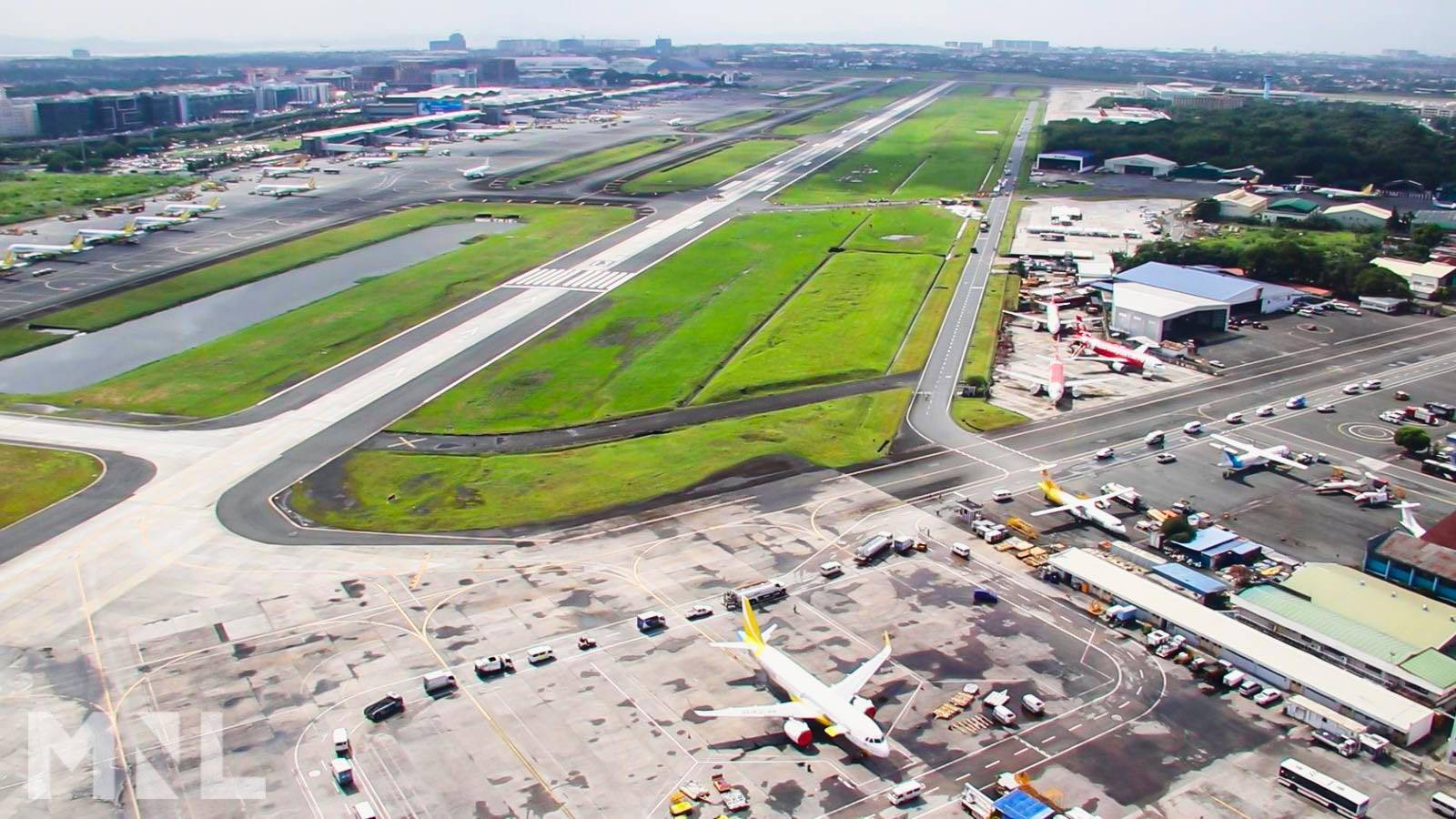
Aerial view of the Ninoy Aquino International Airport's portion within Pasay

The majority of Ninoy Aquino International Airport complex, also known as Nichols Field, is situated in Pasay, with the airport's terminals 2, 3, 4 (demolished), and 5 (under construction), falling under the city's jurisdiction; Terminal 1, the international cargo terminal, and the offices of airport ground servicing companies, are under the jurisdiction of neighboring Parañaque. The city is also the home of the Philippine Air Force's headquarters, Villamor Airbase.

=== Roads ===
==== Highways and main thoroughfares ====
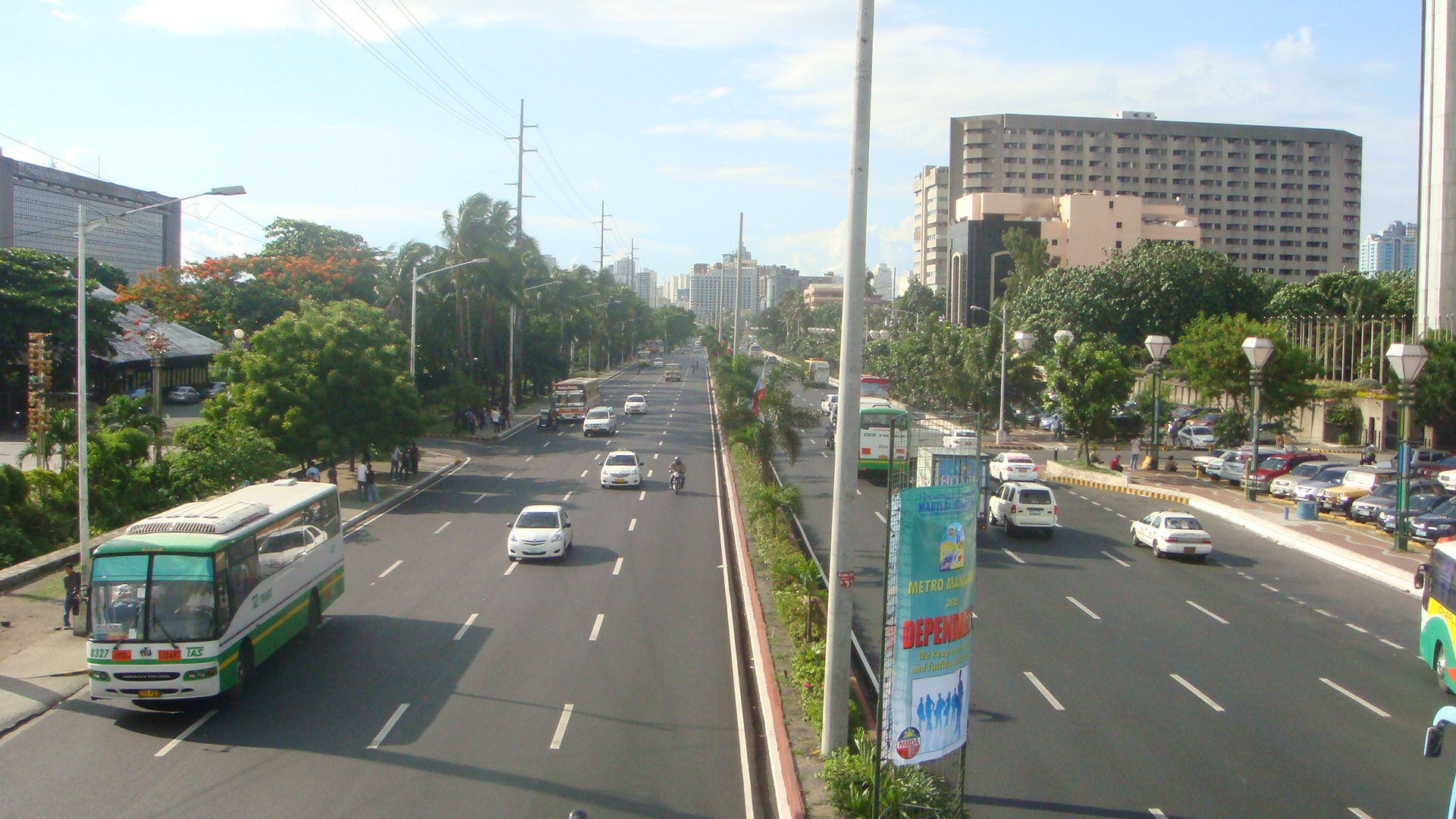
View of Roxas Boulevard from the Libertad overpass

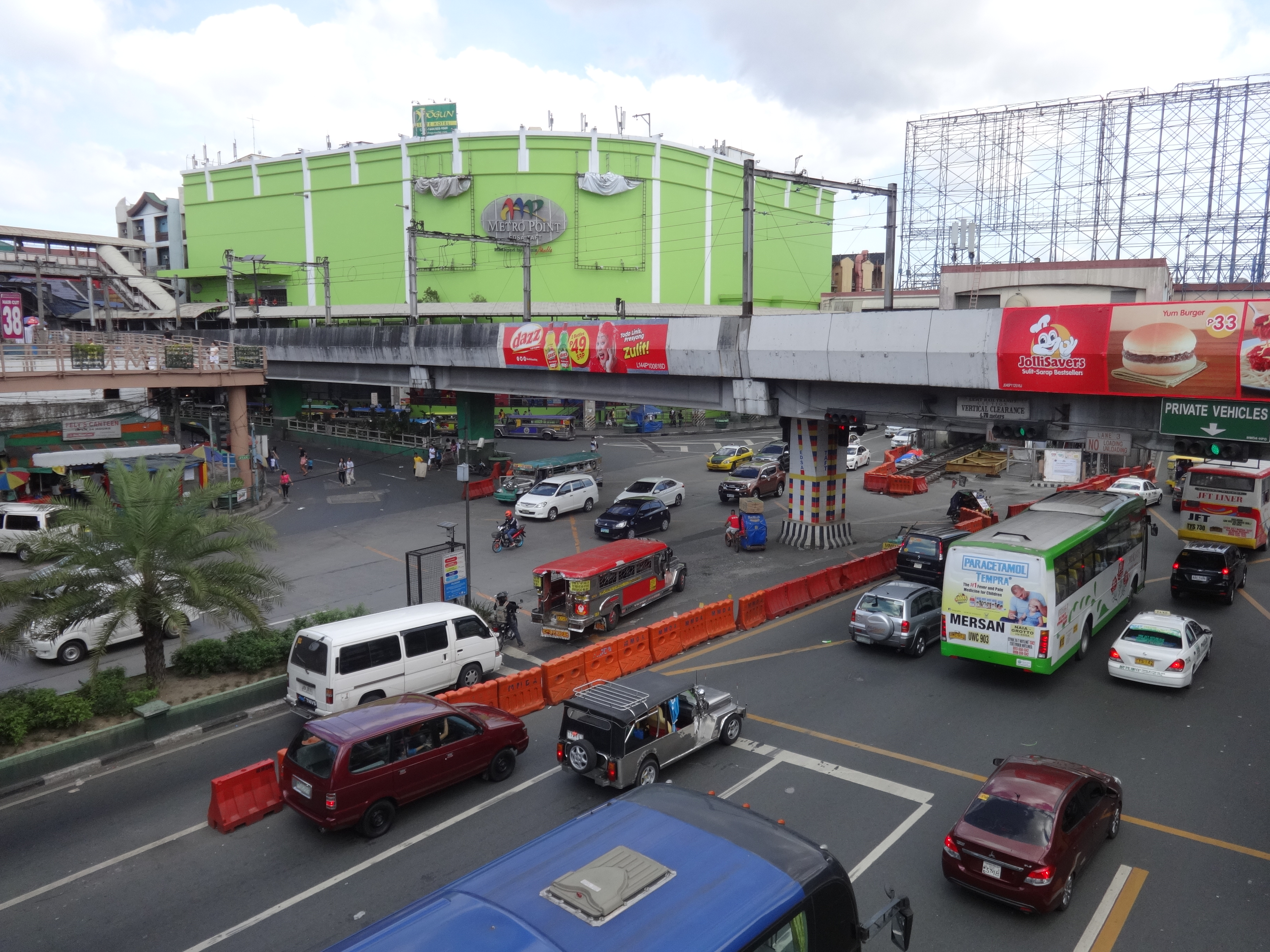
"Pasay Rotonda", the intersection of EDSA and Taft Avenue

Pasay is served by several highways and major thoroughfares. Epifanio delos Santos Avenue (EDSA/C-4 Road), Gil Puyat Avenue (Buendia Avenue) Roxas Boulevard, and Taft Avenue (R-2 Road) are the city's main thoroughfares. Secondary thoroughfares include Andrews Avenue, Antonio Arnaiz Avenue (formerly known as Libertad Street), Aurora Boulevard, Macapagal Boulevard, Domestic Road, Harrison Street, Jose W. Diokno Boulevard, Ninoy Aquino Avenue, and NAIA Road (MIA Road).

==== Expressways ====
Four expressways serve Pasay and other parts of Metro Manila and Calabarzon: Skyway, an elevated expressway passing along the Pasay–Taguig boundary; South Luzon Expressway (SLEX), commonly called as SLEX and a component of Asian Highway 26, follows a similar route with Skyway, but runs directly below it; NAIA Expressway, an elevated tolled expressway serving Terminals 1, 2, and 3 of Ninoy Aquino International Airport; and the CAVITEX–C-5 Link, which connects Circumferential Road 5 (C-5) in Taguig to the Manila–Cavite Expressway (CAVITEX).

=== Public transport ===
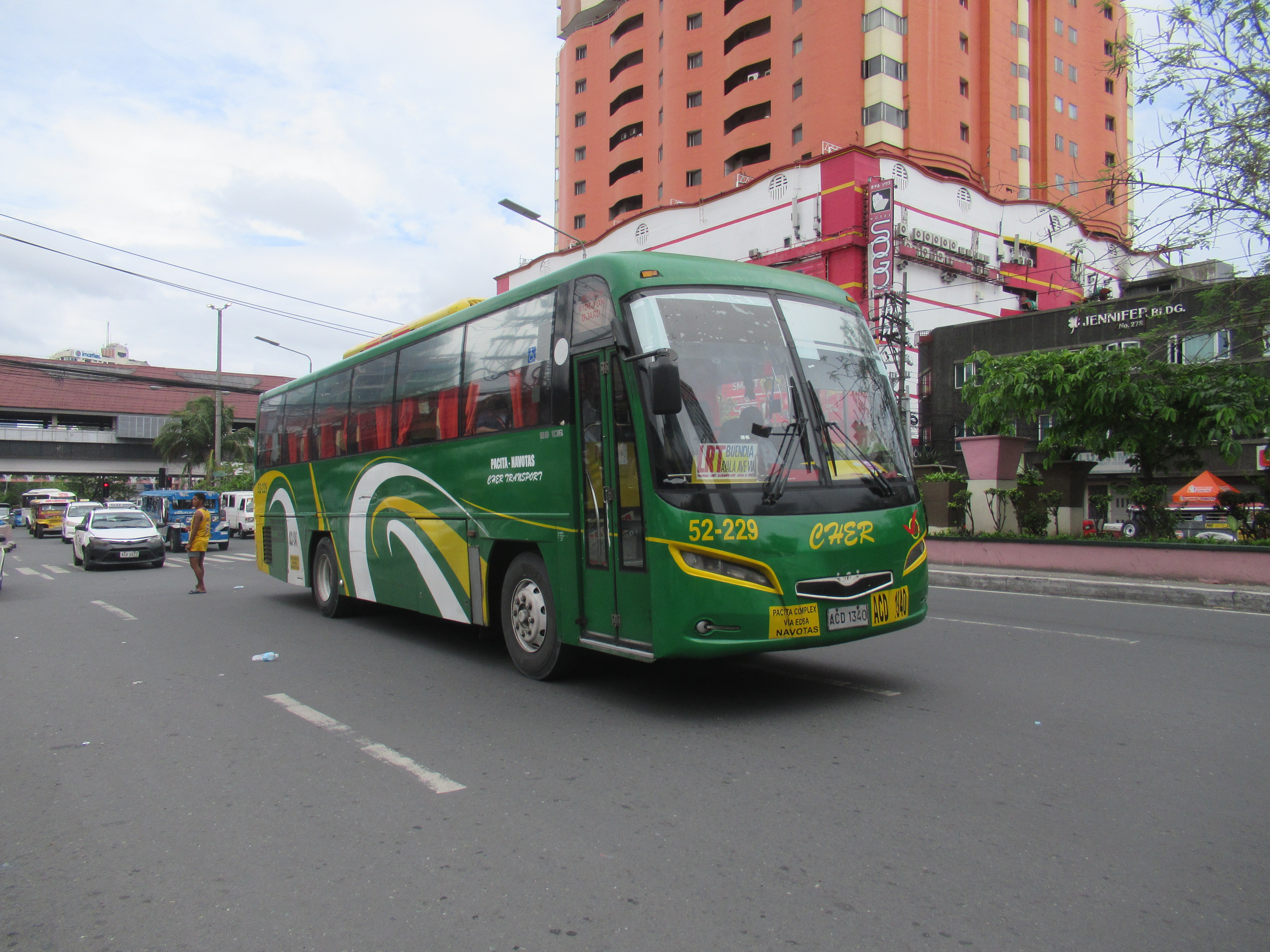
A bus plying Gil Puyat Avenue in Pasay

==== Jeepneys ====
Jeepneys ply the city's arterial roads, and serve the city's populated areas and nearby cities.

==== Buses ====
Buses provide city (commuter) and provincial (intercity) operation on Pasay. Provincial bus terminals are mostly found near the Gil Puyat Station, with other located along EDSA.

==== Rail ====
This city is served by two railway lines, the LRT Line 1 and MRT Line 3. LRT Line 1 has four stations in Pasay, namely Gil Puyat, Libertad, EDSA, and Baclaran, and has a depot located along Andrews Avenue. MRT Line 3 has only one station, named Taft Avenue, which serves as an interchange with LRT Line 1.

The under-construction Metro Manila Subway will traverse the city with a station at NAIA Terminal 3.

==== Other ====
Tricycles and pedicabs serve the barangays. Multicab services connect SM Mall of Asia with Baclaran in Parañaque, Gil Puyat Avenue, and Pasay Rotonda. Vans, especially UV Express, also provide service throughout the city and to other destinations in and around Metro Manila.

== Education ==
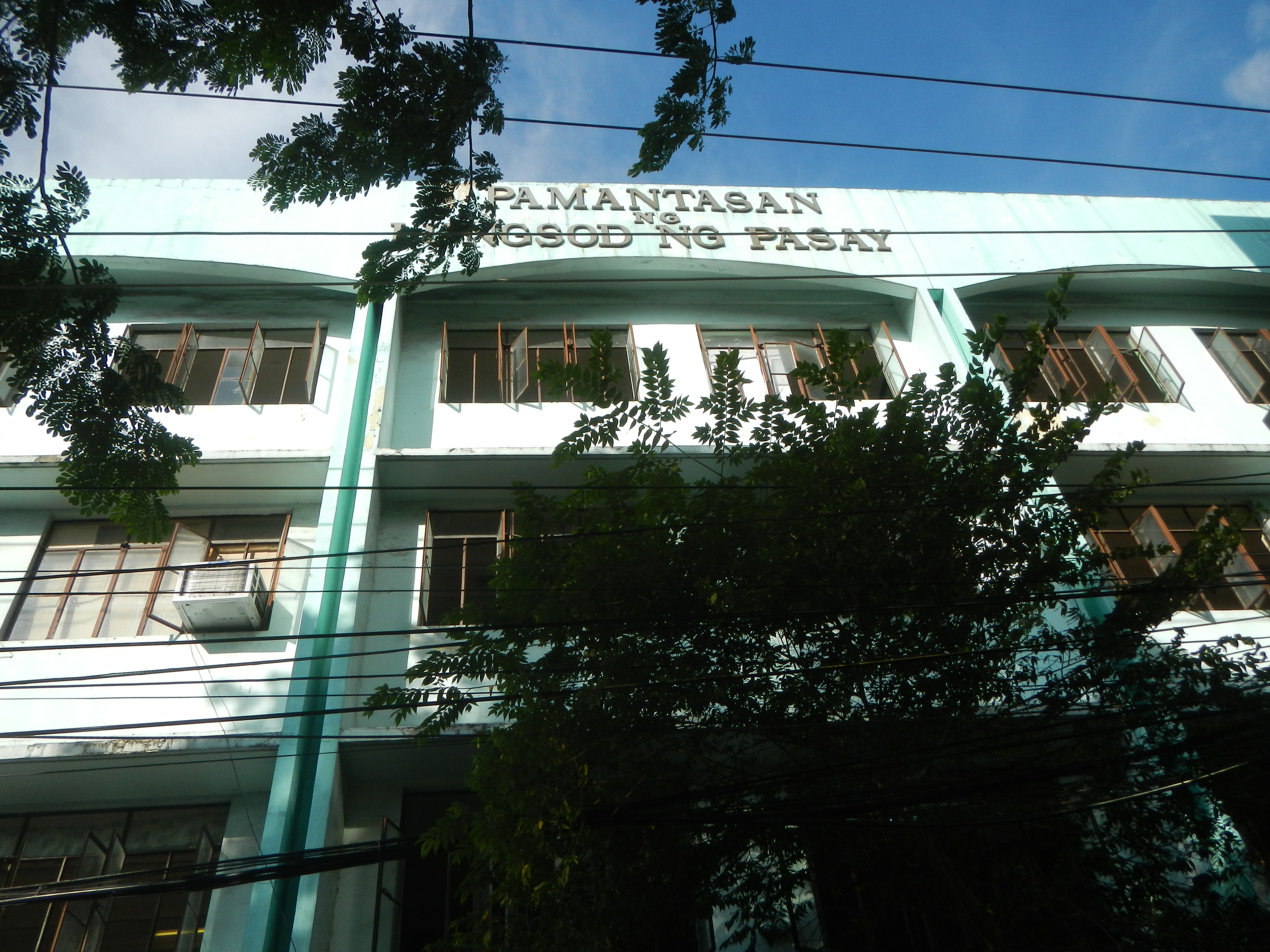
City University of Pasay

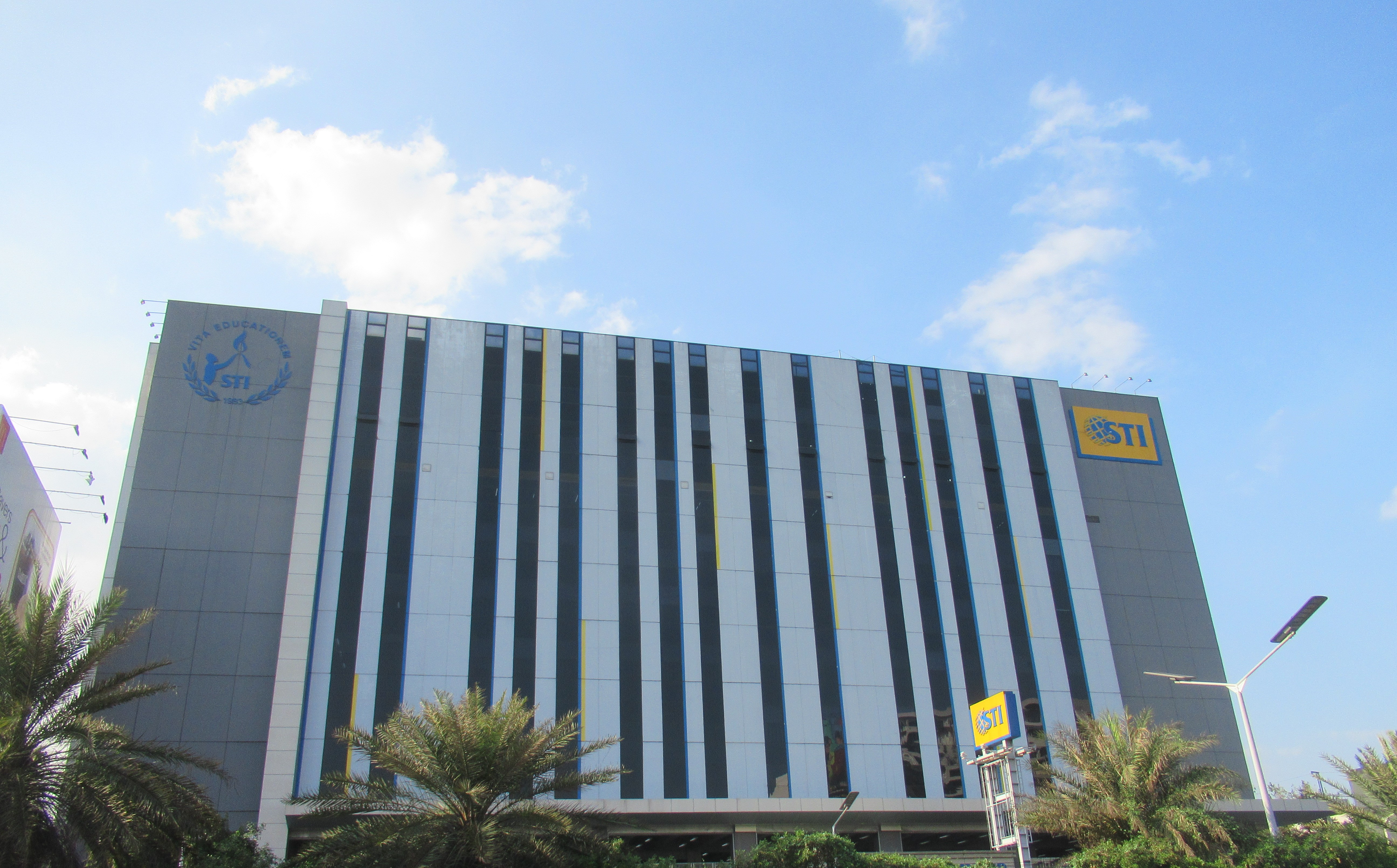
STI College - Pasay

The Schools Division Office (SDO) of Pasay City operates 18 public elementary schools and 8 high schools. Its operations are divided into four districts: Pasay North, Pasay East, Pasay South, and Pasay West. Special education is provided by the Philippine School for the Deaf and Philippine National School for the Blind, Pasay SPED Center, and one Alternative Learning System (ALS) center. Numerous private schools, including Catholic and parochial schools, also operate in the city, like the St. Mary's Academy, operated by nuns of the Religious of the Virgin Mary.

=== Colleges and universities ===
- Pamantasan ng Lungsod ng Pasay (City University of Pasay)
- National University - Mall of Asia
- Manila Tytana Colleges
- Asian Institute of Maritime Studies
- Lacson College
- Philippine Law School
- Wesleyan College of Manila
- Arellano University School of Law - Mabini Campus
- Arellano University Jose Abad Santos Campus - Pasay Campus
- Philippine State College of Aeronautics
- Airlink International Aviation College
- Manila Adventist College
- Southeastern College
- STI College Pasay-EDSA
- San Juan de Dios College
- International Electronics and Technical Institute Pasay

=== High schools ===
High schools in the city.

- Pasay City North High School – M. Dela Cruz Campus
- Pasay City South High School
- Pasay City East High School
- Pasay City West High School
- Pasay City National High School ("formerly called Pasay City North High School – Tramo Campus")
- Pasay City National Science High School
- Kalayaan National High School
- President Corazon "Cory" C. Aquino National High School

== International relations ==
=== Diplomatic missions ===
Countries that have set up permanent diplomatic offices or embassies in the city include:

- Japan
- Latvia

=== Sister cities ===
==== Local ====
- (Philippines) Las Piñas
- (Philippines) Parañaque
- (Philippines) Tacloban

==== International ====
- Union City, California, United States
- Sacramento, California, United States
- Jecheon, Chungcheongbuk-do, South Korea
- Tainan, Taiwan

== Notable personalities ==
- Johnny Alegre, Recording Artist
- Marcela Marcelo, revolutionary general
- Francisco Coching, National Artist of the Philippines for Visual Arts, comic book illustrator and write
- Juan Salcedo, Jr., National Scientist of the Philippines for Nutrition and Public Health
- Gelo Rivera, singer and leader of BGYO, pop group
- Emi Rubiano, filipina businesswoman
- Ramon Jacinto, businessman, musician, guitarist and former government official
- Darwin Ramos, Servant of God
- Alejandro D. Aclan, Catholic auxiliary bishop for the Archdiocese of Los Angeles
- Eli Soriano, Filipino preacher and televangelist
- Maricel Soriano, actress
- Wilfred Steven Uytengsu, president and CEO of the Alaska Milk Corporation
- Lisa Macuja-Elizalde, prima ballerina; in 1984, became the first Filipino and the first foreign soloist to join the Kirov Ballet
- Anita Linda, film actress
- Sharon Cuneta, singer, actress, and television host
- Pablo Cuneta, former mayor of Pasay (longest-serving mayor), father of Sharon Cuneta
- John Lloyd Cruz, actor
- Bernard Palanca, actor
- Josephine Roberto, pop singer
- Carl Guevara, actor and model
- Chariz Solomon, actress and television personality
- Nina Girado, pop/R&B singer, occasional songwriter, record producer, TV and radio personality at ABS-CBN
- Maricel Laxa, comedian and actress
- Vhong Navarro, comedian, dancer, member of Streetboy
- Renz Spangler, writer and book author
- Wacky Kiray, stand-up comedian and TV host
- Diego Llorico, actor
- Junna Tsukii, Filipino-Japanese karateka
- King Girado, singer, musician, model, and actor
- Michael DiGregorio, basketball player
- Mike Cortez, assistant coach of Blackwater Bossing
- Rodney Brondial, basketball player
- Ryan Araña, former basketball player
- Yousef Taha, basketball player
- Silvia Celeste Cortesi, Filipino-Italian model and Miss Universe Philippines 2022
- Fernando Lopez, former 3rd and 7th Vice President of the Philippines
- Jose Feria, 109th Associate Justice of the Supreme Court of the Philippines
- Johnny Monteiro, actor
- Gil de Leon, actor and father of Christopher de Leon
- Cesar Ramirez, actor

== Gallery ==
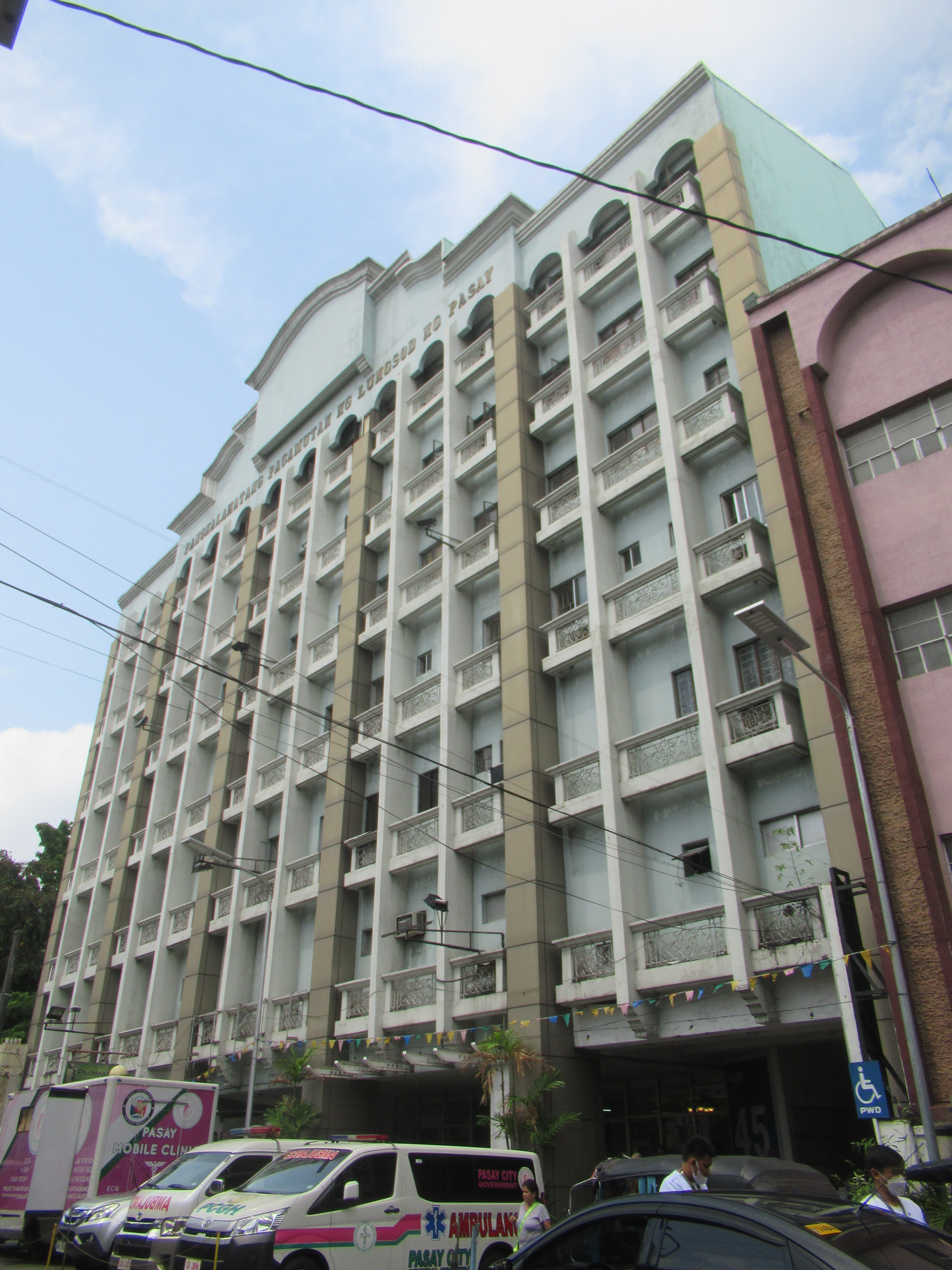
Pasay City General Hospital

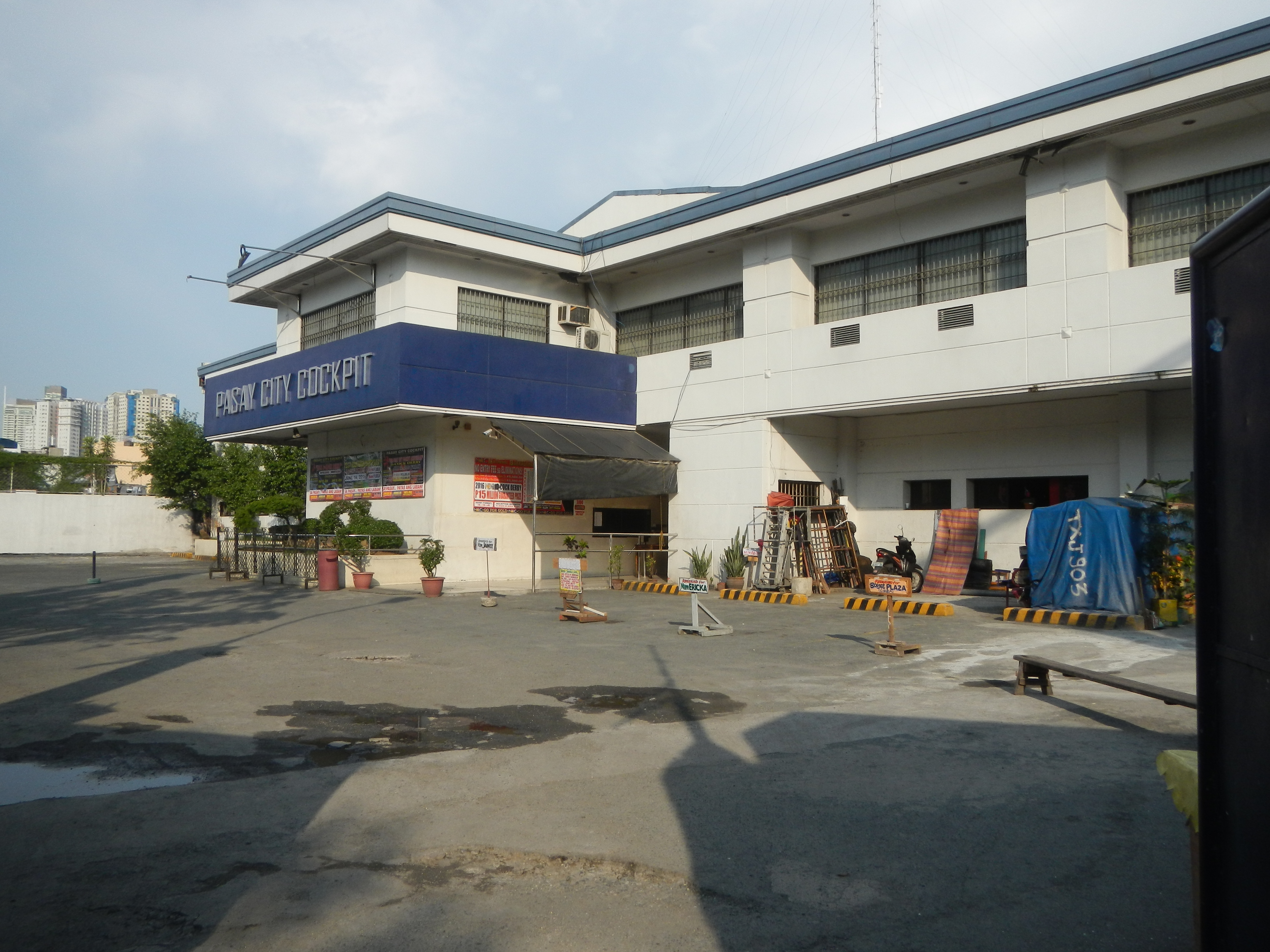
Pasay City Cockpit

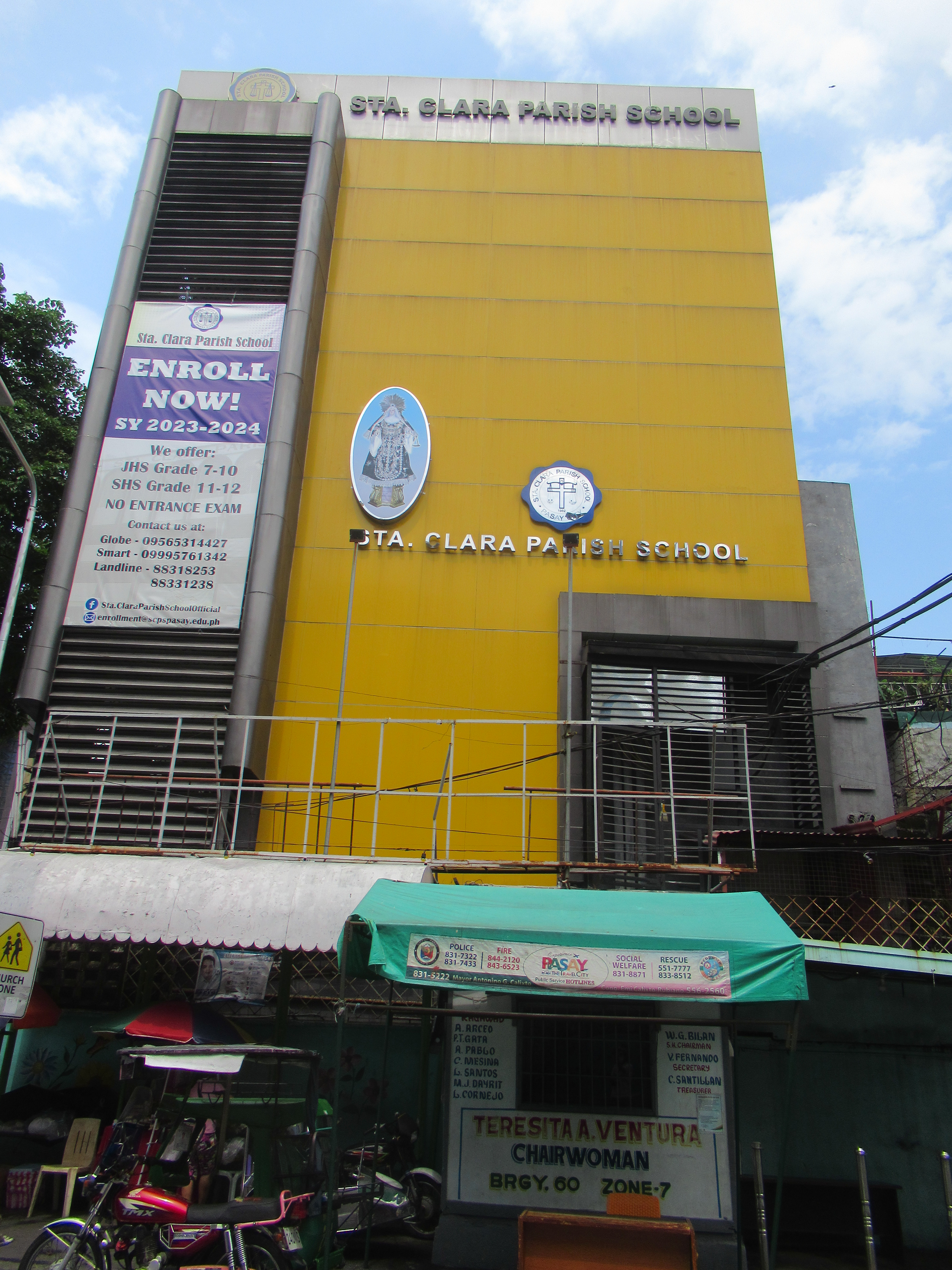
Sta. Clara Parish School (Pasay City)

The Heritage Hotel - Pasay

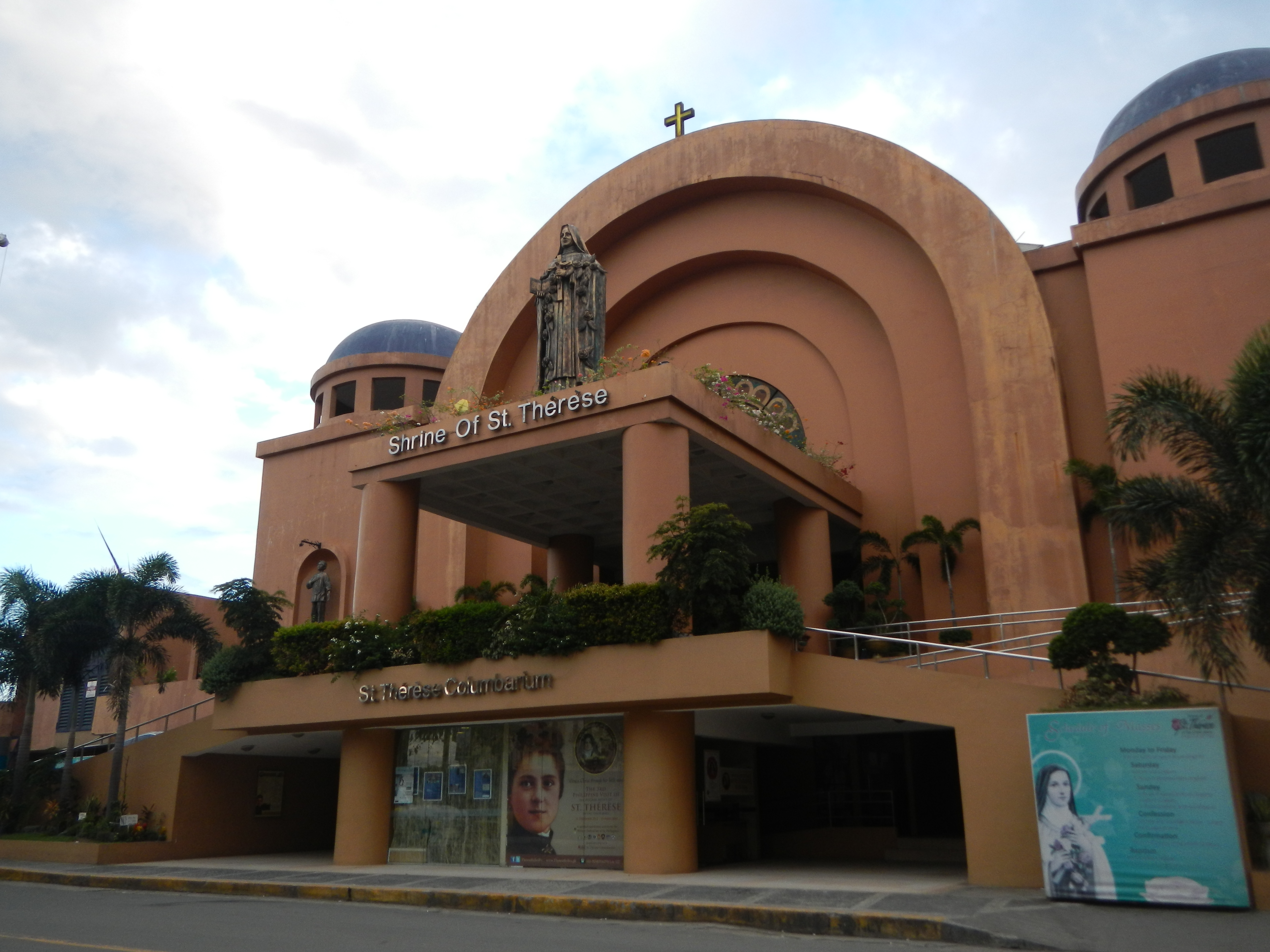
Shrine of St. Therese of the Child Jesus

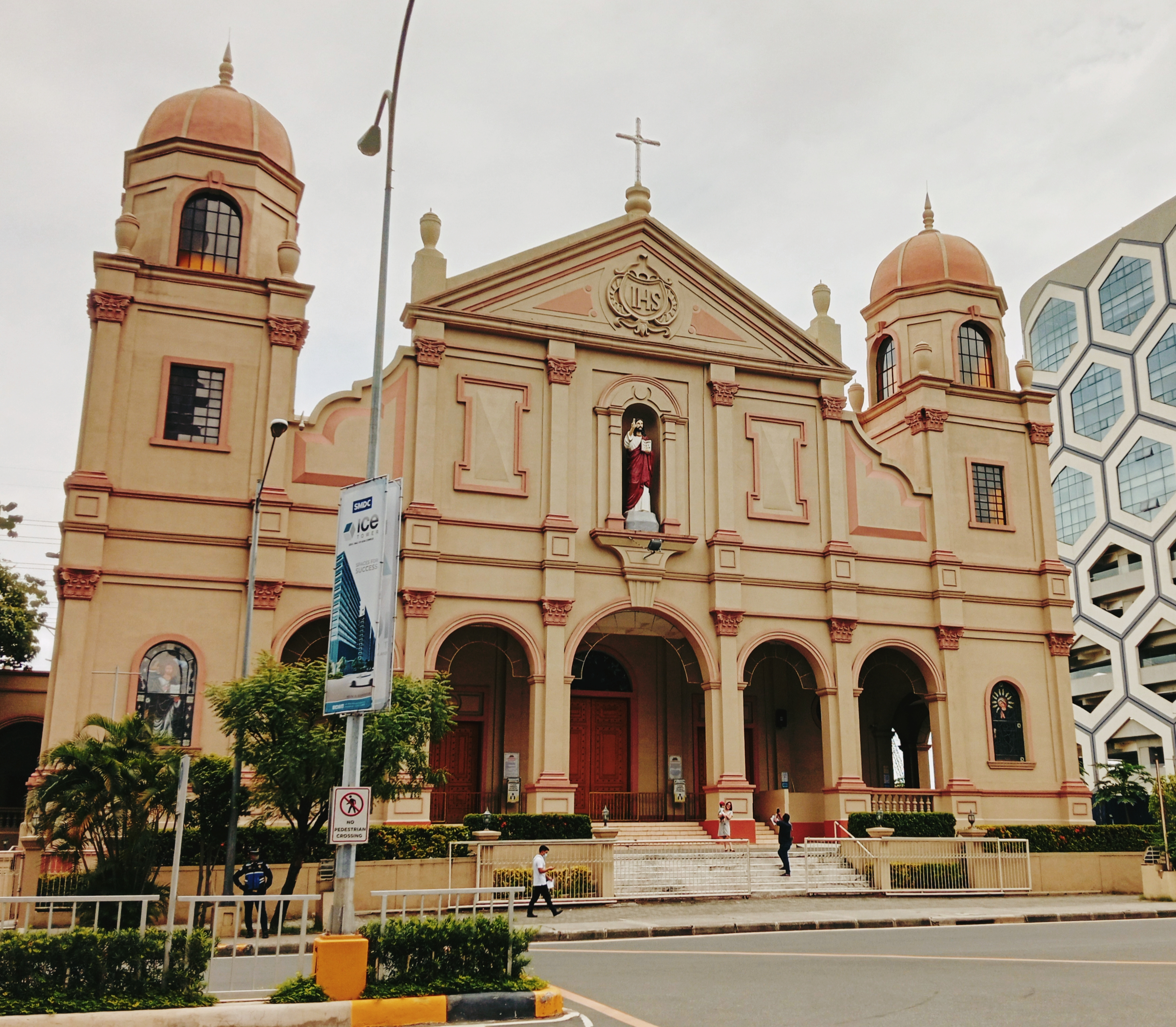
Archdiocesan Shrine of Jesus the Way, the Truth, and the Life

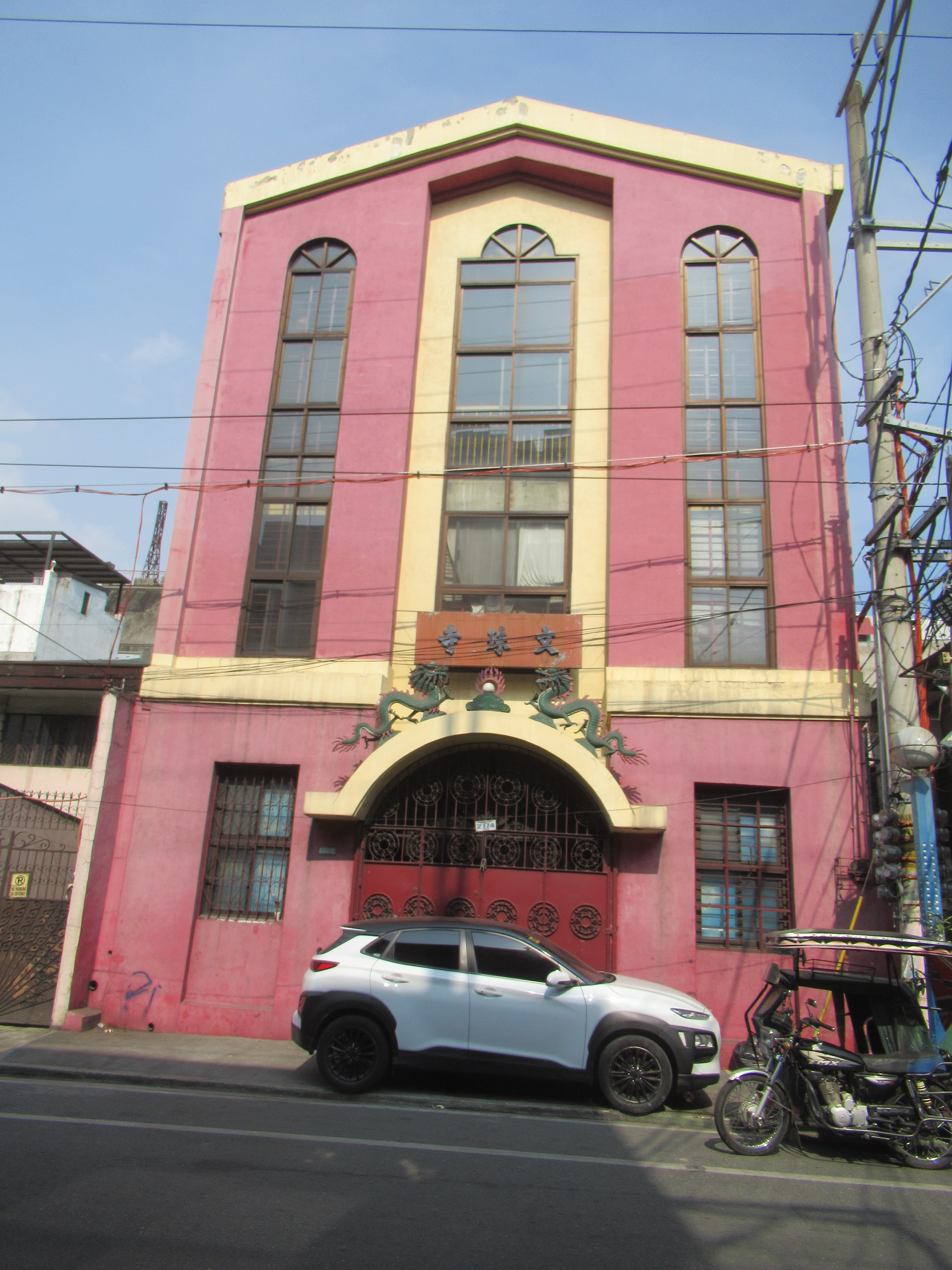
Bun Su Temple (文殊寺)

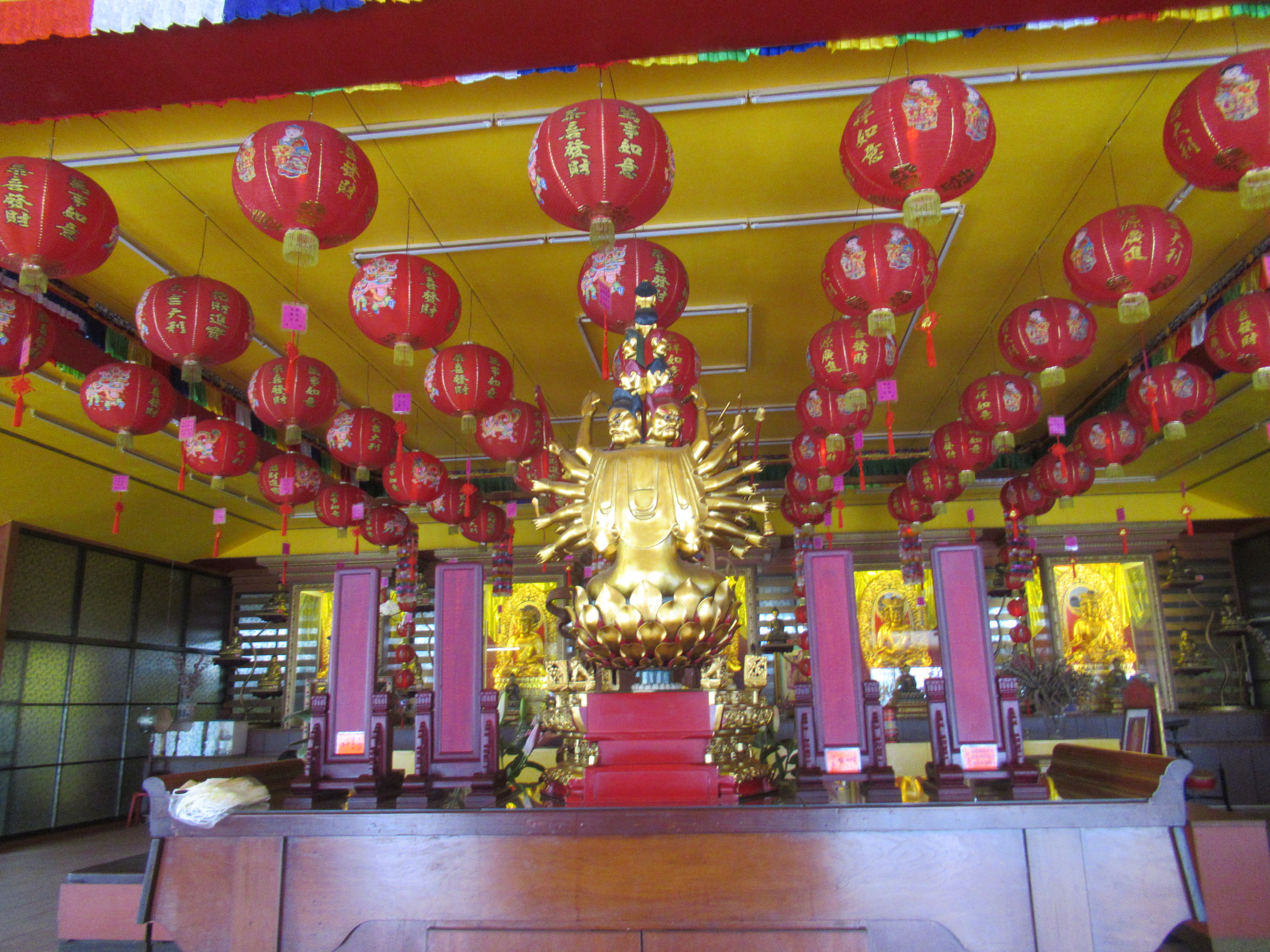
Chong Fu Temple (巴西巿包王府)

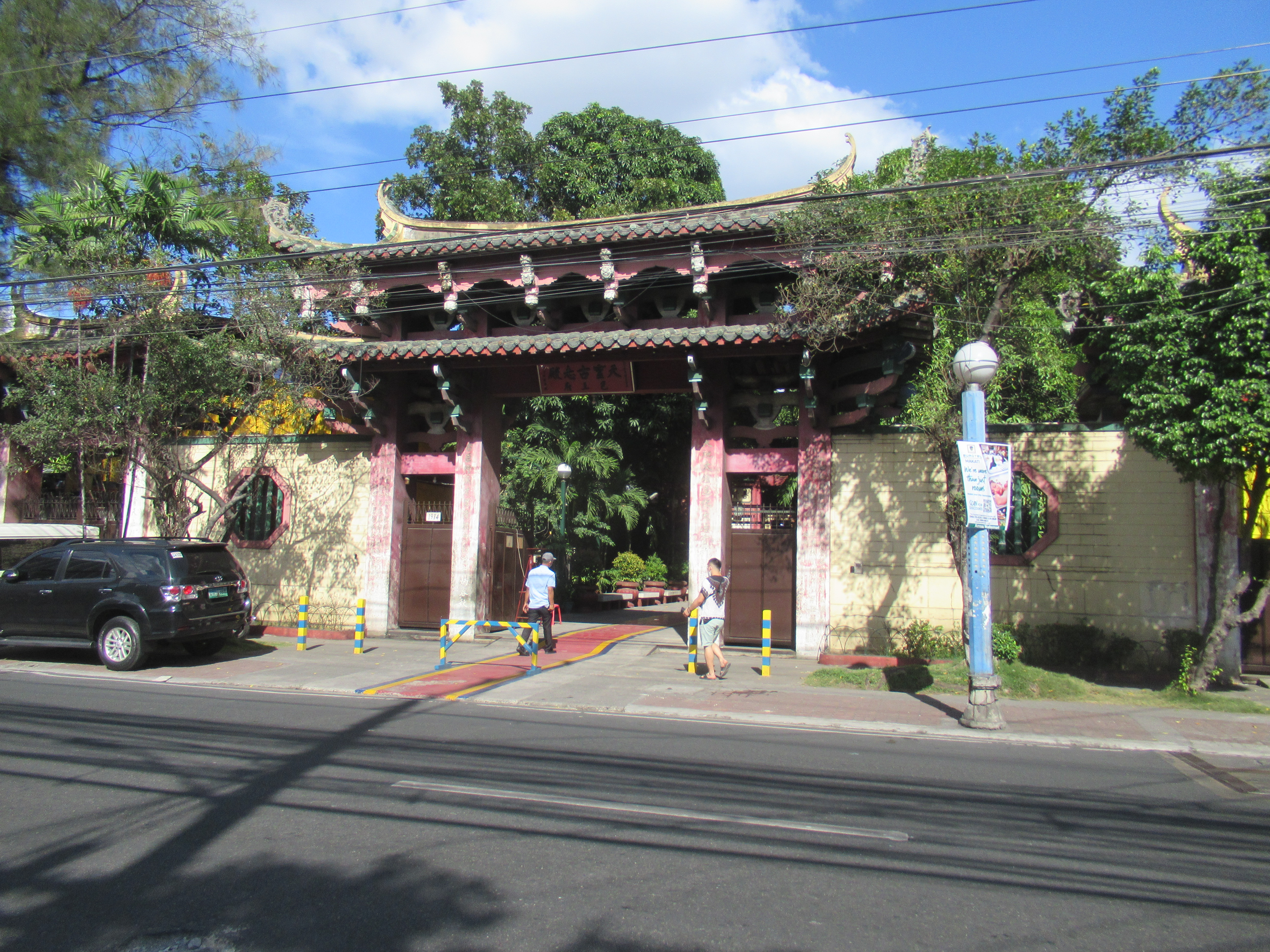
Pao Ong Kong Temple Pasay City (巴西巿包王府)

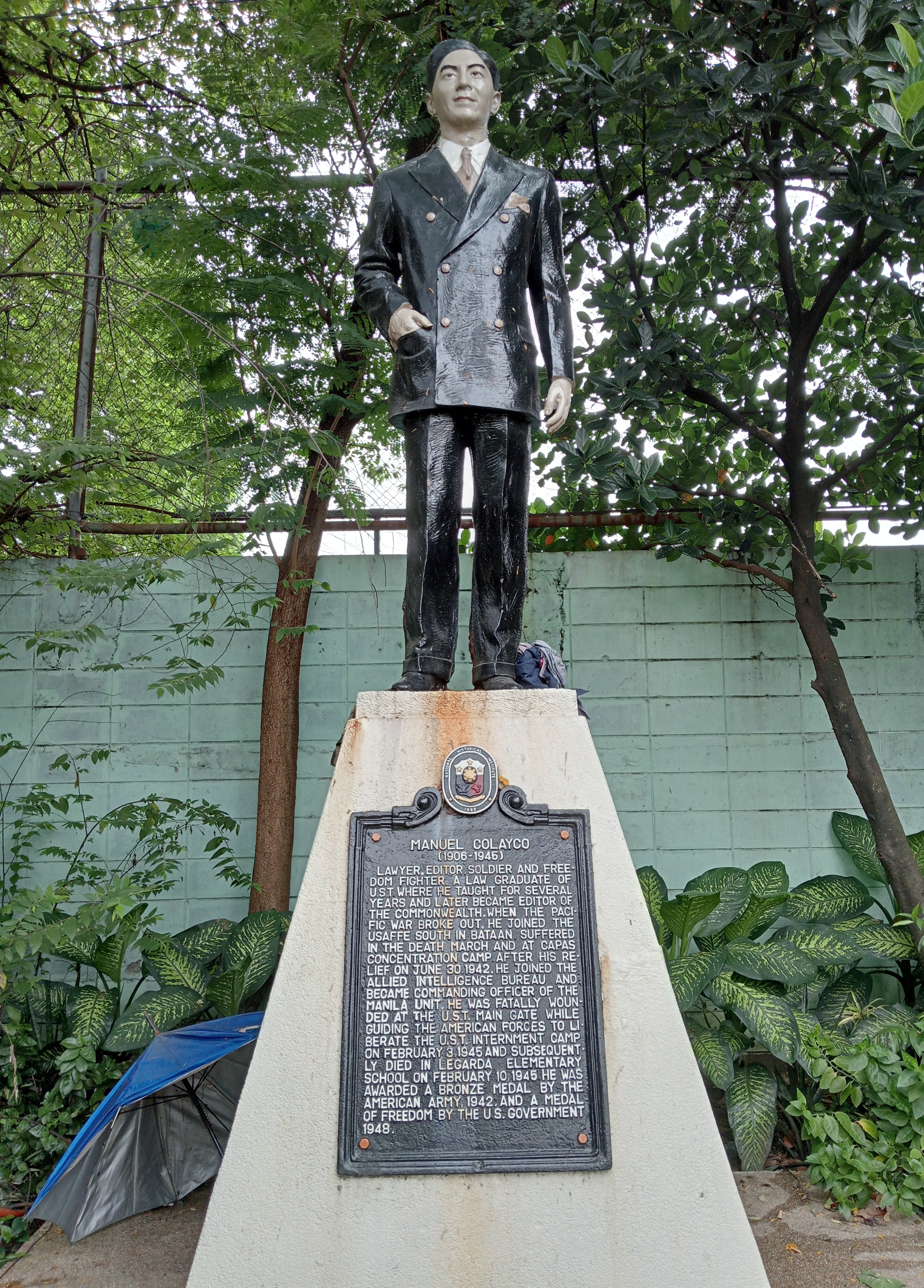
Manuel Colayco monument in Derham Park

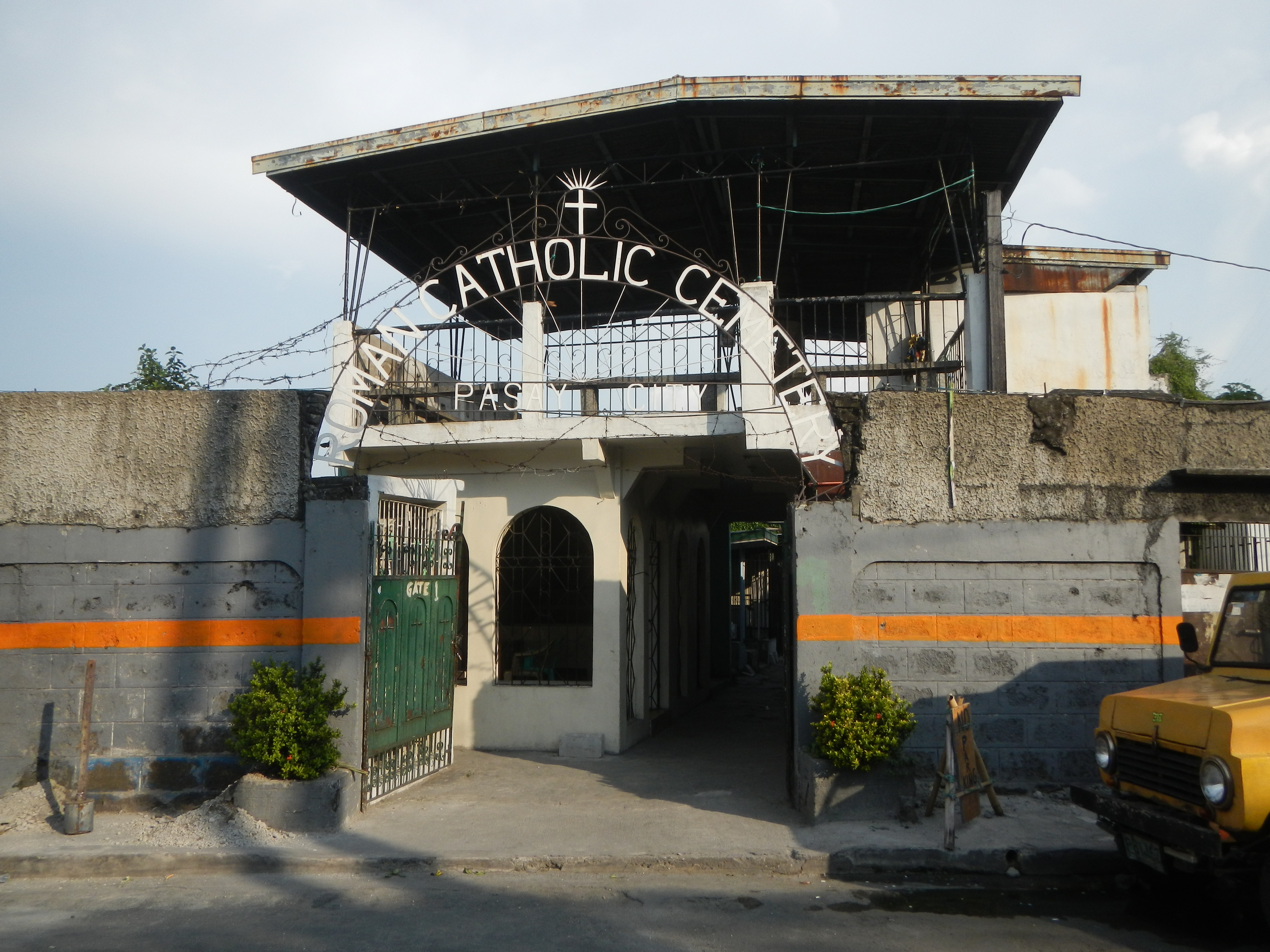
Roman Catholic Cemetery

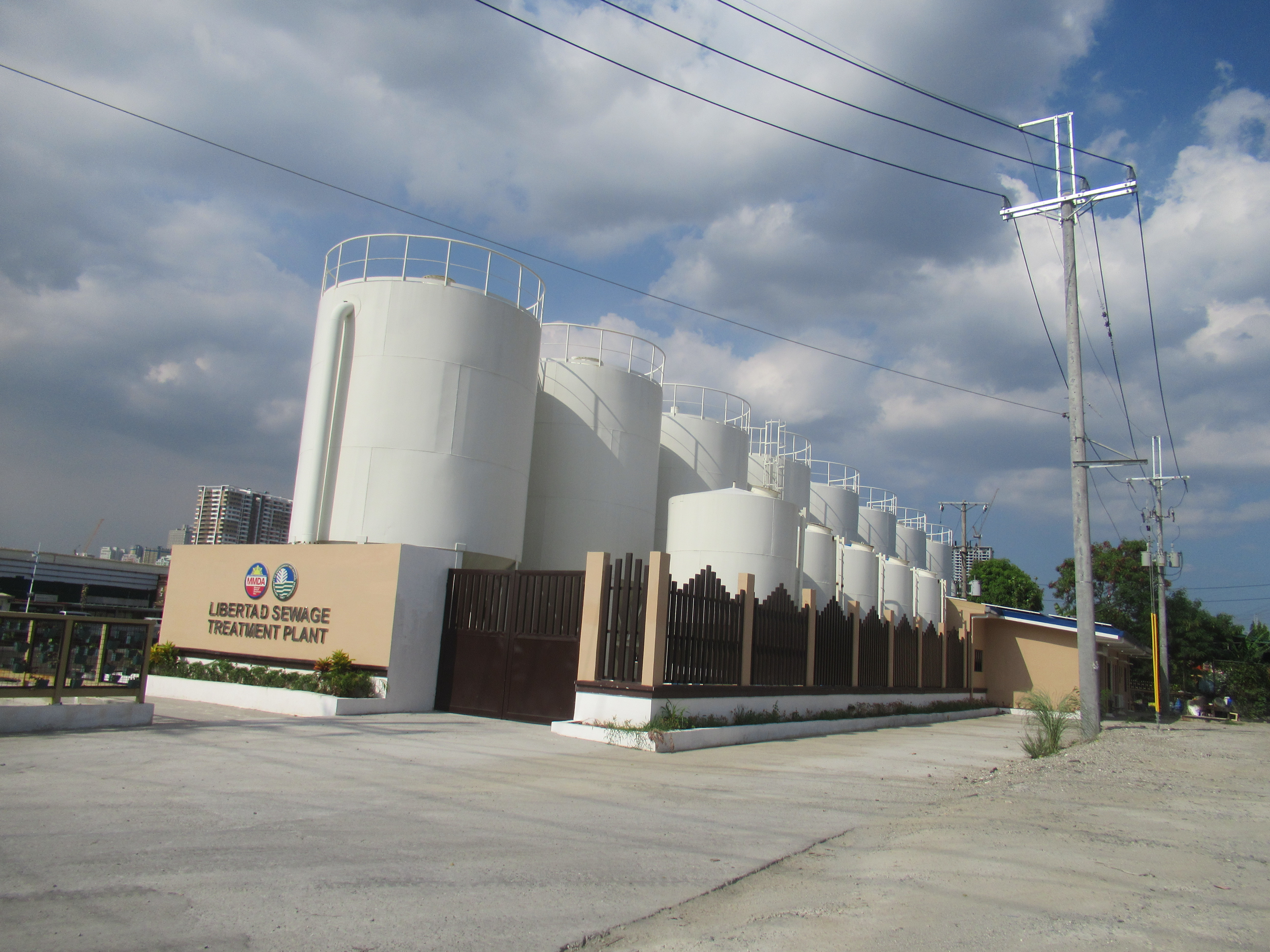
Libertad Sewage Treatment Plant

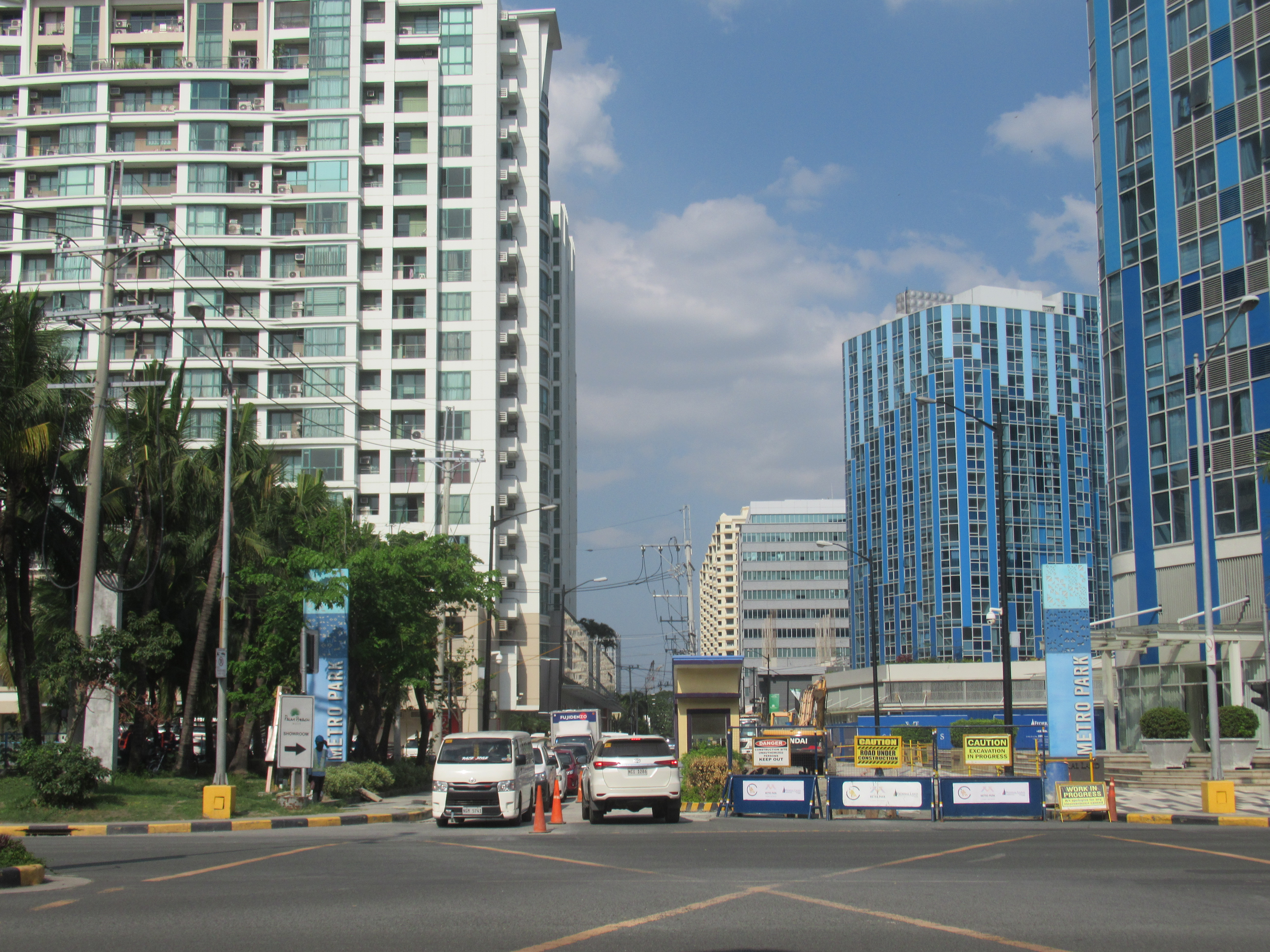
Metropolitan Park

== See also ==
- Cuneta Astrodome
- Bay City, Metro Manila
- Baclaran
