= E2 expressway (Philippines) =

Major road in Luzon, Philippines

Expressway 2

Route information
- Maintained by SMC Infrastructure
- Length: 103.7 km (64.4 mi)
- Existed: 2014–present

Main section
- North end: AH 26 (N1) (Epifanio de los Santos Avenue) / N145 (Osmeña Highway) in Makati; E1 (North Luzon Expressway) in Caloocan
- Major intersections: E6 (NAIA Expressway) in Taguig; N63 (Dr. Arcadio Santos Avenue) in Parañaque and Muntinlupa; N1 (Manila South Road) in Muntinlupa; E2 (Muntinlupa–Cavite Expressway) in Muntinlupa; N65 (Governor's Drive) in Carmona; E3 (Cavite–Laguna Expressway) in Biñan; N420 (Santa Rosa–Tagaytay Road) in Santa Rosa; N1 (Manila South Road) / AH 26 (N1) (Maharlika Highway) in Calamba; AH 26 (N1) (Maharlika Highway) in Santo Tomas; N421 (Tanauan–Talisay–Tagaytay Road) in Tanauan; N431-1 (Lipa–Balete Road) in Lipa; N4 (Jose P. Laurel Highway) in Lipa
- South end: N4 (Jose P. Laurel Highway) / N434 (Batangas Port Diversion Road) in Batangas City

Location
- Country: Philippines
- Regions: Metro Manila, Calabarzon

Highway system
- Roads in the Philippines; Highways; Expressways; List
← E1	→ E3

Expressway 2 (E2) forms part of the Philippine expressway network. Its main route runs from Makati to Santo Tomas as the South Luzon Expressway and from Santo Tomas to Batangas City as the STAR Tollway. It has spurs also signed as E2. South Luzon Expressway's section from Makati to Calamba, including the Skyway from Makati to Muntinlupa, is also part of AH26.

== Route description ==
=== Main route ===
==== South Luzon Expressway ====
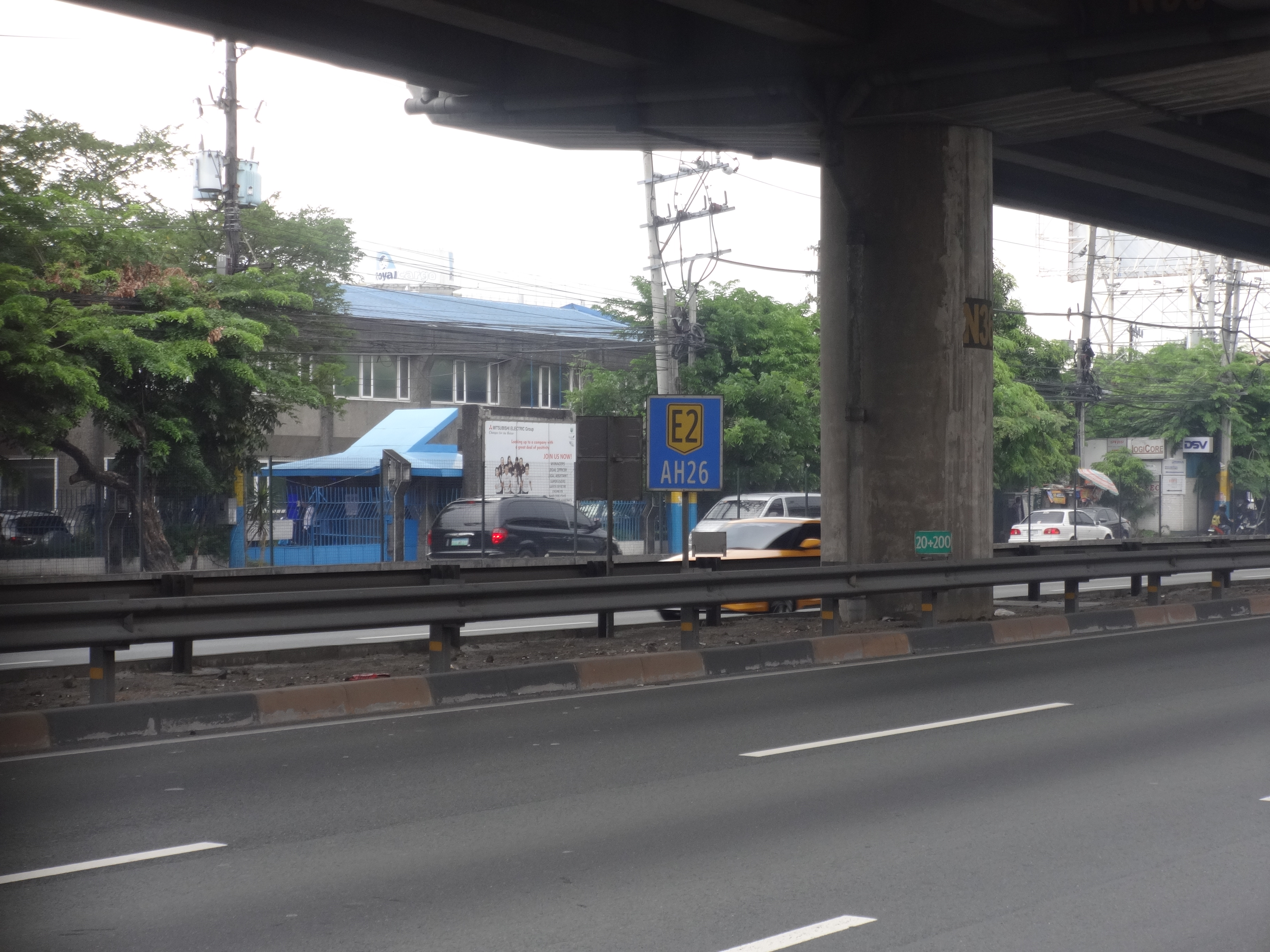
An E2/AH26 marker in Muntinlupa

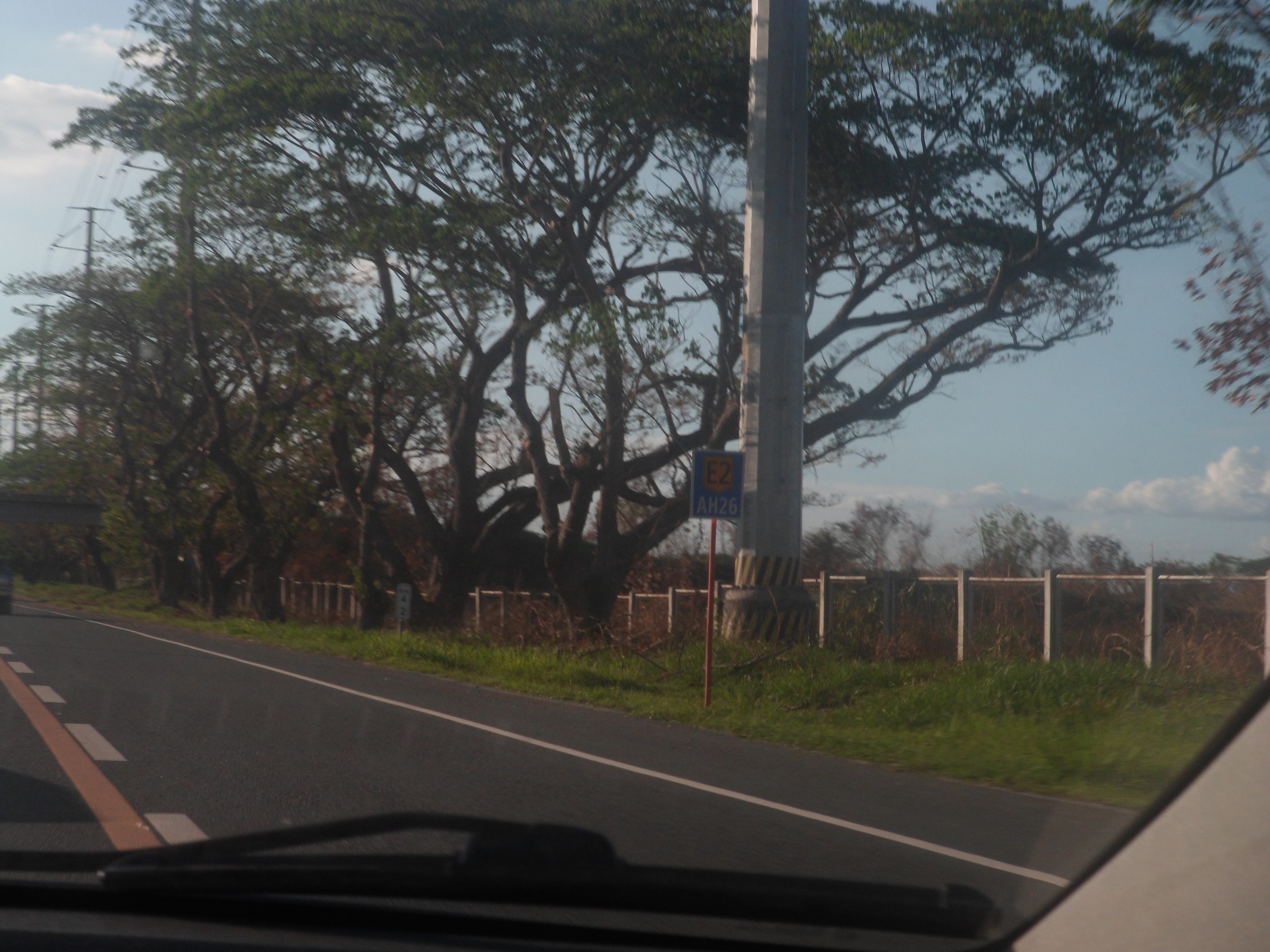
An E2/AH26 marker in Santa Rosa, Laguna

E2 starts at Magallanes Interchange in Makati as South Luzon Expressway. From Makati to Calamba, it is a part of Asian Highway 26 (AH26). It carries Skyway until it reaches Muntinlupa, where it ends as SLEX continues. Differing in concession holders, its section between Magallanes and Alabang Exit is also known as Skyway At-Grade, while the rest of the section takes the South Luzon Expressway concession branding. It parallels Manila South Road (N1) from Muntinlupa to Calamba until it reaches Calamba Exit, a partial cloverleaf interchange in Calamba where N1 takes the AH26 concurrency. It continues until it reaches Santo Tomas, which ends and becomes the STAR Tollway. However, a spur of SLEX will continue set to be part of E2.

==== Skyway ====
The extent of E2/AH26 on the Skyway is unknown since the Department of Public Works and Highways's ArcGIS app does not show any route designation for the elevated tollway. However, some E2/AH26 markers were seen exclusively on Skyway Stages 1 and 2, between Buendia Exit in Makati and South Station (Alabang–Zapote) Exit in Muntinlupa until they were dismantled together with the center barriers in 2020.

==== STAR Tollway ====
E2 continues as STAR Tollway at Santo Tomas Exit, an interchange with Maharlika Highway (N1) and SLEX in Santo Tomas, Batangas. It traverses from Santo Tomas to Batangas City, ending at a roundabout and four-way interchange with Jose P. Laurel Highway (N4) and Batangas Port Diversion Road (N434).

=== Spur routes ===
==== Muntinlupa–Cavite Expressway ====
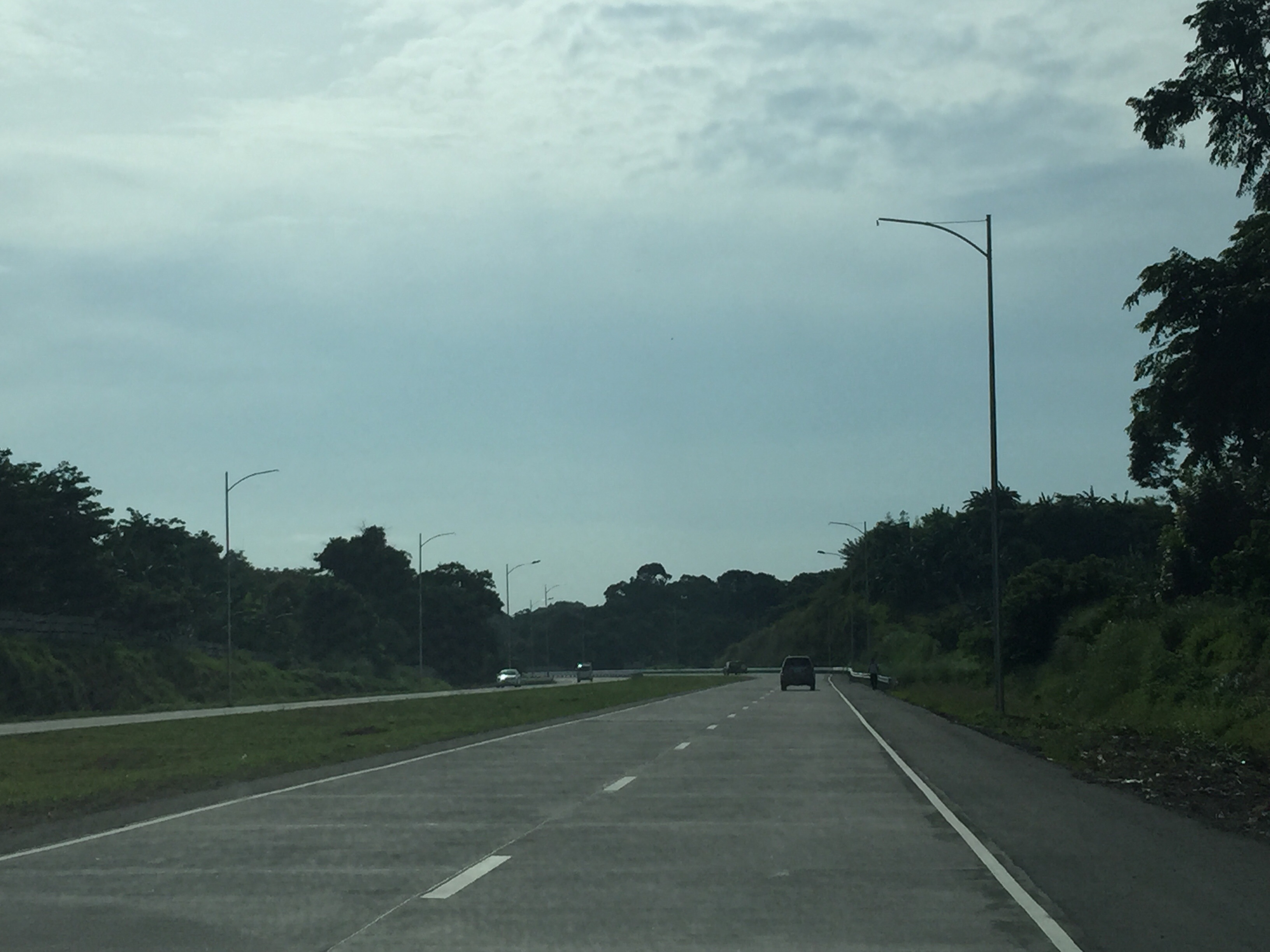
Muntinlupa–Cavite Expressway eastbound to Susana Heights Interchange

Muntinlupa–Cavite Expressway is a 4-kilometer (2.5 mi) expressway in Muntinlupa that connects SLEX and Daang Hari Road near Bacoor, Cavite. It is currently the shortest expressway in the Philippines.

==== NLEX Connector ====
A 7.7-kilometer (4.8 mi), four-lane elevated expressway that connects the NLEX Harbor Link to the Metro Manila Skyway. It traverses Manila and Caloocan. This serves as the northernmost spur of the E2 Expressway

== Exits ==
Exit numbers are based on kilometer posts, with Rizal Park in Manila designated as Kilometre Zero.

=== Metro Manila Skyway (Stages 1–3 & Extension) ===
Province	City/Municipality	km	mi	Exit	Name	Destinations	Notes
Caloocan – Malabon boundary					Balintawak (NLEX)	AH 26 (E1) (NLEX) – Tarlac, Baguio	Northbound exit and southbound entrance; northern terminus of the Skyway system; future link to Northern Access Link Expressway towards New Manila International Airport
Quezon City					A. Bonifacio (EDSA)	N160 (A. Bonifacio Avenue) – Balintawak	Northbound exit and southbound entrance
Quezon City					Sgt. Rivera (C-3/R-10)	N130 (5th Avenue) – Caloocan, R-10, Balintawak	Northbound exit, southbound entrance, and tolled southbound exit; includes northbound exit ramp to N130 (Sgt. Rivera Avenue) / N160 (A. Bonifacio Avenue); future link to Southern Access Link Expressway via C3–R10 Extension
Quezon City				Del Monte Toll Plaza			
Quezon City					G. Araneta (Maria Clara/Talayan)	N130 (G. Araneta Avenue) / Calamba Street	Northbound exit
Quezon City					Quezon Avenue	N130 (G. Araneta Avenue) / N170 (Quezon Avenue)	Tolled northbound exit, northbound entrance and southbound entrance; untolled southbound exit
Quezon City					G. Araneta (Araneta Avenue)	N130 (G. Araneta Avenue)	Southbound exit (formerly E. Rodriguez) and tolled northbound entrance; access to N180 (Aurora Boulevard & Magsaysay Boulevard)
Quezon City					Aurora Boulevard	G. Araneta Avenue	Future northbound entrance near N. Domingo Street, San Juan
Manila					Tomas Claudio		Link to NLEX Connector via elevated spur road
Manila					Nagtahan	N140 (Quirino Avenue) – Nagtahan	Tolled southbound exit and northbound entrance
Manila					Quirino (Pedro Gil)	N140 (Quirino Avenue) / N156 (Plaza Dilao Road) – Plaza Dilao	Tolled southbound exit; construction of ramp to N156 (Quirino Avenue Extension) suspended
Manila					Nagtahan	N140 (Quirino Avenue) – Nagtahan	Tolled northbound exit
Manila					Plaza Dilao	N140 (Quirino Avenue)	Tolled southbound entrance
Manila					Quirino	N140 (Quirino Avenue) / Pedro Gil Street – Santa Mesa, Roxas Boulevard	Tolled northbound exit, northbound entrance, and southbound entrance; southbound entrance from N145 (Osmeña Highway) construction pending; future link to Southern Access Link Expressway via Quirino Extension
Manila				Gil Puyat Toll Plaza B (southbound only) (Note: The toll plazas were planned as part of the original project. These were demolished in 2020, a few months before the opening of Skyway Stage 3. The former site of the southbound toll plazas later housed RFID installation lanes for northbound motorists.)			
Manila				Gil Puyat Toll Plaza A (southbound only)			
Makati		– 6	– 3.7		Buendia (Gil Puyat)	N145 (Osmeña Highway) / N190 (Gil Puyat Avenue)	Tolled northbound entrance and southbound exit (Zobel); untolled northbound exit and southbound entrance; northern end of AH26 concurrency; former northern terminus (1998-2020)
Makati		6.6– 6.7	4.1– 4.2		Amorsolo	Amorsolo Street	Northbound exit and southbound entrance; entrance ramp accessible via Arnaiz Avenue westbound
Makati		7.2	4.5		Don Bosco	N145 (Osmeña Highway) / Don Bosco Street	Northbound exit
Makati					EDSA	AH 26 (N1) (EDSA)	Future northbound entrance
Pasay – Taguig boundary		9.3	5.8		Magallanes	AH 26 (E2) (SLEX) – Magallanes	Northbound exit and southbound entrance
Taguig		9.6– 10.1	6.0– 6.3		NAIAX	E6 (NAIAX) – NAIA Terminals 1, 2, 3	Directional T interchange, part of Sales Interchange
Taguig		10.5	6.5	Skyway Toll Plaza A (1998–2011, demolished) (Note: Toll Plaza A served both directions while Toll Plaza B served northbound vehicles only.)			
Taguig		11.0	6.8	Runway Toll Plaza A (northbound only, pass-thru for northbound light vehicles) (2018–2020, demolished)			
Taguig		11.1	6.9	Runway Toll Plaza (Skyway/Runway Toll Plaza B) (Note: Runway Toll Plaza is previously known as Runway Toll Plaza B especially when it coexisted with the former Runway Toll Plaza A from 2018 to 2020. Previously, it was the site of the Skyway Toll Plaza B until 2011.) (northbound only, pass-thru and RFID installation and reloading station) (1998–2011, 2018–2025, demolished)			
Taguig – Parañaque boundary		11.9– 12.1	7.4– 7.5			E5 (SEMME) – TCITX, Arca South, Rizal	Future Skyway/FTI Interchange of SEMME; directional T interchange
Parañaque		13.4– 13.5	8.3– 8.4		Bicutan (Doña Soledad)	Doña Soledad Avenue	Tolled southbound exit and northbound entrance. Former southern terminus (1998-2010)
Parañaque		14.6	9.1			SLEX	Former southbound exit and northbound entrance (1998–2011), replaced by the Hillsborough ramps.
Parañaque – Muntinlupa boundary		17.5	10.9		Sucat (Dr. A. Santos)	N63 (Dr. A. Santos Avenue)	Tolled southbound exit and northbound entrance
Muntinlupa		19.0	11.8	Skyway Main Toll Plaza Southbound (permanently closed in 2015)			
Muntinlupa		19.1	11.9	Skyway Main Toll Plaza Bravo			
Muntinlupa		19.5	12.1		Hillsborough	AH 26 (E2) (SLEX) – Calamba	Northbound entrance (2011–2020) and southbound exit (2011–2021), replaced by the Skyway Extension Project
Muntinlupa		21.1	13.1	South Station (Alabang) Toll Plaza (2011–2020, demolished)			
Muntinlupa						AH 26 (E2) (SLEX)	Skyway-Alabang Viaduct Connecting Ramp; future northbound entrance to be built from the shoulder of Alabang Viaduct
Muntinlupa		21.33	13.25			AH 26 (E2) (SLEX) – Calamba	Temporary southbound exit and northbound entrance during the construction of Extension Project (2019–2021)
Muntinlupa		21.6	13.4		South Station (Alabang-Zapote / Bunye)	N411 (Alabang–Zapote Road) – South Station, Las Piñas	Tolled southbound exit and northbound entrance; former southern terminus (2010–2021)
Muntinlupa		23.416– 23.447	14.550– 14.569		SLEX Elevated Extension	AH 26 (E2) (SLEX) – Laguna, Batangas, Quezon	Untolled northbound entrance and southbound exit; southern terminus of the Skyway system
1.000 mi = 1.609 km; 1.000 km = 0.621 mi: Closed/former; Concurrency terminus; Incomplete access; Tolled; Unopened

=== Skyway Stage 3–NLEX Connector link ===
The entire route is located in Manila. Referred to as Sections 2A' (Tomas Claudio – PUP, Sta. Mesa) or as part of Section 1A - 2 (Plaza Berde – PUP campus) of Skyway Stage 3, this 1.2-kilometer (0.75 mi) segment of Skyway will link the main line of Skyway Stage 3 near Tomas Claudio Street (Nagtahan Link Bridge) and NLEX Connector near the Polytechnic University of the Philippines (PUP) campus in Santa Mesa.

km	mi	Exit	Name	Destinations	Notes
			Tomas Claudio	Skyway – Makati, NAIA, Alabang	Southern terminus of the spur. Connection to the main line of Skyway.
				N141 (Valenzuela Street) – Santa Mesa	Northbound exit and southbound entry; under planning and for approval
				NLEX Connector – Caloocan, Navotas, Valenzuela	Northern terminus of the spur. Continues north as NLEX Connector.
1.000 mi = 1.609 km; 1.000 km = 0.621 mi: Unopened

=== South Luzon Expressway & STAR Tollway Main Line (Magallanes to Batangas City) ===
Exits are numbered by kilometer posts, with Rizal Park in Manila designated as kilometer zero. Exits are mostly named and numbered, but exit numbers appear only after the Alabang Exit. There is a discrepancy in mileage, with kilometer 24 being kilometer 23 on the Manila Toll Expressway Systems (MATES)–maintained segments of the expressway. No tolls are paid on the section north of the Nichols Toll Plaza.

Region	Province	City/Municipality	km	mi	Exit	Name	Destinations	Notes
Metro Manila	Makati		8	5.0			AH 26 (N1) (EDSA) – Cubao, Pasay	Magallanes Interchange; north end of AH26 concurrency; northern terminus; continues north to Manila as N145 (Osmeña Highway)
Metro Manila	Makati		8.2	5.1			San Gregorio Street	Southbound access only
Metro Manila	Makati		8.33	5.18				Southbound entry only, from Paseo de Magallanes
Metro Manila	Makati		8.43	5.24				Southbound access only; near Honda Cars Makati
Metro Manila	Makati		8.67	5.39			Magallanes Avenue	Southbound access only
Metro Manila	Makati		8.7	5.4	Caltex service station (southbound)			
Metro Manila	Pasay – Taguig boundary		8.9– 9.0	5.5– 5.6			AH 26 (E2) (Skyway)	Magallanes Exit of Skyway; southbound exit and northbound entrance
Metro Manila	Pasay		9.6– 9.8	6.0– 6.1		Nichols	N192 (Sales Road) / Lawton Avenue – Airport, Villamor Airbase, BGC	Partial cloverleaf interchange, part of Sales Interchange
Metro Manila	Pasay				North end of expressway restrictions			
Metro Manila	Pasay		10.15	6.31	Nichols Toll Plaza B (northbound only)			
Metro Manila	Pasay		10.3	6.4	Nichols Toll Plaza A (northbound only)			
Metro Manila	Pasay		10.9	6.8		Merville	C-5 Road Extension / West Service Road – Merville	Southbound exit only
Metro Manila	Pasay		11	6.8	Nichols Toll Plaza A (southbound only)			
Metro Manila	Pasay		11.1	6.9	Nichols Toll Plaza B (southbound only)			
Metro Manila	Pasay – Taguig boundary		11.5– 11.7	7.1– 7.3		C-5 (C-5 - Taguig)	N11 (Carlos P. Garcia Avenue) – Pasig, Taguig	Northbound exit and southbound entrance
Metro Manila	Parañaque		14– 14.4	8.7– 8.9		Bicutan	Doña Soledad Avenue – Bicutan	Diamond interchange
Metro Manila	Parañaque		15	9.3			Skyway	Former northbound exit and southbound entrance (1998–2011)
Metro Manila	Parañaque – Muntinlupa boundary		17.7– 18.0	11.0– 11.2		Sucat	N63 (Dr. A. Santos Avenue) – Sucat, BF Homes	Diamond interchange
Metro Manila	Muntinlupa		19.4	12.1		Alabang	East Service Road	Temporary northbound entrance during the construction of Skyway/SLEX Elevated Extension Project
Metro Manila	Muntinlupa		19.7	12.2			AH 26 (E2) (Skyway)	Hillsborough on- and off-ramp of Skyway; former northbound exit (2011–2020) and southbound entrance (2011–2021)
Metro Manila	Muntinlupa		19.6	12.2		Alabang	East Service Road	Temporary northbound entrance to SLEX and on to Skyway during the construction of Skyway/SLEX Elevated Extension Project (2019–2020)
Metro Manila	Muntinlupa		21.3	13.2		South Station	South Station, Filinvest City	Southbound exit only; considered as part of Alabang Exit on the toll matrix
Metro Manila	Muntinlupa		21.3	13.2		Alabang	N1 (Manila South Road) / N411 (Alabang–Zapote Road) / N142 (Montillano Street) – Alabang	Southbound exit and northbound entrance. Former southern terminus (1969–1978)
Metro Manila	Muntinlupa		21.3	13.2	North end of Alabang Viaduct; Maintenance transition from Skyway Operations and Maintenance Corporation (SOMCO) to Manila Toll Expressway Systems, Inc. (MATES)			
Metro Manila	Muntinlupa				Manila South Expressway: Alabang Toll Plaza (1969–1978; demolished)			
Metro Manila	Muntinlupa		21.4	13.3			Skyway	Temporary southbound entrance and northbound exit during the construction of Skyway/SLEX Elevated Extension (2019–2021)
Metro Manila	Muntinlupa		21.5	13.4			Skyway	Future permanent northbound exit to be built on the shoulder of Alabang Viaduct
Metro Manila	Muntinlupa		22.4	13.9	South end of Alabang Viaduct			
Metro Manila	Muntinlupa		22.4– 23	13.9– 14	23	Filinvest (Alabang)	Corporate Avenue / Filinvest Avenue – Filinvest City, Las Piñas	Trumpet interchange
Metro Manila	Muntinlupa		23	14		Alabang	N1 (Manila South Road) – Alabang, Bayanan.	Northbound exit and southbound entrance; toll booths for southbound entry moved to dedicated booths shared with Alabang Exit.
Metro Manila	Muntinlupa		23.5– 23.6	14.6– 14.7			SLEX Elevated Extension (Skyway Extension)	Northbound exit and southbound entrance
Metro Manila	Muntinlupa		23.7	14.7	Caltex service area (northbound only, demolished)			
Metro Manila	Muntinlupa		24.7	15.3	Shell service area (southbound)			
Metro Manila	Muntinlupa		25.5– 26.45	15.8– 16.44	26	MCX / Villar City (Susana Heights)	E2 (MCX) / Susana Heights Access Road – Daang Hari, Villar City, Susana Heights, Muntinlupa	Hybrid trumpet and directional T interchange
Calabarzon	Laguna	San Pedro	27.5	17.1	27	San Pedro	San Antonio Drive / Ynion Drive / Magsaysay Road – San Pedro, La Marea	Folded diamond interchange
Calabarzon	Laguna	San Pedro	29	18	Petron service area (southbound)			
Calabarzon	Laguna	San Pedro	29	18	Caltex service area (northbound)			
Calabarzon	Laguna	Biñan	31.2– 31.9	19.4– 19.8	31	Southwoods	Southwoods Avenue / Enterprise Avenue – Southwoods City, Biñan	Folded diamond interchange
Calabarzon	Cavite	Carmona	33.3– 33.47	20.7– 20.80	33	Carmona	N65 (Governor's Drive) – Carmona, Biñan, Dasmariñas	Trumpet interchange
Calabarzon	Laguna	Biñan	35	22	Shell service area (northbound)			
Calabarzon	Laguna	Biñan	35.6– 35.7	22.1– 22.2	36	Mamplasan	E3 (CALAX) / Greenfield Parkway / LIIP Avenue – Greenfield City, LIIP, SRIT	Folded diamond interchange
Calabarzon	Laguna	Biñan	37	23	Caltex service area (southbound)			
Calabarzon	Laguna	Santa Rosa	37.8– 38.5	23.5– 23.9	38	Santa Rosa	N420 (Santa Rosa–Tagaytay Road) – Santa Rosa, Tagaytay	Folded diamond interchange
Calabarzon	Laguna	Santa Rosa	40.5	25.2	Total (SLEX) service area (northbound)			
Calabarzon	Laguna	Santa Rosa	42.2	26.2	41	Asia Brewery International / Eton City (Malitlit)	Eton City, Malitlit, Greenfield City, Tagaytay	Double right-in/right-out interchange
Calabarzon	Laguna	Cabuyao	43.4– 44.0	27.0– 27.3	43	Cabuyao	Pulo–Diezmo Road – Cabuyao, Sta. Elena City	Folded diamond interchange
Calabarzon	Laguna	Calamba	44.5	27.7	Petron KM 44 Southbound			
Calabarzon	Laguna	Calamba	44.5	27.7	Petron KM 44 Northbound			
Calabarzon	Laguna	Calamba	45.0– 45.35	28.0– 28.18	45	Silangan	Silangan Access Road – Silangan, Carmeltown	Folded diamond interchange
Calabarzon	Laguna	Calamba	46.6	29.0		Equus City		Right-in/right-out exit at northbound still fenced
Calabarzon	Laguna	Calamba	47.5	29.5	Calamba Toll Plaza A (2009–2024; demolished)			
Calabarzon	Laguna	Calamba	47.7	29.6	Calamba Toll Plaza (1978–2009; demolished)			
Calabarzon	Laguna	Calamba	47.75	29.67	Calamba Toll Plaza B (2009–2024; demolished, southbound only)			
Calabarzon	Laguna	Calamba	47.3– 47.65	29.4– 29.61	47	Canlubang (Mayapa)	N420-1 (Mayapa–Canlubang Cadre Road) – Canlubang, Mayapa	Folded diamond interchange
Calabarzon	Laguna	Calamba	48.85	30.35	49	Batino	Batino, CPIP, Tagaytay Highlands, Ciudad de Calamba	Right-in/right-out exit and entrance at southbound.
Calabarzon	Laguna	Calamba	49.8– 50.1	30.9– 31.1	50	Calamba (Turbina-Real)	AH 26 (N1) (Maharlika Highway) – Turbina, Real, Makiling, Los Baños, Calauan	Half diamond interchange (north half), and partial cloverleaf interchange (south half); south end of AH26 concurrency. Former southern terminus (1978–2010).
Calabarzon	Laguna	Calamba				Ayala Greenfield	Ayala Greenfield Estates	Construction to begin November 2024.
Calabarzon	Laguna	Calamba	52.64	32.71	Ayala Greenfield Estate (Saimsim) Toll Plaza A (2010–2024; demolished, southbound only)			
Calabarzon	Laguna	Calamba	52.8	32.8	Ayala Greenfield Estate (Saimsim) Toll Plaza B (2010–2024; demolished, northbound only)			
Calabarzon	Laguna	Calamba	55	34		Santo Tomas Interchange	SLEX Toll Road 4	Connection with the future SLEX Toll Roads 4 and 5; trumpet interchange
Calabarzon	Batangas	Santo Tomas	57.4	35.7		Santo Tomas	AH 26 (N1) (Maharlika Highway) – Santo Tomas, Calamba, San Pablo, Quezon, Lucena, Camarines Sur, Albay, Sorsogon, Matnog, Visayas	Folded diamond interchange; route transitions directly from SLEX to STAR Tollway
Calabarzon	Batangas	Santo Tomas	Tanauan	61	38	Santo Tomas toll plaza (2010–2025; demolished)		
Calabarzon	Batangas	65	Tanauan	40		Tanauan City (Sambat)	N421 (Tanauan–Talisay National Road) – Tanauan, Talisay, Laurel, Tagaytay	Diamond interchange
Calabarzon	Batangas	Malvar	70	43		Malvar (Bulihan)	Balete–Malvar Provincial Road / Pedro Montecer Street – Malvar, Balete	Diamond interchange
Calabarzon	Batangas	Malvar	75	47	Petron KM 75 service area (southbound only)			
Calabarzon	Batangas	Lipa				Bugtong Na Pulo	Bugtong Na Pulo Interchange Access Road – LIMA Estate	Half partial cloverleaf (west half), and half diamond interchange (east half)
Calabarzon	Batangas	Lipa	78	48		Santo Toribio (Balete / F. Leviste Highway)	N431-1 (F. Leviste Highway) – Balete	Diamond interchange
Calabarzon	Batangas	Lipa	79	49	Petron STAR Tollway service area (northbound only)			
Calabarzon	Batangas	Lipa	82	51		Lipa City (Tambo)	N4 (Jose P. Laurel Highway) – Lipa, Cuenca, Alitagtag, Mataasnakahoy	Folded diamond interchange; former southern terminus (2000–2008)
Calabarzon	Batangas	Lipa	86	53	Petron KM 86 service area (northbound only)			
Calabarzon	Batangas	Ibaan	93	58		Ibaan (Malainin)	San Jose-Ibaan Road – Ibaan, San Jose, Quezon, Lucena, Camarines Sur, Albay, Sorsogon, Matnog, Visayas	Diamond interchange
Calabarzon	Batangas	Ibaan – Batangas City boundary	99	62	Sabang Bridge			
Calabarzon	Batangas	Batangas City				Tinga	N435 (Batangas–Ibaan Road) / STAR Tollway-Pinamucan Bypass	Future trumpet interchange
Calabarzon	Batangas	Batangas City	101	63	Batangas (Balagtas) toll plaza			
Calabarzon	Batangas	Batangas City	102	63		Batangas (Balagtas)	N4 (Jose P. Laurel Highway) / N434 (Batangas Port Diversion Road) / Batangas–Balete Road – Batangas City, Batangas Port	Roundabout; southern terminus
Calabarzon	Batangas	1.000 mi = 1.609 km; 1.000 km = 0.621 mi: Closed/former; Concurrency terminus; Incomplete access; Tolled; Unopened						

=== Muntinlupa–Cavite Expressway (MCX Spur) ===
Region	Province	City/Municipality	km	mi	Exit	Name	Destinations	Notes
Metro Manila	Muntinlupa		32.20	20.01		SLEX Interchange	E2 (South Luzon Expressway) / AH 26 (26) – Manila, Calamba	Eastern terminus of MCX; trumpet interchange with SLEX (E2)
Metro Manila	Muntinlupa		33.50	20.82	MCX Main Toll Plaza			
Metro Manila	Muntinlupa		36.20	22.49		Susana Heights / Daang Hari	Daang Hari Road / Susana Heights Access Road	Western terminus at-grade signalized intersection leading to Las Piñas and Cavite
1.000 mi = 1.609 km; 1.000 km = 0.621 mi: Tolled

=== NLEX Connector (E5 Spur) ===
Region	Province	City/Municipality	km	mi	Exit	Name	Destinations	Notes
Metro Manila	Caloocan		12.10	7.52		Caloocan Interchange	E1 (North Luzon Expressway) / E5 (NLEX Harbor Link)	Northern terminus of NLEX Connector; trumpet interchange with NLEX Segment 10 / Harbor Link (E5)
Metro Manila	Manila		14.50	9.01		España	N170 (España Boulevard)	Ramps serving Sampaloc and University Belt
Metro Manila	Manila		16.20	10.07		Magsaysay	N180 (Magsaysay Boulevard)	Ramps serving Santa Mesa and San Miguel
Metro Manila	Manila		17.50	10.87	España / Plaza Dilao Toll Plazas			
Metro Manila	Manila		18.30	11.37		Skyway Stage 3 Interchange	E2 (Metro Manila Skyway) – Makati, Pasay	Southern terminus; direct elevated interchange with Skyway Stage 3 (E2) near Plaza Dilao / Sta. Mesa
1.000 mi = 1.609 km; 1.000 km = 0.621 mi: Tolled

== See also ==
- South Luzon Expressway
- STAR Tollway
