= South Luzon Expressway =

Major controlled-access highway in the Philippines

R-3 South Luzon Expressway
- South Superhighway
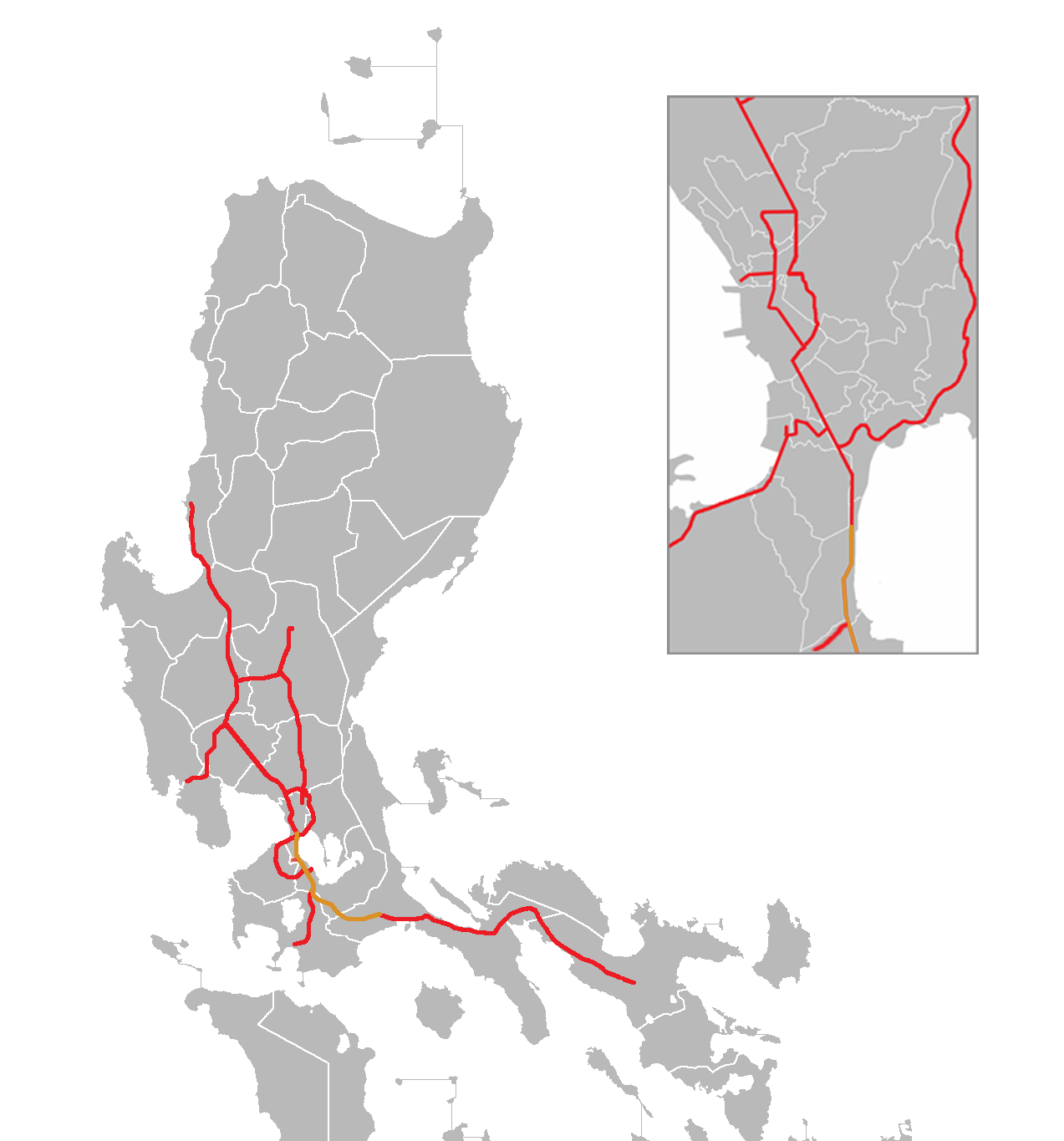
- Map of expressways in Luzon, with the South Luzon Expressway in orange

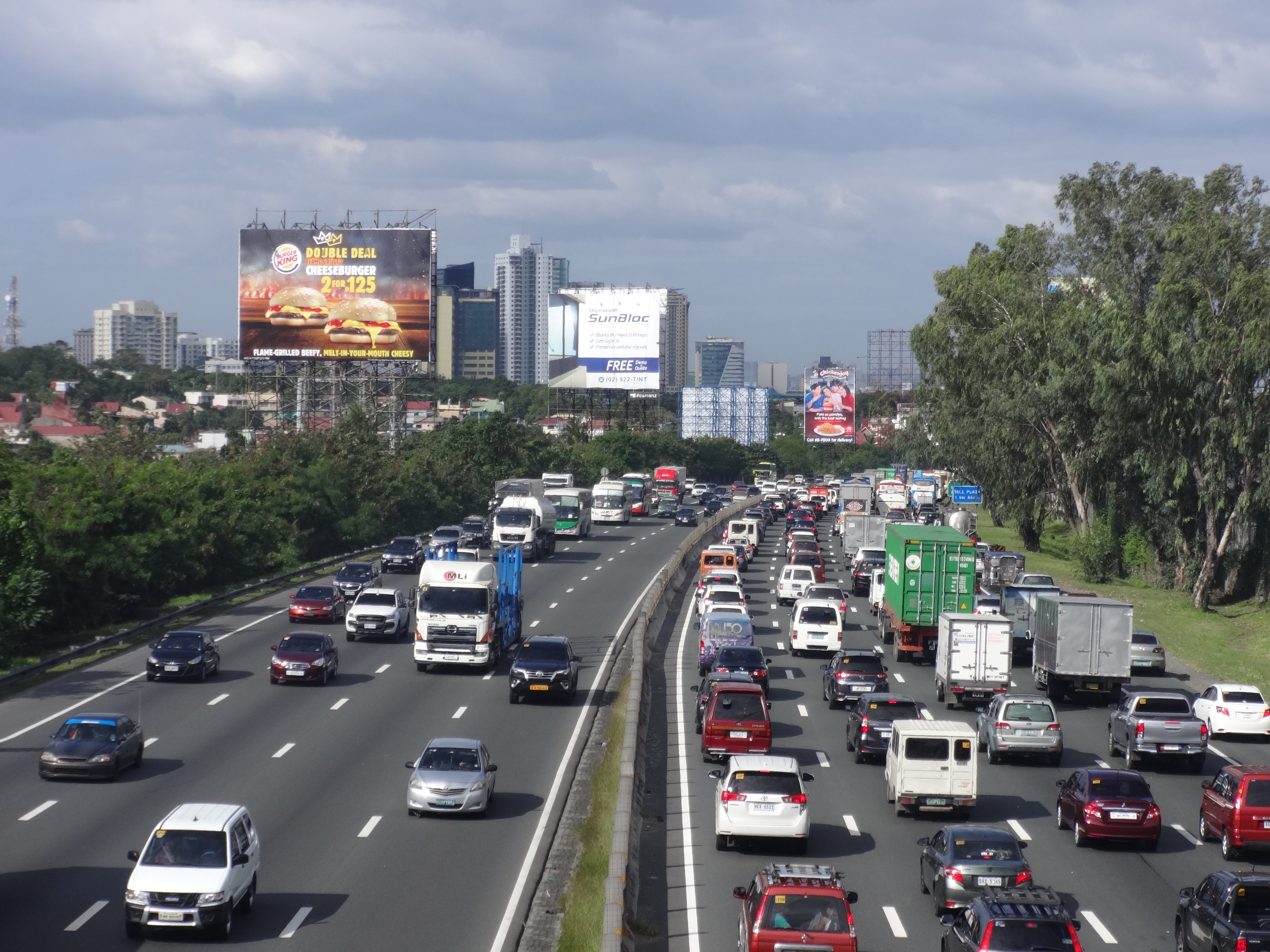
- The expressway in Putatan, Muntinlupa

Route information
- Part of AH26
- Maintained by Skyway Operations and Maintenance Corporation (Note: Skyway Operations and Maintenance Corporation (SOMCO) maintains the segment of SLEX from Magallanes Interchange in Makati to Alabang Exit in Muntinlupa, also known as Skyway At-Grade.) and Manila Toll Expressway Systems, Inc. (Note: Manila Toll Expressway Systems, Inc. (MATES) maintains the segment of SLEX from Alabang Viaduct in Muntinlupa to Santo Tomas, Batangas, including the segment also known as South Luzon Tollway (SLT) and Alabang–Calamba–Santo Tomas Expressway (ACTEX), as well as the future SLEX Toll Road 4 towards Lucena, Quezon and SLEX Toll Road 5 towards Matnog, Sorsogon.)
- Length: 49.56 km (30.80 mi) Operational sections only: Skyway At-Grade (Magallanes to Alabang) – 13.43 km (8.35 mi); Toll Road 1 (Alabang Viaduct) – 1.242 km (0.772 mi); Toll Road 2 (Filinvest–Calamba) – 27.289 km (16.957 mi); Toll Road 3 (Calamba–Santo Tomas) – 7.601 km (4.723 mi)
- Existed: 1969–present
- Component highways: E2; AH26 from Makati to Calamba
- Restrictions: No motorcycles, bicycles, tricycles and animal-drawn vehicles south of Sales Interchange

Major junctions
- North end: AH26 (EDSA) / N145 (Osmeña Highway) in Makati
- N63 (Dr. Santos Avenue) in Parañaque and Muntinlupa; N1 (Manila South Road) in Muntinlupa; E2 (Muntinlupa–Cavite Expressway) in Muntinlupa; N65 (Governor's Drive) in Carmona; E3 (Cavite–Laguna Expressway) in Biñan; N420 (Santa Rosa–Tagaytay Road) in Santa Rosa; N420-1 (Mayapa–Canlubang Cadre Road) in Calamba; AH26 (Maharlika Highway) / N1 (Manila South Road) in Calamba
- South end: E2 (STAR Tollway) in Santo Tomas; Future: AH26 (Lucena Diversion Road) in Lucena, Quezon

Location
- Country: Philippines
- Regions: Calabarzon and Metro Manila
- Provinces: Batangas, Cavite, and Laguna
- Major cities: Biñan, Cabuyao, Calamba, Carmona, Makati, Muntinlupa, Parañaque, Pasay, San Pedro, Santa Rosa, Santo Tomas, and Taguig

Highway system
- Roads in the Philippines; Highways; Expressways; List

The South Luzon Expressway (SLEX), (Note: The South Luzon Expressway is also known by its alternative and former names: the South Superhighway (SSH), the South Luzon Tollway (SLT), the Manila South Diversion Road (MSDR), and the Manila South Expressway (MSEX).) signed as E2 of the Philippine expressway network and R-3 of the Metro Manila arterial road network, is a controlled-access highway that connects Metro Manila to the provinces in the Calabarzon, Mimaropa and Bicol Region on the island of Luzon in the Philippines. The expressway has a length of 49.56 km (30.80 miles), traveling from its northern terminus at the Magallanes Interchange in Makati to its southern terminus at Santo Tomas, Batangas, connecting it to the Southern Tagalog Arterial Road (STAR Tollway). A portion of the expressway from the Magallanes Interchange to the Calamba Exit is part of Asian Highway 26 of the Asian highway network. It will be the longest expressway in the Philippines starting with the completion of Toll Road 4 surpassing the Subic–Clark–Tarlac Expressway (SCTEX) as well as providing a gateway to Visayas upon the completion of Toll Road 5.

The expressway also serves as a major utility corridor, carrying various high voltage overhead power lines and an oil pipeline. Notable power lines using the expressway's right of way for most or part of their route are the Sucat–Paco–Araneta–Balintawak transmission line, and the Biñan–Calamba and Calamba–Bay lines. The Magallanes–Alabang section of the expressway was also used to carry the Batangas–Pandacan oil pipeline. It is also one of the four expressways serving as the airplanes' northbound airway of domestic flights leading to Ninoy Aquino International Airport (NAIA) coming from Visayas and Mindanao along with STAR Tollway, Manila–Cavite Expressway (CAVITEX), and Metro Manila Skyway.

The expressway was built in 1969 to develop areas adjacent to Metro Manila, particularly the south. The original route spanning from Magallanes, Makati, to Alabang, Muntinlupa, was extended to Laguna in 1978. In 1995, the Magallanes–Alabang section became part of the Skyway System's at-grade section. Rehabilitation efforts on the expressway followed, lasting from 2006 to 2009.

Additionally, it is connected to the Southern Tagalog Arterial Road in Batangas since the second quarter of 2008 when the Toll Road 3 project (Calamba–Santo Tomas) reached the said expressway. The connection started construction in 2007 concurrent to the 3-year 2006–2009 rehabilitation of existing portions of the expressway until Calamba, Laguna, inaugurated on June 15, 2010, and opened to the traffic six months after its inauguration on December 15, 2010. Operations were transferred from Philippine National Construction Corporation (PNCC) to the South Luzon Tollways Corporation (SLTC) and Manila Toll Expressway Systems (MATES) on May 2, 2010.

== Route description ==
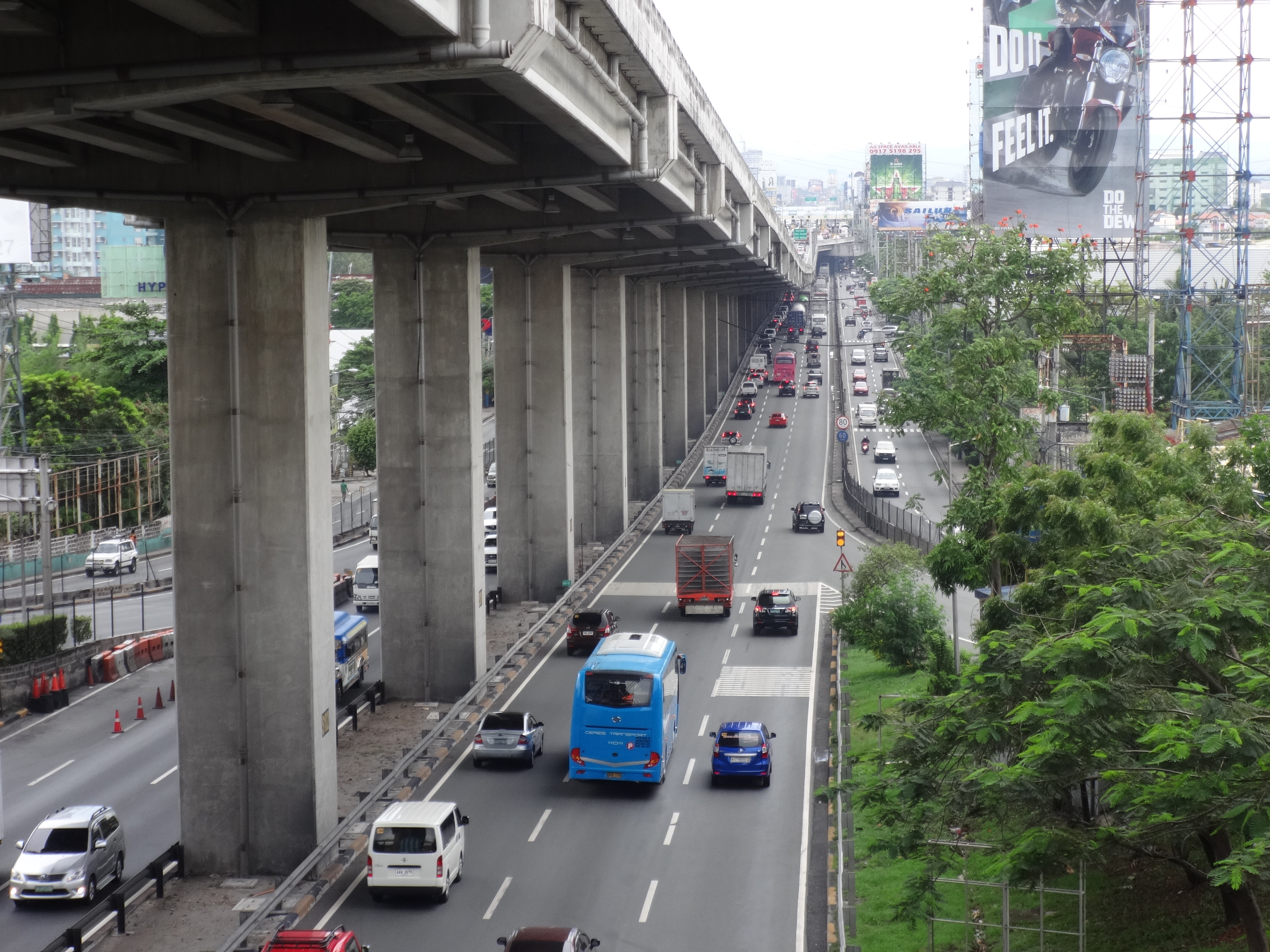
Skyway At-Grade southbound below Skyway in Muntinlupa

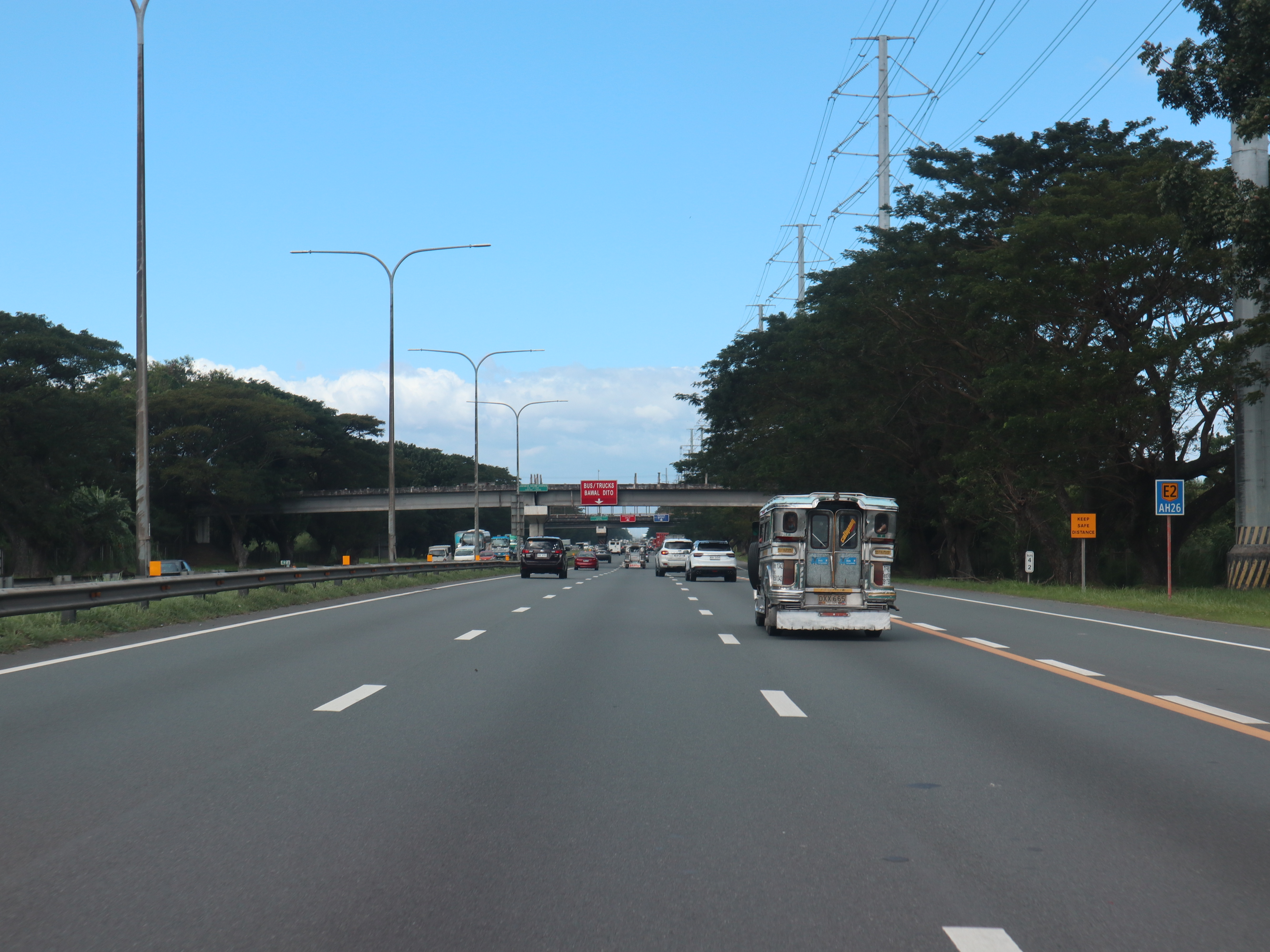
SLEX northbound in Santa Rosa, with the E2/AH26 reassurance marker

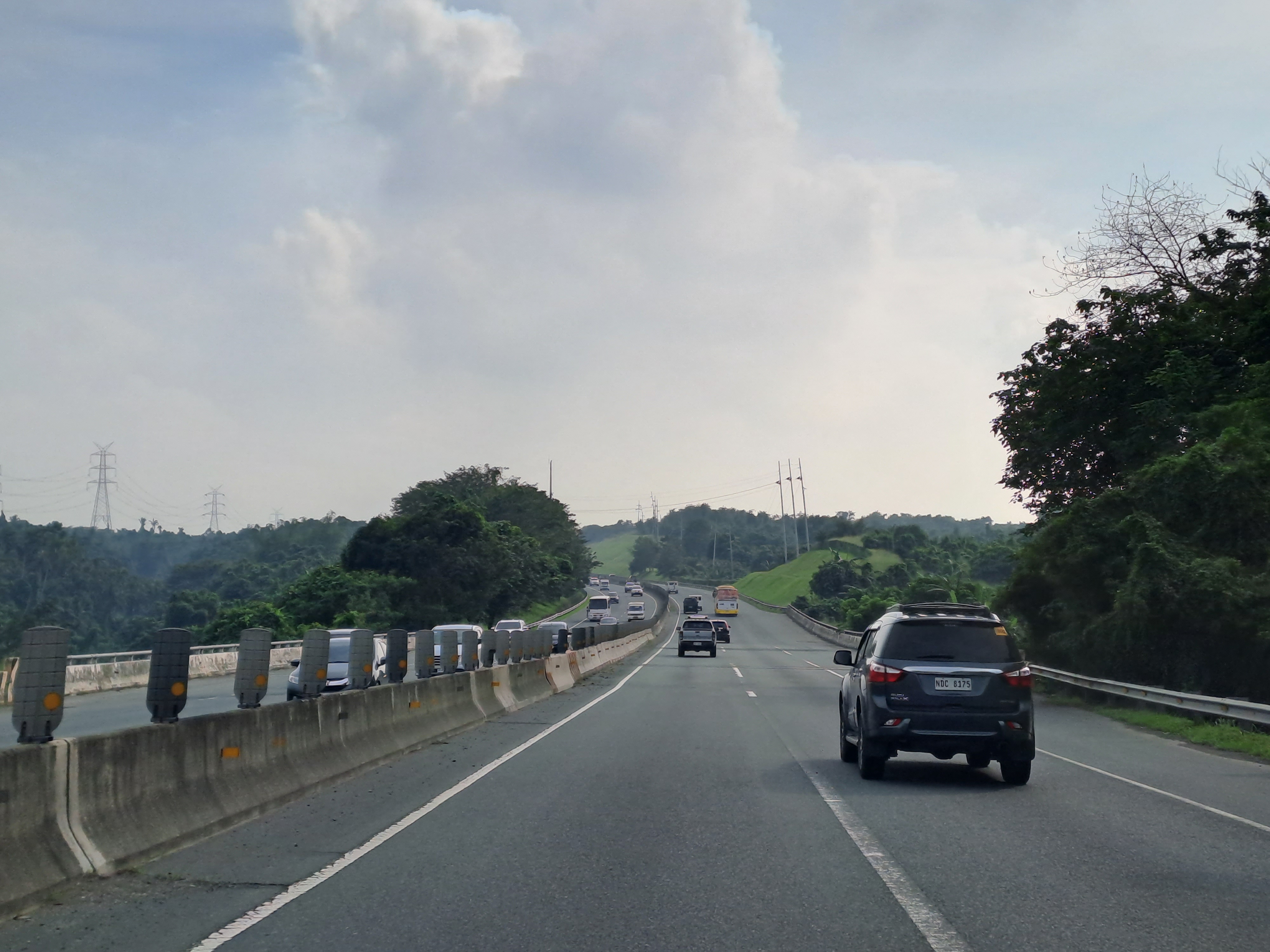
SLEX Toll Road 3 southbound in Calamba

The South Luzon Expressway cuts southwards from Metro Manila up to the provinces in Calabarzon. The expressway consists of two sections: the 13.43-kilometer (8.35 mi) Skyway At-Grade segment, which runs underneath the Skyway from Magallanes Interchange in Makati to Alabang Exit in Muntinlupa, and the 36.13-kilometer (22.45 mi) South Luzon Tollway (SLT) segment, also called the Alabang–Calamba–Santo Tomas Expressway (ACTEX), from Alabang to Santo Tomas, Batangas. Skyway At-Grade operations are held jointly by the Skyway Operations and Maintenance Corporation (SOMCO) and SMC Skyway Corporation (formerly Citra Metro Manila Tollways Corporation), while the South Luzon Tollway segment of SLEX is held by SMC SLEX, Inc. (formerly South Luzon Tollway Corporation), a concessionaire operated by Manila Toll Expressway Systems, Inc. (MATES) and a joint venture of the Philippine National Construction Corporation and the San Miguel Corporation-backed PT Citra Marga Nusaphala Persada Tbk group of Indonesia. SLT/ACTEX is further divided into three phases:

- SLEX Toll Road 1 (TR1): Alabang Viaduct in Muntinlupa
- SLEX Toll Road 2 (TR2): Filinvest Exit to Calamba Exit
- SLEX Toll Road 3 (TR3): Calamba Exit to SLEX-STAR Tollway boundary signages

The South Luzon Expressway starts as the physical extension of Osmeña Highway past the Magallanes Interchange, where it also meets Circumferential Road 4, EDSA. The expressway runs through 49.56 km (30.80 miles), spanning the cities of Makati, Pasay, Taguig, Parañaque, and Muntinlupa in Metro Manila and the provinces of Cavite, Laguna, and Batangas. From its northern terminus at Magallanes Interchange, the expressway follows a straight path southeast in parallel to the PNR South Main Line until the Bicutan Exit, where it slightly bends to the south towards the Alabang Exit. Two service roads run on either side of the expressway from Sales Interchange to Alabang Exit, namely: West Service Road and East Service Road. Bicycle lanes are also present on the outermost lane of the toll-free northern section of the expressway, between the Magallanes and Sales Interchanges.

At the Alabang Exit, SLEX ascends to the Alabang Viaduct, a 1.242-kilometer (0.772 mi), eight-lane viaduct over the Manila South Road through Alabang, Muntinlupa. After its descent at Filinvest Exit, SLEX mostly parallels the Manila South Road in Muntinlupa and northwestern Laguna, passing through the Susana Heights Exit connecting it to the Muntinlupa–Cavite Expressway. It continues as a straight roadway lined with billboards and passing through residential and industrial areas. Past the San Pedro Exit, the expressway then curves and ascends past the Petron and Caltex service areas. Past Santa Rosa Exit, SLEX narrows with guard rails as the median divider. At the Calamba Exit, the Pan-Philippine Highway concurrency ends as it leaves the expressway towards the west as Maharlika Highway. Past such exit, the expressway further narrows without exits and with bridges built with wide shoulders to accommodate future widening. It follows a curved route paralleling the Pan-Philippine Highway (Maharlika Highway) from Calamba to Santo Tomas, Batangas. It then meets its future interchange with SLEX Toll Road 4 (TR4), which will extend it up to Lucena and eventually to Matnog, Sorsogon, via SLEX Toll Road 5 (TR5).

The expressway curves after an interchange leading to SLEX TR4 and TR5 as it enters Santo Tomas before it ends at the SLEX-STAR boundary signages at kilometer 57.4 after LISP Underpass and before Santo Tomas southbound exit and entrance (the interchange's northbound entrance from Pan-Philippine Highway is within the SLEX jurisdiction while the southbound is under STAR Tollway due to it being located after the said signages and part of STAR's construction) where the road continues south towards Batangas City through the latter.

== History ==
=== Planning and construction ===
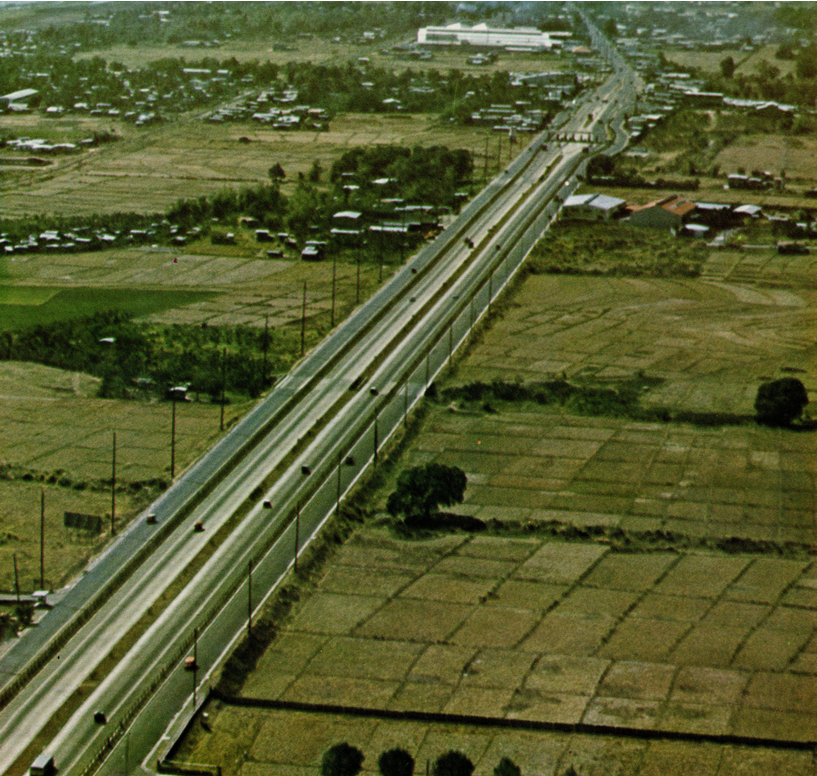
SLEX near the original Alabang Toll Plaza in 1976

The South Luzon Expressway was originally built during the 1960s as the Manila South Diversion Road, South Superhighway, or Manila South Expressway as newer roads used to travel from and to Manila. Located then in the province of Rizal, the original stretch of the expressway, spanning approximately 15 kilometers (9.3 mi) from EDSA (Highway 54) in Magallanes, Makati to Alabang Exit in Muntinlupa, was constructed beginning in 1967 and was completed on December 16, 1969. It is the second roadway project completed by the Philippine National Construction Corporation, after North Luzon Expressway.

Later, the expressway was extended by another 29 kilometers (18 mi) from Alabang up to Calamba, Laguna through the Manila South Expressway Extension project. It included the 1.2-kilometer-long (0.75 mi) Alabang Viaduct in Alabang. Construction on the extension kicked off in 1974. The extension was completed and inaugurated by President Ferdinand Marcos on May 4, 1978, and was opened to public use a few weeks later. The name of this highway, as it is now commonly referred to, significantly reduces travel time from Alabang in Metro Manila to Calamba, Laguna, by over 50 percent, decreasing the journey from one hour to approximately 20 minutes. The construction of this expressway incurred a cost of ₱227.7 million.

This Alabang to Calamba segment originally had four lanes and traverses multiple municipalities in Cavite and Laguna before reaching Calamba. It included four interchanges, two viaducts, eleven twin bridges, nineteen overpasses, and six underpasses, with a total bridge superstructure length of 3,600 meters (11,800 ft). The widths of the bridges ranged from two to six lanes. Notably, the Alabang Viaduct stands out as the most remarkable structure, originally having six traffic lanes along its entire length of 840 meters (2,760 ft), making it the longest six-lane viaduct in the country at that time. Marubeni was the contractor for the extension project.

In 1982, South Superhighway from Magallanes to Calamba was renamed to Dr. Jose P. Rizal Highway, after the Philippine national hero Dr. José Rizal, who hailed from Laguna. This renaming was brought about by Batas Pambansa Blg. 264. In 1989, it was renamed to President Sergio Osmeña Sr. Highway, after the Commonwealth President Sergio Osmeña, by virtue of Republic Act No. 6760. The act was amended through Republic Act No. 7625 in 1992 to rename its portion in Laguna from kilometer 28.387 in San Pedro southwards to Dr. Jose P. Rizal Highway.

In 1995, the rehabilitation of the 13.43-kilometer (8.35 mi) portion of SLEX from Magallanes to Alabang began as part of South Metro Manila Skyway Project Stage 1 that also includes the construction of the elevated Skyway above it up to Bicutan area. Thus, the Alabang Exit, which was also the expressway's former southern terminus, was designated as the concession boundary as PNCC decided to split SLEX into two concessions – the section from Magallanes to Alabang is made part of the Skyway System as the Skyway At-Grade, while the remaining section from Alabang southwards retains the South Luzon Expressway concession branding.

=== Expansion and rehabilitation ===
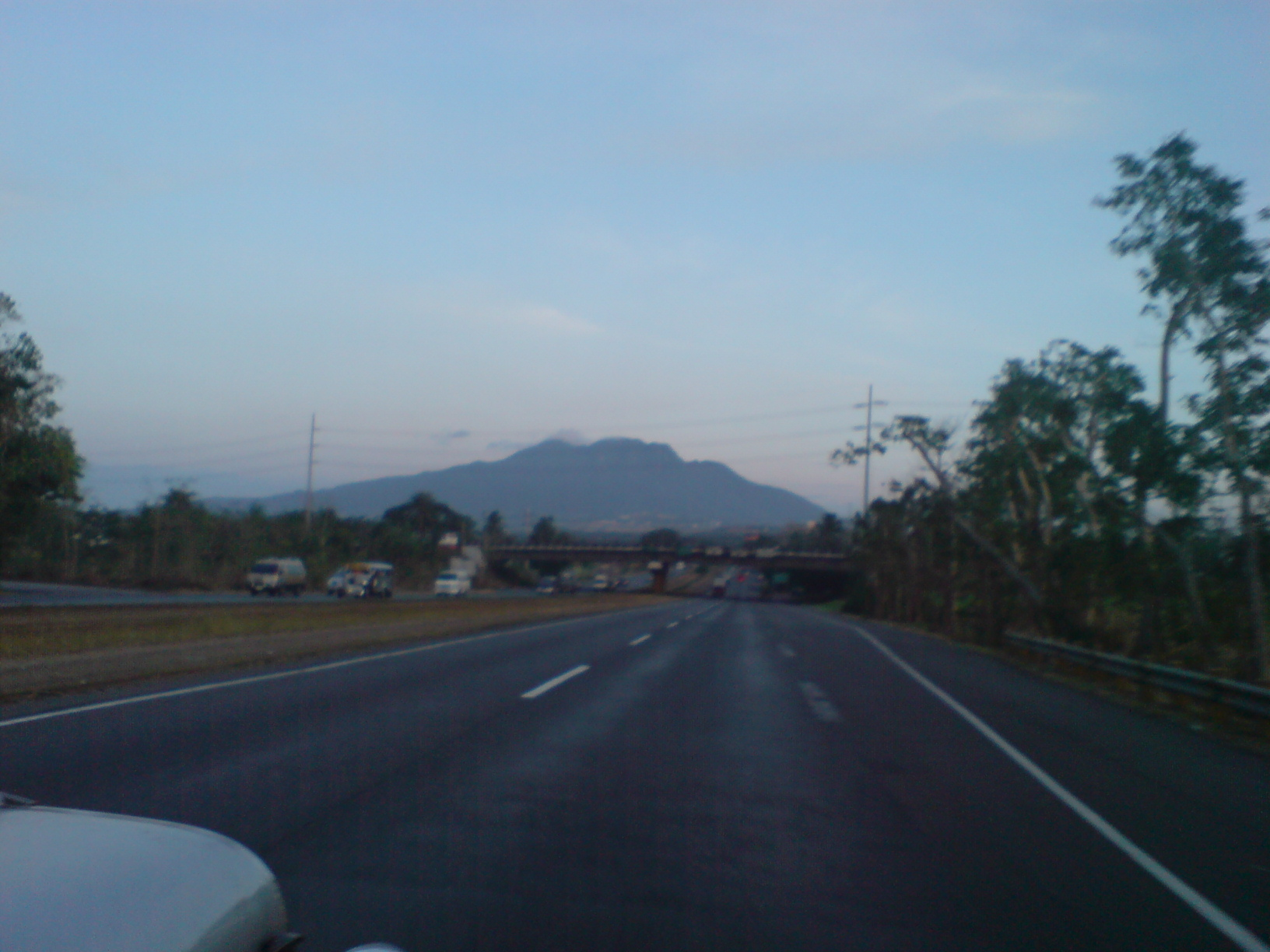
SLEX Calamba segment in 2007, prior to the completion of rehabilitation work

In 1977, President Marcos signed a decree proposing to extend the expressway to Lucena, Quezon. The PNCC proposal involved a three-stage extension for the expressway: beginning with a 6.27-kilometer (3.90 mi) stretch to Santo Tomas, followed by a 29.55-kilometer (18.36 mi) section to Tiaong, and concluding with a 31.05-kilometer (19.29 mi) segment to Lucena. This project would have resulted in a total length of 66.87 kilometers (41.55 mi).

In 1996, PNCC entered into a joint venture with Hong Kong-based Hopewell Holdings to modernize and extend the expressway. Due to financial difficulties, Hopewell partnered with Crown Equities Inc. to form a joint venture, Hopewell Crown Infrastructure Inc. (HCII). HCII suggests extending the expressway through a joint venture from Calamba to Santo Tomas, covering approximately 7.5 kilometers (4.7 mi), and continuing on to Pagbilao for a total distance of 72.1 kilometers (44.8 mi). However, the deal with PNCC was terminated in 2005. The company was negotiating potential ventures with Egis of France, Leighton of Australia, Cise of Spain, MTD Capital of Malaysia, American company Transcore, and SNC Lavalin (now AtkinsRéalis) of Canada prior to Hopewell's departure. MTD and its subsidiary, MTD Equity, agreed to buy out HCII shares and rights from Crown Equities.

On February 1, 2006, a new agreement was signed between MTD and PNCC to rehabilitate, extend, and operate the expressway. Rehabilitation work started in May of that year, with heavy traffic brought by construction work. Prior to its rehabilitation, the South Luzon Expressway section from Alabang to Calamba was mostly an expressway with a grass median and two lanes per direction.

The widening of the Alabang Viaduct from three to four lanes per direction, a phase known as the SLEX Toll Road 1, was completed on December 11, 2008. Rehabilitation work on SLEX Toll Road 2 was finished in June 2009, resulting in the expansion of the Alabang–Santa Rosa section to eight lanes (four lanes per direction), similar to an American Interstate Highway, and the Santa Rosa–Calamba section to six lanes (three lanes per direction). Toll Roads 1 and 2 both involved the rehabilitation and modernization of existing Alabang–Calamba section of the expressway from 2006 to 2009.

Toll Road 3, a connection between the former Calamba terminus of the expressway and SLEX-STAR boundary signages after LISP Underpass and before Santo Tomas southbound exit and entrance, began construction in 2007 and reached the said boundary at the second quarter of 2008 connecting SLEX with STAR which makes the latter now as SLEX's current southern terminus since then. The finished link was inaugurated on June 15, 2010, by President Gloria Macapagal Arroyo and opened to the public six months later on December 15 of that same year, during the administration of her successor Benigno Aquino III, with the name Alabang–Calamba–Santo Tomas Expressway (ACTEX).

During the construction of Skyway Stage 2 from 2009 to 2011, there were traffic disruptions on the Bicutan–Alabang section. The use of the sosrobahu method to build and position the bridge piers helped mitigate these disruptions.

Two years after the expressway was connected to the STAR Tollway, and eleven months after the completion of widening, rehabilitation and modernization of the expressway's Alabang–Calamba section, the operation and maintenance of the expressway was transferred from the government-owned Philippine National Construction Corporation (PNCC) to SLTC, now known as SMC SLEX, Inc. and Manila Toll Expressway Systems (MATES) on May 2, 2010.

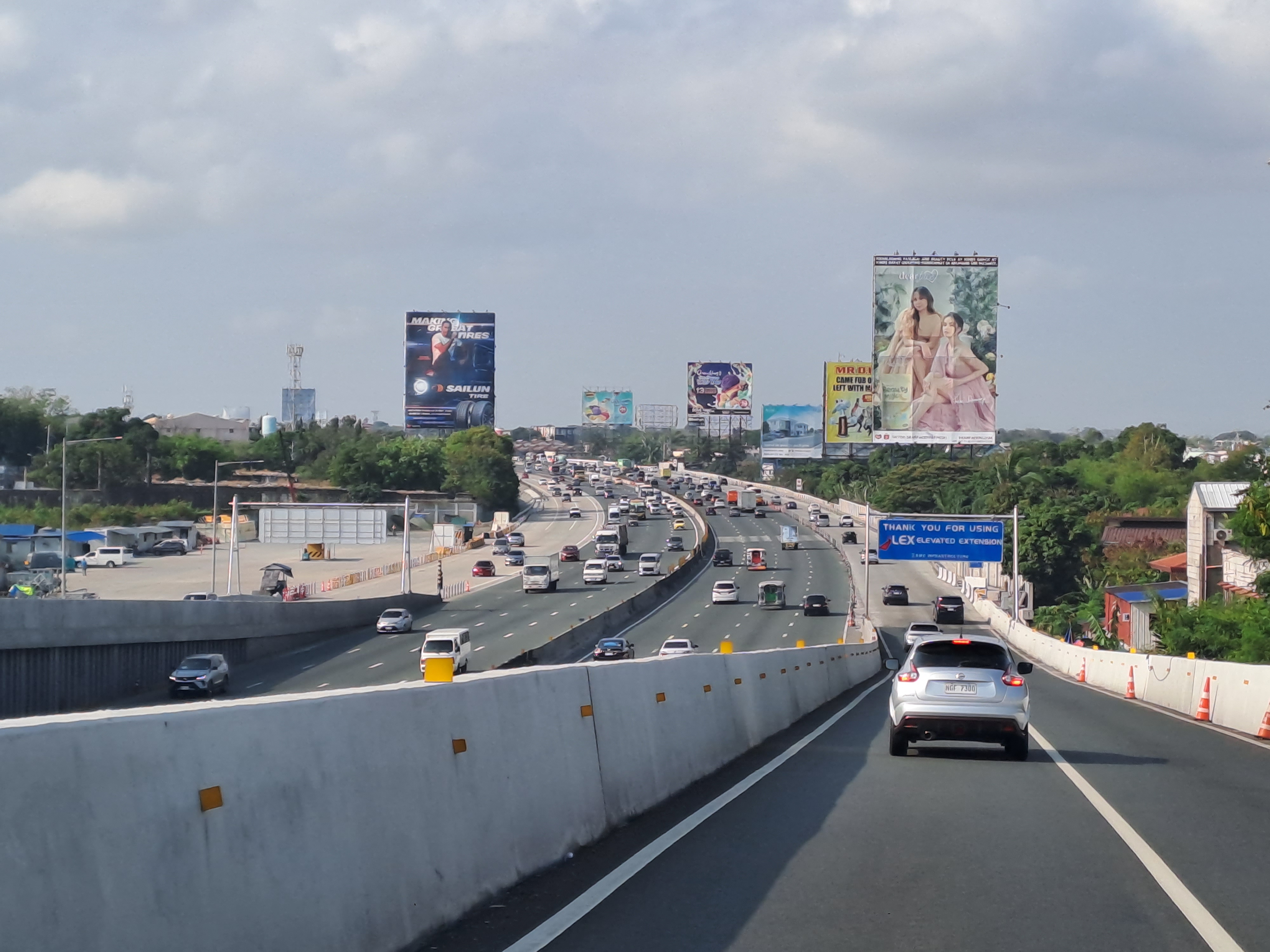
Southbound view of SLEX in Muntinlupa from SLaeX Elevated Extension in 2023, with the additional lanes

MTD relinquished its stake in operating and maintaining SLEX to San Miguel Corporation (SMC) in January 2012. To decongest traffic, the SLEX Elevated Extension, originally known as Skyway Extension project, was constructed along the shoulder of the expressway in Muntinlupa from 2019 to 2021 and has connected the expressway's segment south of the Alabang Viaduct to Skyway Stage 2.

In December 2022, the implementation of the Seamless Southern Tollways project began on SLEX to simplify the toll collection process to a single payment upon exit. Additional toll plazas were built at interchanges from Canlubang to Santo Tomas, while the Calamba and Ayala Greenfield Estates toll plazas were eventually demolished in 2024. In 2023, an expansion project began to widen the expressway's segment south of the SLEX Elevated Extension ramps to six (2x6) lanes per direction, necessitating the felling of 8,766 trees along the route. The project also involves the expansion of 20 bridges along SLEX, with completion targeted for mid-2025. It is expected to be complete by June 2025. In addition, the Ayala Greenfield Interchange in Calamba broke ground on October 14, 2024.

== Future ==
=== Toll Road 4 ===
SLEX Toll Road 4
- Location: Calamba, Laguna – Lucena
- Length: 66.74 km (41.47 mi)

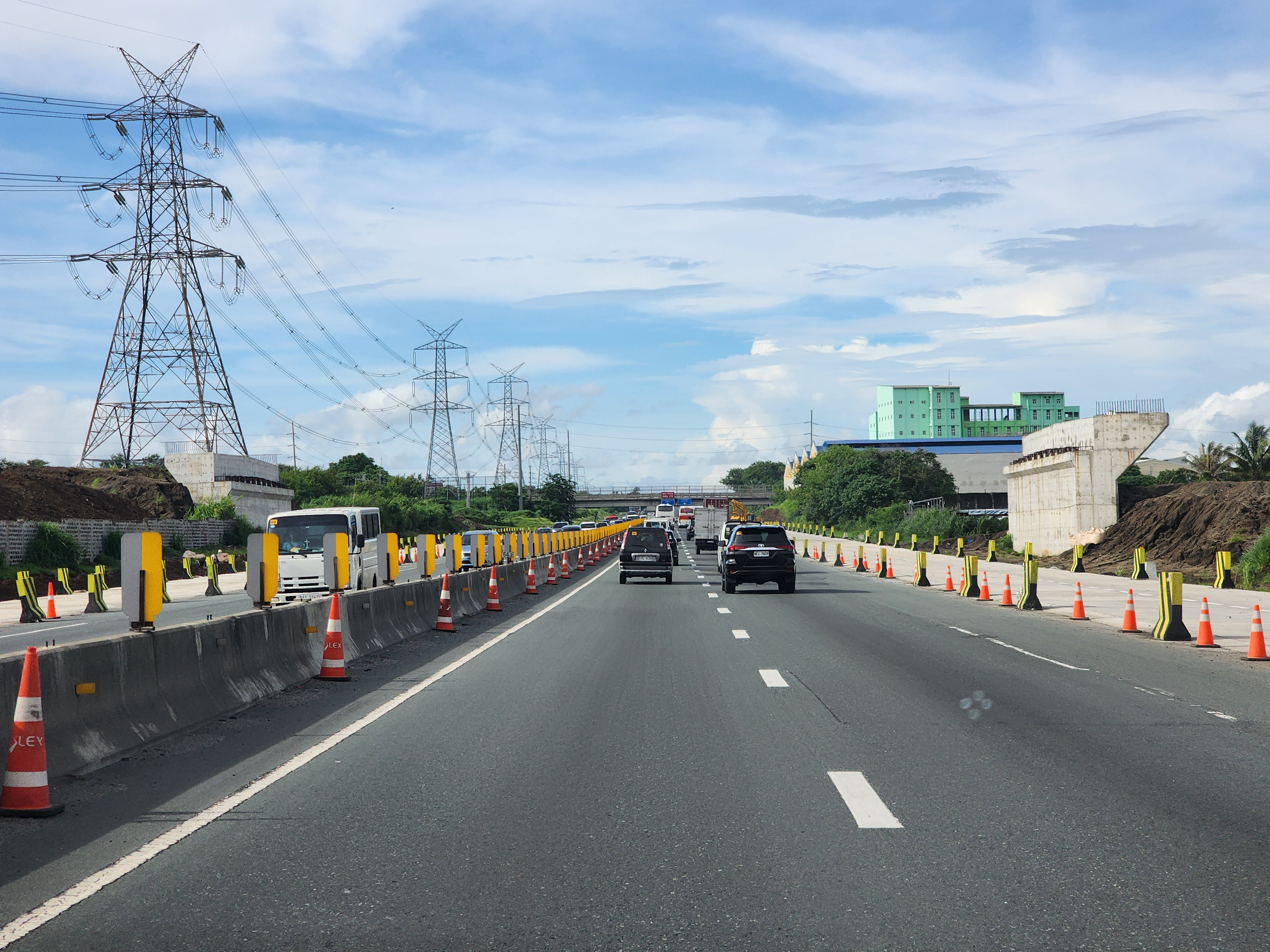
Future interchange of SLEX Toll Roads 3 and 4 (under construction) in Calamba, as of June 2024.

The South Luzon Expressway Toll Road 4, also referred to as Toll Road 4 (TR4), is a 66.74-kilometer (41.47 mi) extension of South Luzon Expressway from Calamba (near its boundary with Santo Tomas, Batangas) to Lucena. Construction is divided into five segments, with one additional extension to Mayao in Lucena on the revised project outline. The extension project is implemented by the Toll Regulatory Board and will be operated by the SMC SLEX, Inc. (formerly South Luzon Tollway Corporation). The extension would decongest the existing national road between Santo Tomas and Lucena, and provide a modern alternate route for travellers from Quezon to the Bicol Region. Right of way acquisition is ongoing as of 2019, and the groundbreaking ceremony was held on March 26, 2019, alongside the beginning of construction. Right of way has been secured for the initial three segments from Calamba to Tiaong, with ongoing efforts to acquire land for the remaining stretch up to Lucena. The expressway's starting point has been relocated near the Ayala Greenfield Golf Course after several alignment adjustments prompted by right-of-way challenges. This section is designed initially with two lanes per direction, with potential for future expansion to 3–4 lanes. The expressway is expected to partially open this December 2026.

=== Toll Road 5 ===
SLEX Toll Road 5
- Location: Lucena – Matnog, Sorsogon
- Length: 416.48 km (Note: Approximate length) (258.79 mi)

The South Luzon Expressway Toll Road 5, also referred to as Toll Road 5 (TR5), will be the extension of South Luzon Expressway from Mayao, Lucena to the vicinity of Port of Matnog in Matnog, Sorsogon. The total length of the extension would be approximately 417 kilometers (259 mi). It will be four-lane divided toll road with 28 interchanges and eight segments. It aims to decongest Andaya Highway and Pan-Philippine Highway, cut travel time from Manila to Naga by two to three hours, and to Matnog by six hours. When completed, it will become the longest expressway in the Philippines.

On June 29, 2020, the Toll Regulatory Board issued a resolution to declare this project a Toll Road upon the request of, and based on the proposal submitted by the joint venture (JV) of the Philippine National Construction Corporation (PNCC) and San Miguel Holdings Corporation (SMHC). On August 25, 2020, San Miguel Corporation thru South Luzon Toll Road 5 Expressway Inc. announced they will invest this project alongside the Pasig River Expressway with a cost of ₱122 billion in order to boost the economy in Luzon.

The original plans for the expressway's extension was the Quezon–Bicol Expressway (QBEX or QUBEX), which was supposed to be an extension of the SLEX from Pagbilao to San Fernando, Camarines Sur. The 2017 proposal would have been a public-private partnership (PPP), with a total length of 180 kilometers (110 mi), and the 2019 proposal, which would have been 220 kilometers (140 mi), was supposed to be funded through the General Appropriations Act (GAA), but the proposal was later removed from the priority projects list.

On June 3, 2022, the Department of Transportation and San Miguel Corporation signed a Supplemental Toll Operations Agreement (STOA) for SLEX Toll Road 5, which was approved by President Rodrigo Duterte 24 days later. The construction would begin in 2025. As of 2026, pre-construction and right of way activities are ongoing.

=== Other future plans ===
Other planned expansion projects in the SMC–PNCC joint venture pipeline with connections to either SLEX and the Skyway system include:

1. the San Pedro–C6 Laguna Lake Road that will link SLEX from San Pedro, Laguna to C-6 in Taguig;
2. Skyway Stage 8 or Tanauan–Tagaytay Expressway, a 29-kilometer (18 mi) toll road;
3. Skyway Stage 7 that will connect Taguig to Commonwealth Avenue in Quezon City;
4. Buendia Interchange and Ramp Extension to Macapagal Boulevard.

== Toll ==
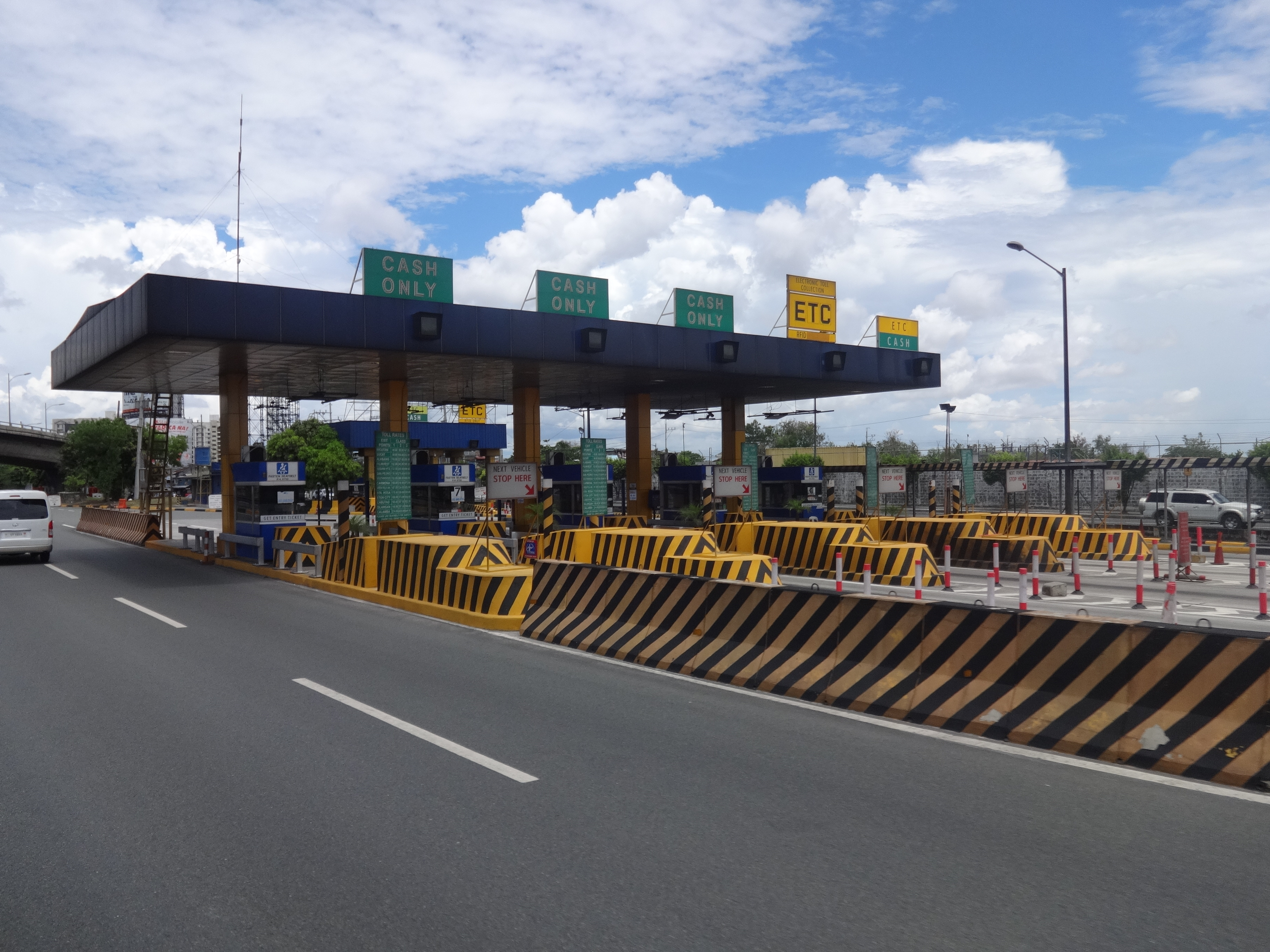
Nichols Toll Plaza (southbound)

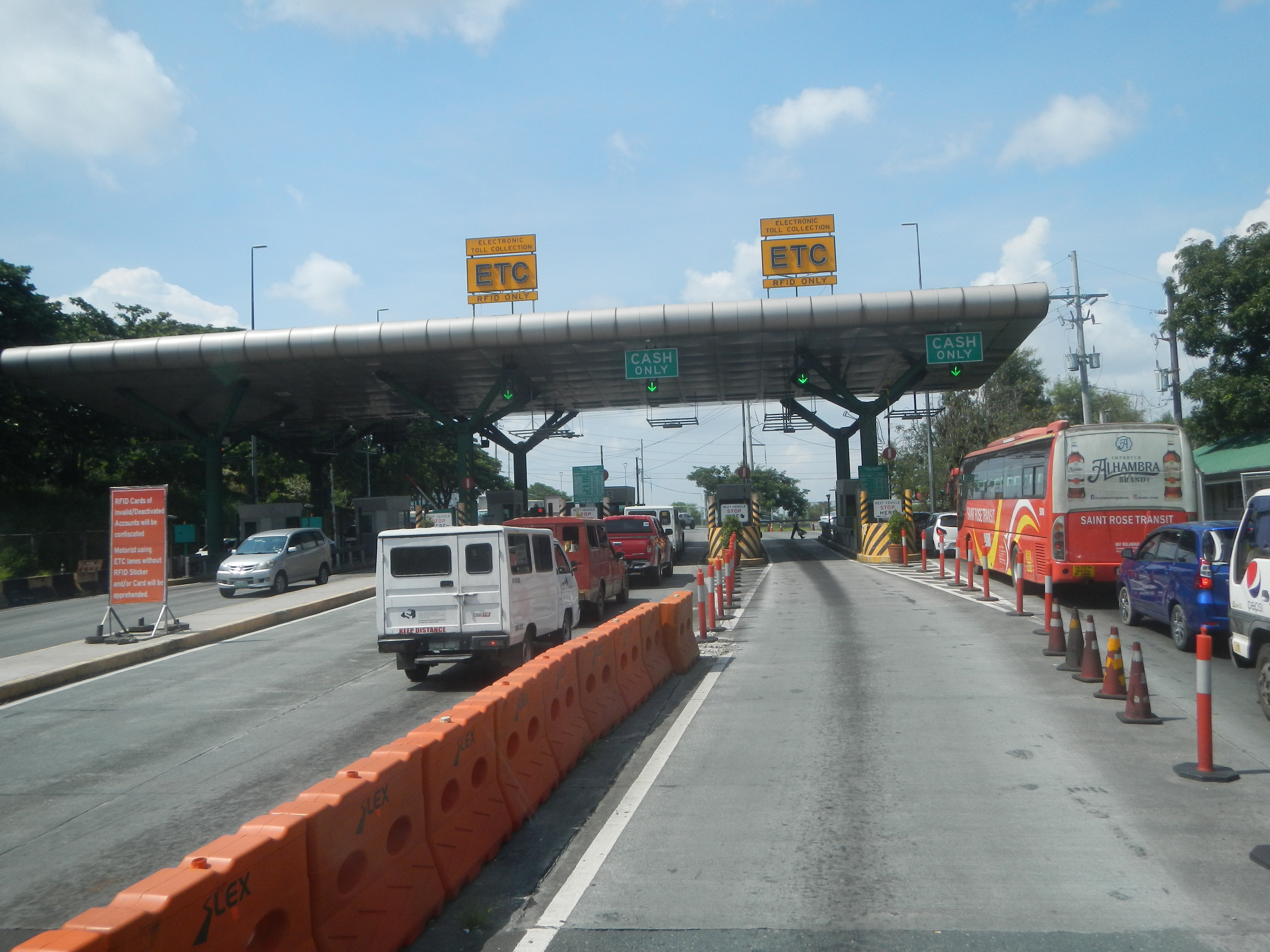
Susana Heights Toll Plaza

Previously employing closed and barrier toll systems, the South Luzon Expressway fully employs a closed road system, wherein the toll fee is charged based on vehicle class and the distance travelled from the entry to exit point. The expressway's toll system is integrated with the South Metro Manila Skyway Project and Muntinlupa–Cavite Expressway (MCX).

Toll collection is done upon exit at either SLEX, STAR Tollway, or MCX, or at Skyway Main toll plaza in Muntinlupa, as part of San Miguel Corporation's Seamless Southern Tollways program. Access on the northernmost segment between Magallanes and Sales interchanges remain toll-free.

The expressway fully implements an electronic toll collection (ETC) system, the Autosweep RFID, using RFID technology, and the system formerly used "E-Pass", which uses transponder technology. The ETC system is shared by the Skyway, STAR Tollway, NAIAX, MCX and TPLEX. Cash payments are still accepted although ETC is currently being maximized.

The toll rates by vehicle class are as follows:

Class	Amount (Magallanes–Alabang)	Amount (Alabang–Santo Tomas)
Class 1 (Cars, Motorcycles, SUVs, Jeepneys)	₱8.84/km	₱4.80/km
Class 2 (Buses, Light Trucks)	₱17.67/km	₱9.60/km
Class 3 (Heavy Trucks)	₱26.51/km	₱14.40/km

== Services ==
=== Service areas ===
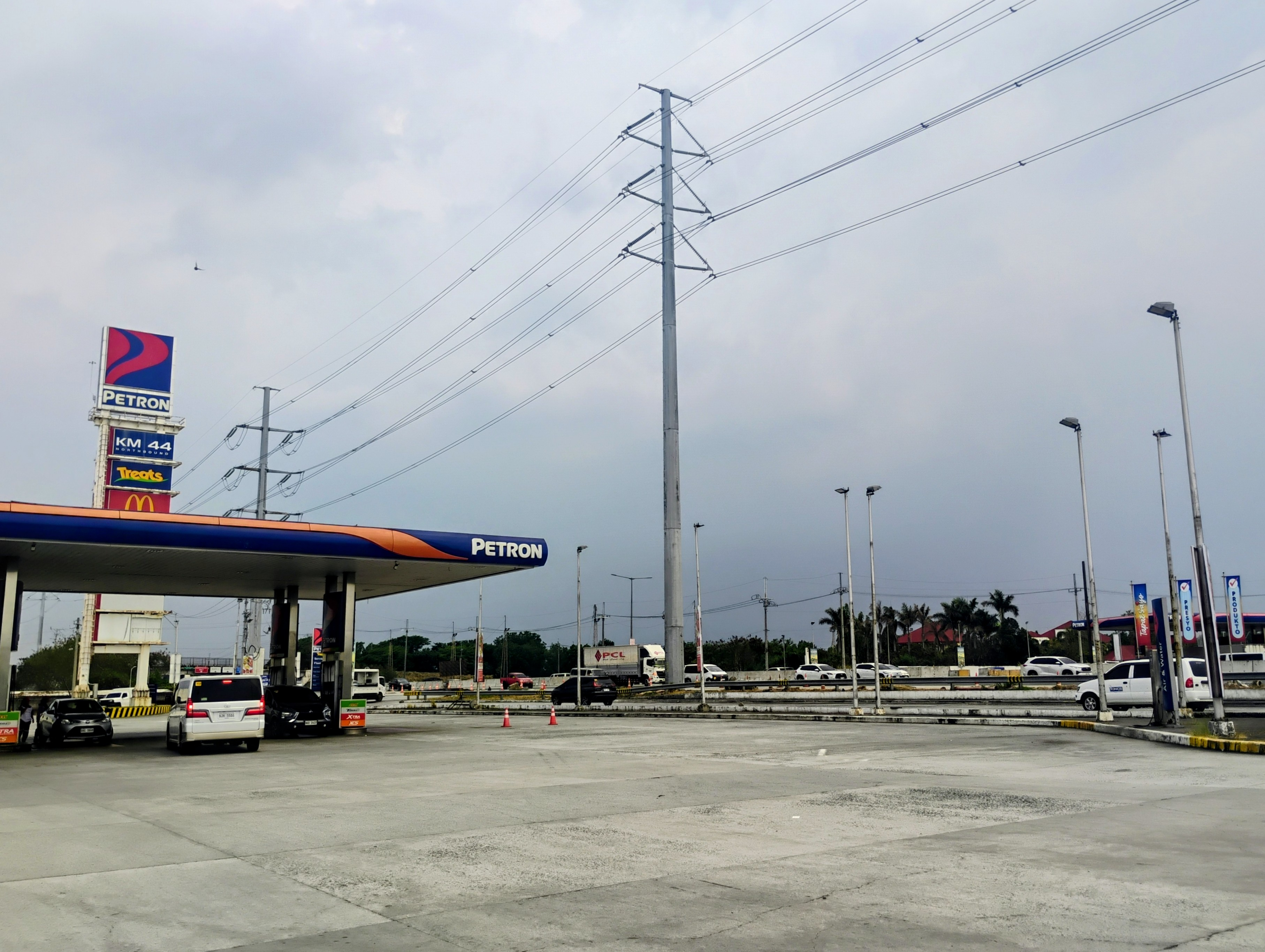
Petron Km. 44 Northbound in Calamba

The South Luzon Expressway currently has nine service areas, with four on the northbound and five on the southbound. All existing service areas occupy large land areas and have restaurants and retail space. The service areas also provide ETC reloading for Autosweep RFID users.

Location	Kilometer	Name	Services	Notes
Makati	8.7	Caltex Magallanes	BadHabit, Caltex	Southbound only. Formerly Shell Magallanes until 2024.
Muntinlupa	24	Caltex SLEX Northbound	Caltex, a shop	Demolished in 2006 after a larger service area in San Pedro opened
Muntinlupa	25	Shell SLEX Southbound	BDO ATM, BPI ATM, Burger King, Cinnabon, Hen Lin, Jollibee, KFC, Panda Express, Select, Shell, Starbucks, Army Navy, Max's (formerly Sumoutori), UCPB ATM, Pancake House, Red Ribbon, Starbucks Coffee	Southbound only. Originally called Tollway Plaza.
San Pedro	28	Petron SLEX Southbound	BDO ATM, Burger King, Chatime, Chowking, Jollibee, McDonald's, Petron, San Mig Food Ave, Starbucks Coffee, The Coffee Bean & Tea Leaf, Potato Giant	Southbound only
San Pedro	28	Caltex SLEX Northbound	BPI ATM, Brothers Burger, Burger King, Caltex, Chowking, Cinnabon, Hen Lin, Jollibee, KFC, Kuya J, Macao Imperial Tea, McDonald's, Pancake House, Panda Express, 7-Eleven (formerly Star Mart), Starbucks Coffee	Replaced the Caltex service area in Muntinlupa in 2006
Biñan	35	Shell SLEX Northbound	Army Navy, BDO ATM, BPI ATM, Café France, Casio Watch Outlet Store, Cecilia's Buko Pie, Chowking, Cinnabon, Fashion Rack Designer Outlet, J.CO, Jollibee, Kenny Rogers Roasters, KFC, Krispy Kreme, Levi's, Macao Imperial Tea, Max's, McDonald's, Metrobank ATM, Nike Factory Outlet, North Park, Pancake House, Potato Corner, Puma Outlet Store, Rai Rai Ken, RCBC ATM, Select, Shakey's, Shell, Sizzlin' Steak, Starbucks, The Coffee Bean & Tea Leaf, Uncle John's	Northbound only. Outlet stores added in 2016.
Biñan	37	Caltex SLEX Southbound	Addy's Market, Auntie Anne's, Army Navy, BDO ATM, BPI ATM, Brick Barn, EggStop, Kenny Rogers Roasters, Km. 36 South Market, Koomi, Love-a-Bowl, Macao Imperial Tea, McDonald's, North Park, Pepper Lunch, Potato Corner, Seattle's Best Coffee, Shakey's, Sisa's Secret, Starbucks Coffee, Tokyo Tokyo, Yellow Cab Pizza	Southbound only
Santa Rosa	40	Total (SLEX)	BPI ATM, Brothers Burger, Café Bonjour, Jollibee, Krispy Kreme, Mang Inasal, Max's, Miniso, PSBank ATM, RCBC ATM, Tapa King, Total	Northbound only
Calamba	44	Petron KM 44 Southbound	Jollibee (under construction), Mang Inasal, McDonald's, Petron, Potato Giant, Razon's Halo Halo & Palabok, San Mig Food Ave	Southbound only. Former Philippine National Construction Corporation field office.
Calamba	44	Petron KM 44 Northbound	McDonald's, Petron, Potato Giant, Rowena's, San Mig Food Ave, Chick 'n Juicy	Northbound only. Former Philippine National Construction Corporation equipment storage.

=== Lay-bys ===
The South Luzon Expressway also has lay-bys, or emergency parking areas where motorists can stop for safety checks on their vehicles and other emergencies.

== Exits ==
Exits are numbered by kilometer posts, with Rizal Park in Manila designated as kilometer zero. Exits are mostly named and numbered, but exit numbers appear only after the Alabang Exit. There is a discrepancy in mileage, with kilometer 24 being kilometer 23 on the Manila Toll Expressway Systems (MATES)–maintained segments of the expressway. No tolls are paid on the section north of the Nichols Toll Plaza.

Region	Province	City/Municipality	km	mi	Exit	Name	Destinations	Notes
Metro Manila	Makati		8	5.0			AH26 (EDSA) – Cubao, Pasay	Magallanes Interchange; north end of AH26 concurrency; northern terminus; continues north to Manila as N145 (Osmeña Highway)
Metro Manila	Makati		8.2	5.1			San Gregorio Street	Southbound access only
Metro Manila	Makati		8.33	5.18				Southbound entry only, from Paseo de Magallanes
Metro Manila	Makati		8.43	5.24				Southbound access only; near Honda Cars Makati
Metro Manila	Makati		8.67	5.39			Magallanes Avenue	Southbound access only
Metro Manila	Makati		8.7	5.4	Caltex service station (southbound)			
Metro Manila	Pasay – Taguig boundary		8.9– 9.0	5.5– 5.6			AH26 (Skyway)	Magallanes Exit of Skyway; southbound exit and northbound entrance
Metro Manila	Pasay		9.6– 9.8	6.0– 6.1		Nichols	N192 (Sales Road) / Lawton Avenue – Airport, Villamor Airbase, BGC	Partial cloverleaf interchange, part of Sales Interchange
Metro Manila	Pasay				North end of expressway restrictions			
Metro Manila	Pasay				Manila South Expressway: Nichols Toll Plaza (1969–1998; demolished)			
Metro Manila	Pasay		10.15	6.31	Nichols Toll Plaza B (northbound only)			
Metro Manila	Pasay		10.3	6.4	Nichols Toll Plaza A (northbound only)			
Metro Manila	Pasay		10.9	6.8		Merville	C-5 Road Extension / West Service Road – Merville	Southbound exit only
Metro Manila	Pasay		11	6.8	Nichols Toll Plaza A (southbound only)			
Metro Manila	Pasay		11.1	6.9	Nichols Toll Plaza B (southbound only)			
Metro Manila	Pasay – Taguig boundary		11.5– 11.7	7.1– 7.3		C-5 (C-5 - Taguig)	N11 (Carlos P. Garcia Avenue) – Pasig, Taguig	Northbound exit and southbound entrance
Metro Manila	Parañaque		14– 14.4	8.7– 8.9		Bicutan	Doña Soledad Avenue – Bicutan	Diamond interchange
Metro Manila	Parañaque		15	9.3			Skyway	Former northbound exit and southbound entrance (1998–2011)
Metro Manila	Parañaque – Muntinlupa boundary		17.7– 18.0	11.0– 11.2		Sucat	N63 (Dr. A. Santos Avenue) – Sucat, BF Homes	Diamond interchange
Metro Manila	Muntinlupa		19.4	12.1		Alabang	East Service Road	Temporary northbound entrance during the construction of Skyway/SLEX Elevated Extension Project
Metro Manila	Muntinlupa		19.7	12.2			AH26 (Skyway)	Hillsborough on- and off-ramp of Skyway; former northbound exit (2011–2020) and southbound entrance (2011–2021)
Metro Manila	Muntinlupa		19.6	12.2		Alabang	East Service Road	Temporary northbound entrance to SLEX and on to Skyway during the construction of Skyway/SLEX Elevated Extension Project (2019–2020)
Metro Manila	Muntinlupa		21.3	13.2		South Station	South Station, Filinvest City	Southbound exit only; considered as part of Alabang Exit on the toll matrix
Metro Manila	Muntinlupa		21.3	13.2		Alabang	N1 (Manila South Road) / N411 (Alabang–Zapote Road) / N142 (Montillano Street) – Alabang	Southbound exit and northbound entrance. Former southern terminus (1969–1978)
Metro Manila	Muntinlupa		21.3	13.2	North end of Alabang Viaduct; Maintenance transition from Skyway Operations and Maintenance Corporation (SOMCO) to Manila Toll Expressway Systems, Inc. (MATES)			
Metro Manila	Muntinlupa				Manila South Expressway: Alabang Toll Plaza (1969–1978; demolished)			
Metro Manila	Muntinlupa		21.4	13.3			Skyway	Temporary southbound entrance and northbound exit during the construction of Skyway/SLEX Elevated Extension (2019–2021)
Metro Manila	Muntinlupa		21.5	13.4			Skyway	Future permanent northbound exit to be built on the shoulder of Alabang Viaduct
Metro Manila	Muntinlupa		22.4	13.9	South end of Alabang Viaduct			
Metro Manila	Muntinlupa		22.4– 23	13.9– 14	23	Filinvest (Alabang)	Corporate Avenue / Filinvest Avenue – Filinvest City, Las Piñas	Trumpet interchange
Metro Manila	Muntinlupa		23	14		Alabang	N1 (Manila South Road) – Alabang, Bayanan.	Northbound exit and southbound entrance; toll booths for southbound entry moved to dedicated booths shared with Alabang Exit.
Metro Manila	Muntinlupa		23.5– 23.6	14.6– 14.7			SLEX Elevated Extension (Skyway Extension)	Northbound exit and southbound entrance
Metro Manila	Muntinlupa		23.7	14.7	Caltex service area (northbound only, demolished)			
Metro Manila	Muntinlupa		24.7	15.3	Shell service area (southbound)			
Metro Manila	Muntinlupa		25.5– 26.45	15.8– 16.44	26	MCX / Villar City (Susana Heights)	E2 (MCX) / Susana Heights Access Road – Daang Hari, Villar City, Susana Heights, Muntinlupa	Hybrid trumpet and directional T interchange
Calabarzon	Laguna	San Pedro	27.5	17.1	27	San Pedro	San Antonio Drive / Ynion Drive / Magsaysay Road – San Pedro, La Marea	Folded diamond interchange
Calabarzon	Laguna	San Pedro	29	18	Petron service area (southbound)			
Calabarzon	Laguna	San Pedro	29	18	Caltex service area (northbound)			
Calabarzon	Laguna	Biñan	31.2– 31.9	19.4– 19.8	31	Southwoods	Southwoods Avenue / Enterprise Avenue – Southwoods City, Biñan	Folded diamond interchange
Calabarzon	Cavite	Carmona	33.3– 33.47	20.7– 20.80	33	Carmona	N65 (Governor's Drive) – Carmona, Biñan, Dasmariñas	Trumpet interchange
Calabarzon	Laguna	Biñan	35	22	Shell service area (northbound)			
Calabarzon	Laguna	Biñan	35.6– 35.7	22.1– 22.2	36	Mamplasan	E3 (CALAX) / Greenfield Parkway / LIIP Avenue – Greenfield City, LIIP, SRIT	Folded diamond interchange
Calabarzon	Laguna	Biñan	37	23	Caltex service area (southbound)			
Calabarzon	Laguna	Santa Rosa	37.8– 38.5	23.5– 23.9	38	Santa Rosa	N420 (Santa Rosa–Tagaytay Road) – Santa Rosa, Tagaytay	Folded diamond interchange
Calabarzon	Laguna	Santa Rosa	40.5	25.2	Total (SLEX) service area (northbound)			
Calabarzon	Laguna	Santa Rosa	42.2	26.2	41	Asia Brewery International / Eton City (Malitlit)	Eton City, Malitlit, Greenfield City, Tagaytay	Double right-in/right-out interchange (Note: The location of Eton City Exit varies according to different sources. It is considered as part of Cabuyao as suggested by the location of the abandoned railroad overpass north of the exit, while various maps show that it is part of Santa Rosa. This is since it is located near the boundary of the aforementioned cities.)
Calabarzon	Laguna	Cabuyao	43.4– 44.0	27.0– 27.3	43	Cabuyao	Pulo–Diezmo Road – Cabuyao, Sta. Elena City	Folded diamond interchange
Calabarzon	Laguna	Calamba	44.5	27.7	Petron KM 44 Southbound			
Calabarzon	Laguna	Calamba	44.5	27.7	Petron KM 44 Northbound			
Calabarzon	Laguna	Calamba	45.0– 45.35	28.0– 28.18	45	Silangan	Silangan Access Road – Silangan, Carmeltown	Folded diamond interchange
Calabarzon	Laguna	Calamba	46.6	29.0		Equus City		Right-in/right-out exit at northbound still fenced
Calabarzon	Laguna	Calamba	47.5	29.5	Calamba Toll Plaza A (2009–2024; demolished)			
Calabarzon	Laguna	Calamba	47.7	29.6	Calamba Toll Plaza (1978–2009; demolished)			
Calabarzon	Laguna	Calamba	47.75	29.67	Calamba Toll Plaza B (2009–2024; demolished, southbound only)			
Calabarzon	Laguna	Calamba	47.3– 47.65	29.4– 29.61	47	Canlubang (Mayapa)	N420-1 (Mayapa–Canlubang Cadre Road) – Canlubang, Mayapa	Folded diamond interchange
Calabarzon	Laguna	Calamba	48.85	30.35	49	Batino	Batino, CPIP, Tagaytay Highlands, Ciudad de Calamba	Right-in/right-out exit and entrance at southbound.
Calabarzon	Laguna	Calamba	49.6	30.8	San Juan Bridge over San Juan River			
Calabarzon	Laguna	Calamba	49.8– 50.1	30.9– 31.1	50	Calamba (Turbina-Real)	AH26 (Maharlika Highway) / N1 (Manila South Road) – Turbina, Real, Makiling, Los Baños, Calauan	Half diamond interchange (north half), and partial cloverleaf interchange (south half); south end of AH26 concurrency. Former southern terminus (1978–2010).
Calabarzon	Laguna	Calamba				Ayala Greenfield	Ayala Greenfield Estates	Construction to begin November 2024.
Calabarzon	Laguna	Calamba	52.64	32.71	Ayala Greenfield Estate (Saimsim) Toll Plaza A (2010–2024; demolished, southbound only)			
Calabarzon	Laguna	Calamba	52.8	32.8	Ayala Greenfield Estate (Saimsim) Toll Plaza B (2010–2024; demolished, northbound only)			
Calabarzon	Laguna	Calamba	55	34		Santo Tomas Interchange	SLEX Toll Road 4	Connection with the future SLEX Toll Roads 4 and 5; trumpet interchange
Calabarzon	Batangas	Santo Tomas	57.4	35.7		Santo Tomas		Folded diamond interchange; northbound entrance and southbound exit
Calabarzon	Batangas	Santo Tomas			Current southern terminus (SLEX-STAR Tollway boundary signages) after LISP Underpass and before Santo Tomas southbound exit and entrance (2008–present); continues south to Batangas City as E2 (STAR Tollway)			
1.000 mi = 1.609 km; 1.000 km = 0.621 mi: Closed/former; Incomplete access; Tolled; Unopened

=== Toll Road 4 ===
Province	City/Municipality	km	mi	Exit	Name	Destinations	Notes
Laguna	Calamba	54	34		Santo Tomas	E2 (SLEX) – Manila, Batangas City	Trumpet interchange; connection with the existing route of SLEX (Note: San Miguel Corporation, South Luzon Tollway Corporation, the Department of Public Works and Highways, and news outlets consider the northern/western terminus of SLEX Toll Road 4 to be located in Santo Tomas, Batangas. However, it would actually be located in Calamba, Laguna, just near its boundary with Santo Tomas, according to various maps.)
Batangas	Santo Tomas	65	40		Makban	Alaminos, Bay, Calauan	Trumpet interchange; This will also provide access to the MakBan Geothermal Plant
Laguna	Alaminos			No major junctions			
Laguna	San Pablo	77	48		San Pablo	San Pablo	Trumpet interchange; connection to AH26 (Maharlika Highway) via 3-kilometer (1.9 mi) access road
Quezon	Tiaong	84	52		Tiaong	AH26 (Maharlika Highway) – Tiaong, Dolores	
Quezon	Candelaria			No major junctions			
Quezon	Sariaya			No major junctions			
Quezon	Tayabas	111	69		Tayabas	Calumpang, Tayabas	Trumpet interchange
Quezon	Lucena				Lucena	AH26 (Lucena Diversion Road) – Lucena	Trumpet interchange
Quezon	Lucena				Mayao	AH26 (Lucena Diversion Road) – Lucena, Pagbilao	Future eastern terminus.
1.000 mi = 1.609 km; 1.000 km = 0.621 mi: Unopened

== In popular culture ==
- SLEX was featured in the independent film Closer to Home
- The expressway was featured in the 1996 film Istokwa (starring Mark Anthony Fernandez and Spencer Reyes).
- In the television drama Maalaala Mo Kaya, the 2011 episode titled "Tsinelas" (starring AJ Perez) featured extensive filming along the SLEX. The scenes were shot on the then-six-lane segment in Laguna leading toward Calamba. This episode was the final project of Perez, who died in a vehicular accident shortly after filming concluded.
