= Mayapa–Canlubang Cadre Road =

Road in Calamba, Laguna, Philippines

- Mayapa Road
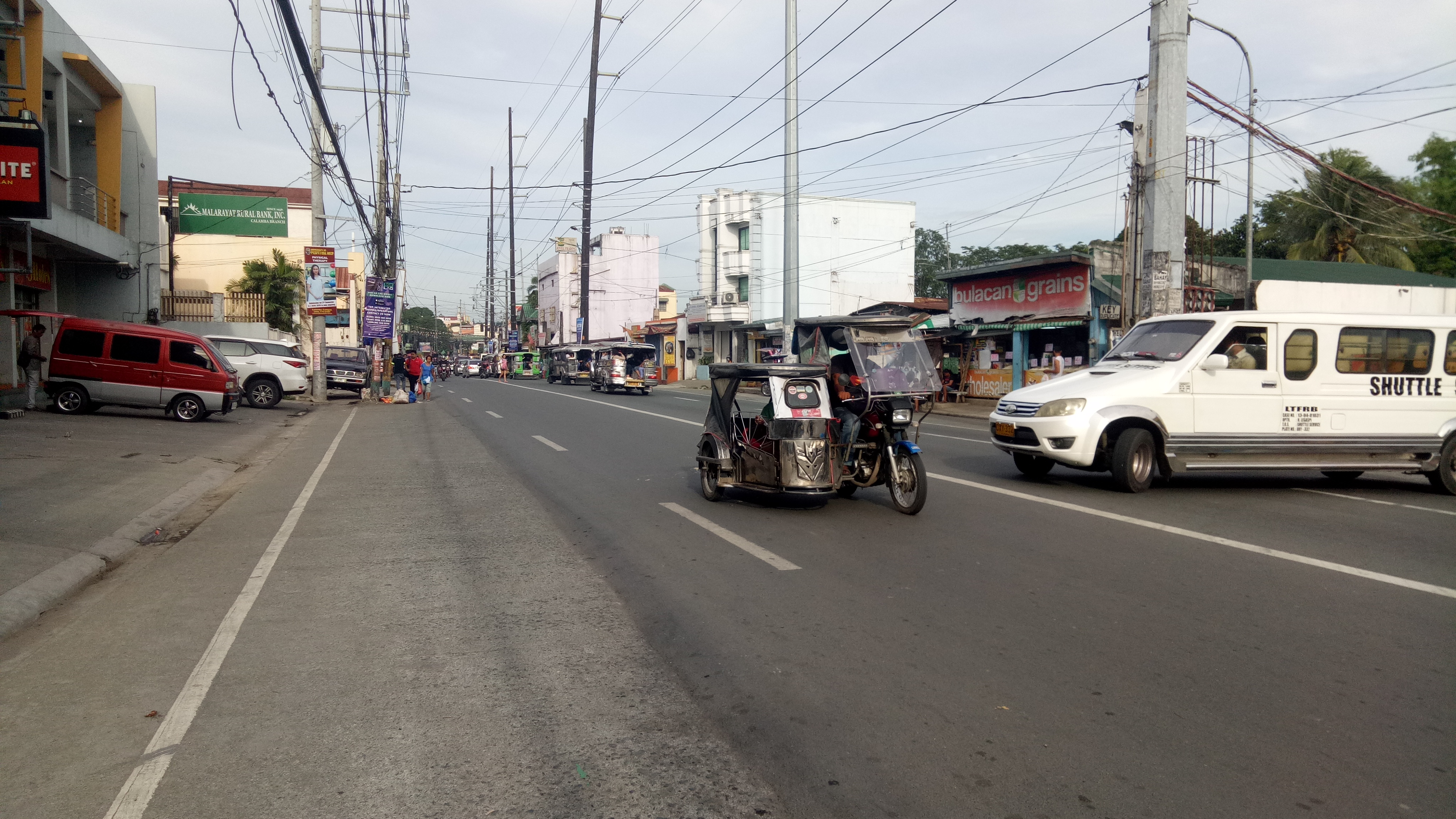
- Mayapa–Canlubang Cadre Road in Canlubang

Route information
- Auxiliary route of N420
- Maintained by Department of Public Works and Highways - Laguna 2nd District Engineering Office
- Length: 2.768 km (1.720 mi)
- Component highways: N420-1

Major junctions
- West end: Jose Yulo, Sr. Avenue and Silangan Industrial Park Road in Canlubang
- AH26 (South Luzon Expressway)
- East end: N1 (Manila South Road) in Paciano Rizal

Location
- Country: Philippines
- Major cities: Calamba

Highway system
- Roads in the Philippines; Highways; Expressways; List

Mayapa–Canlubang Cadre Road, also known as Mayapa Road, is a two- to four-lane, secondary national road, located in Calamba, Laguna in the Philippines. It spans 2.768 kilometers (1.720 mi) stretching from the "Checkpoint" area at the intersection with Manila South Road in barangay Paciano Rizal to Jose Yulo Sr. Avenue and Silangan Industrial Park Road (Doña Cecila Yulo Avenue) in barangay Canlubang. This road adjoins the Canlubang Exit of South Luzon Expressway.

In 2015, the road was reclassified from barangay road to tertiary national road. In 2025, it was reclassified as a secondary national road, thus becoming National Route 420-1 (N420-1) of the Philippine highway network.

== Landmarks ==
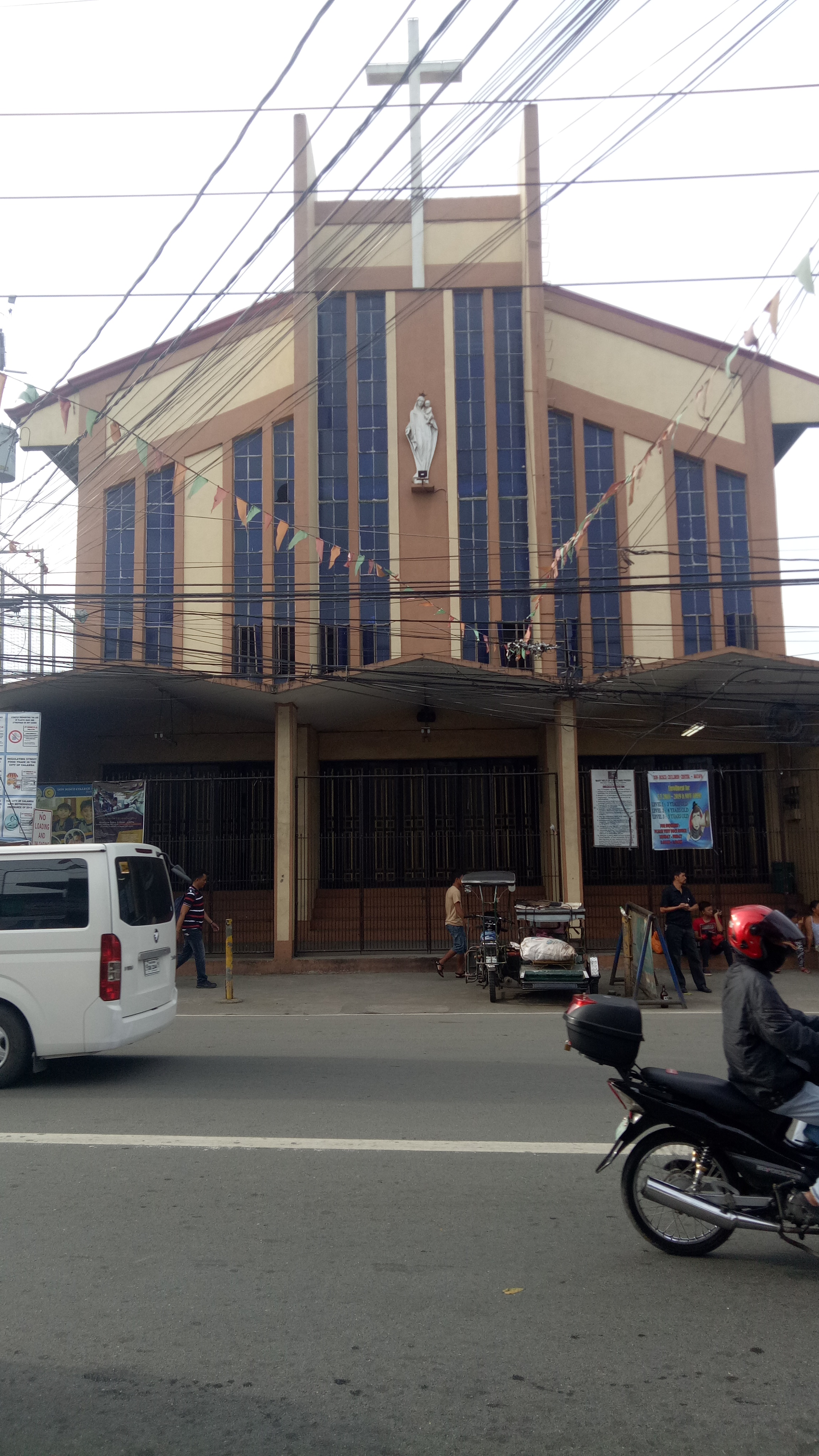
Mary Help of Christians Parish in Mayapa

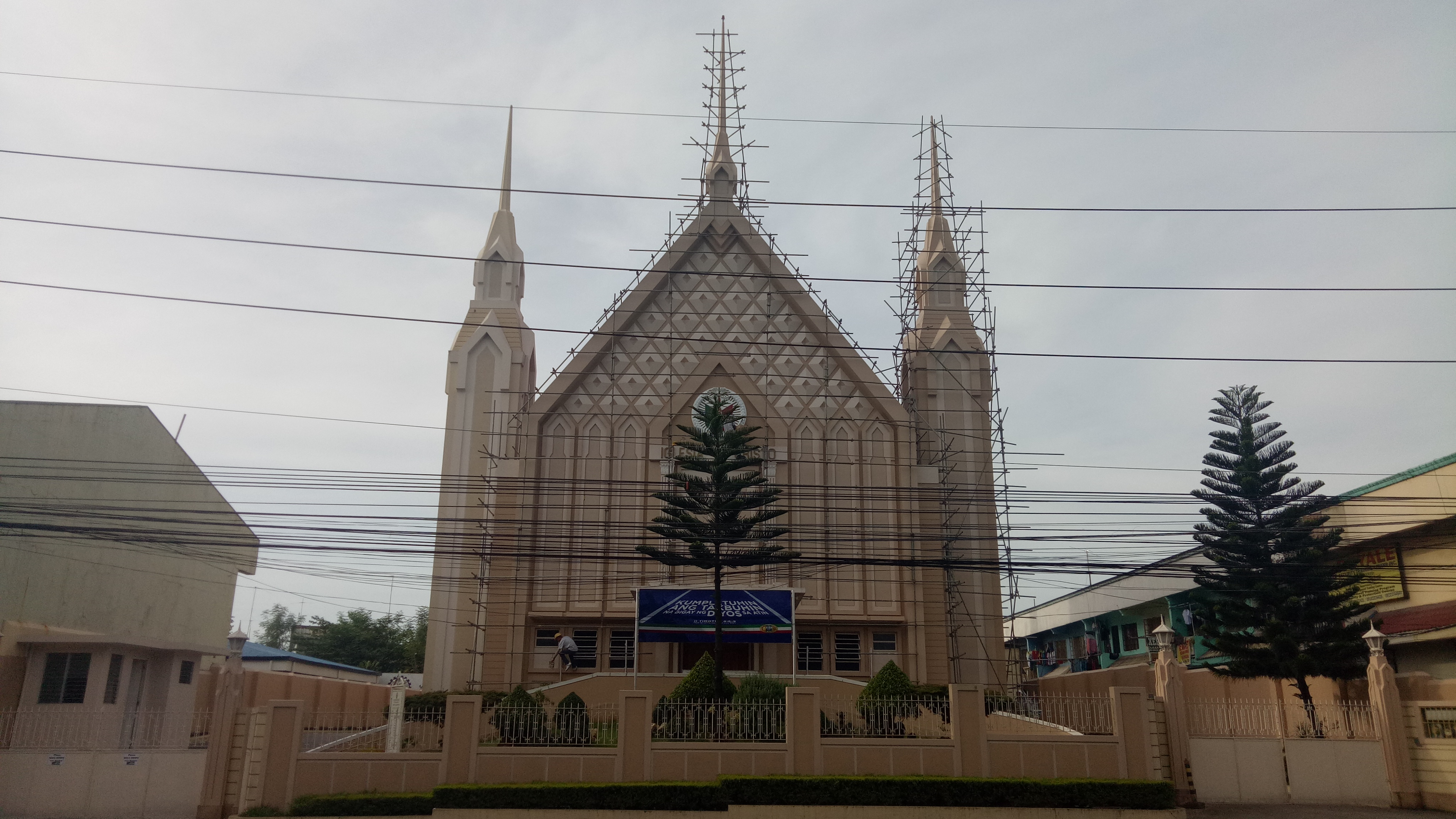
Iglesia ni Cristo–Mayapa Church

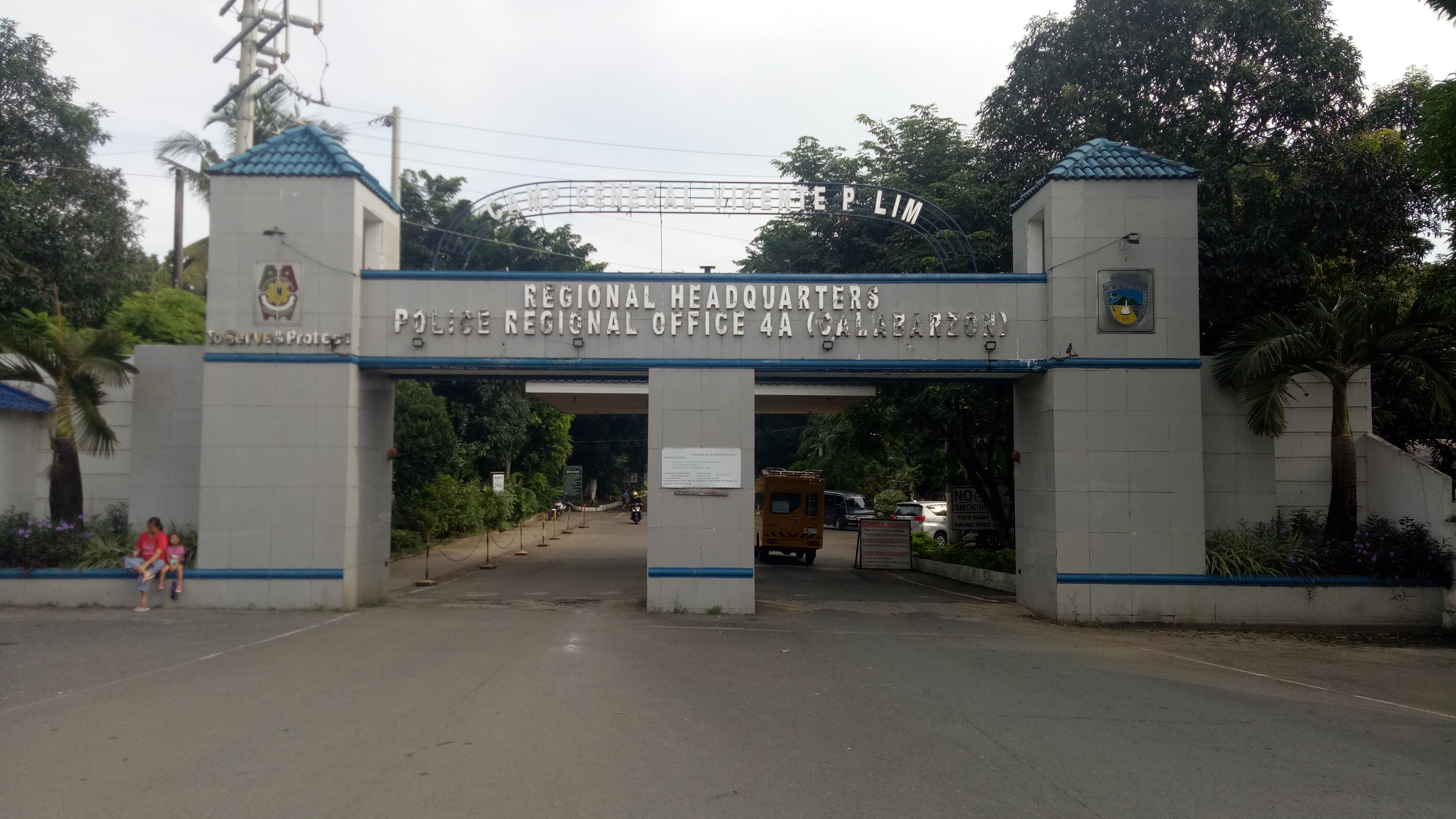
Camp Gen. Vicente P. Lim Gate 1

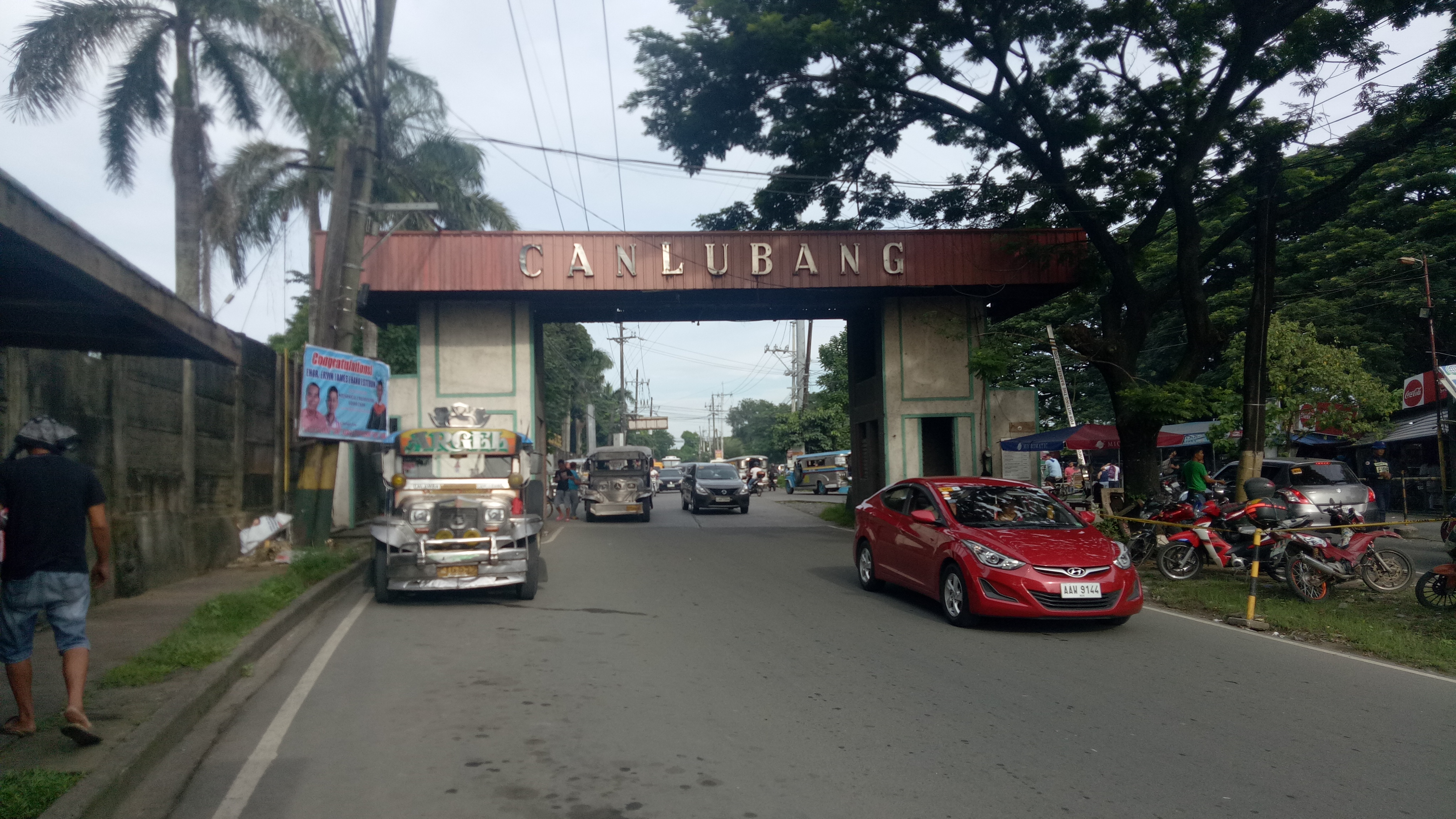
Barangay Canlubang welcome arch denotes the west end of Mayapa–Canlubang Cadre Road
