= Silangan Industrial Park =

Silangan Industrial Park Canlubang Industrial Estate
- Industrial park
- (SIP)
- Location of Carmelray Industrial Park 1 within the Philippines
- Coordinates: 14°11′31″N 121°4′16″E
- Country: Philippines
- Region: Calabarzon (Region IV-A)
- Province: Laguna
- City: Calamba
- Barangay: Canlubang
- Sitio: Silangan Village

Government
  - Mayor: Timmy Chipeco
  - Vice Mayor: Roseller H. Rizal
  - Chairman: Larry O. Dimayuga

Silangan Industrial Park, also known as Canlubang Industrial Estate, is an industrial zone located at barangay Canlubang, Calamba, Laguna. It is situated at Silangan Industrial Avenue and Jose Yulo Avenue.

Silangan Industrial has numerous plants, factories and subdivisions. It is bounded by Laguna Industrial and Science Park (LISP)-1 and Calamba Premiere International Park (CPIP)-1.

== Canlubang Airstrip ==
The Silangan Airstrip Industrial Estate or also known as Calamba Airfield was a former airstrip used by the military around the 1940s, when the sugar estate was established under Jose Yulo. The airstrip has been since defunct, due to the proposed development of industrial parks, factories, plants and subdivisions. It is the second largest science park in Laguna, behind the LISP in Terelay, Cabuyao; and is closely bounded by the San Cristobal River.

== Locators ==
Companies
ACS Manufacturing Corp.
Alcem Insecticed Corp.
Amresco Commercial and Industrial Corp.
Argio Watsons Glass, Inc.
Baxter Health
Bayer Employees Multi-Porpos
Bayer Philippines., Inc.
Champion Powder Product, Corp.
Cosmos Bottling Corp.
Elline Food Products
Interphil Laboratories plant 2
Laguna Carparts (MFG), Inc.
Macro Ind L. Packing
Mega Packaging Corp.
Microchip Technology Operations (Philippines) Corporation
Newpro Industrial Manufacturing
Pepmaco Manufacturing Corporation
Plasman Corp.
San Miguel Yamamura Packing Corp.
Storck Product Corp. (SPI)
Sunrich Commercial Corp.
Yunex Printed Circuit Corp.
