= Bayanan, Muntinlupa =

Barangay in Muntinlupa City, Metro Manila, Philippines

Bayanan
- Barangay
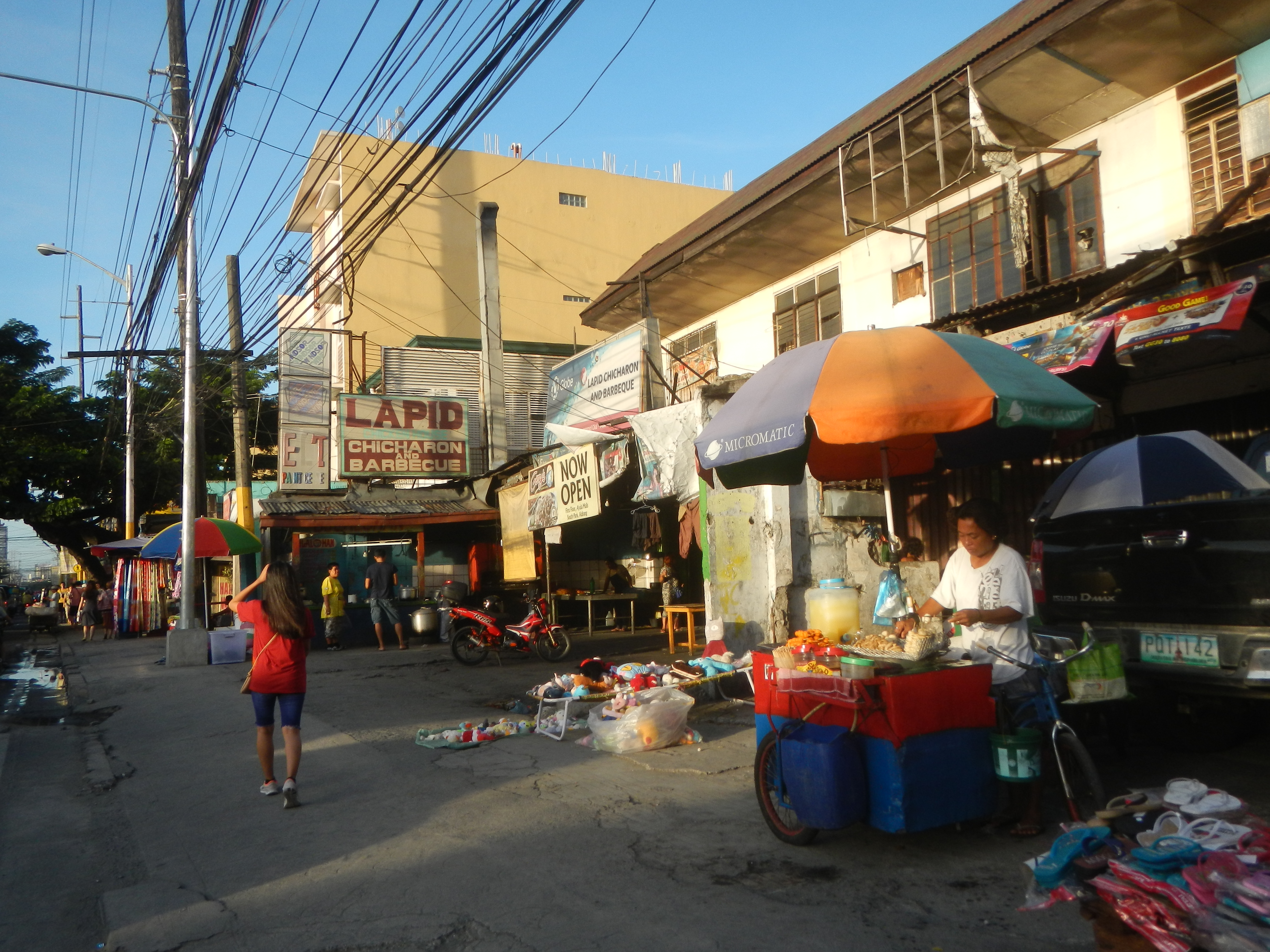
- Barangay Bayanan Market
- Interactive map of Bayanan
- Coordinates: 14°24′28.07″N 121°2′59.9″E
- Country: Philippines
- Region: National Capital Region
- City: Muntinlupa
- District: 1st Legislative district of Muntinlupa

Government
  - Type: Barangay
  - Barangay Captain: Jonathan Gutierrez
  - SK Chairperson: Gab Lorica

Area
  - Total: 0.784 km^{2} (0.303 sq mi)

Population (2020)
  - Total: 39,150
  - Density: 49,900/km^{2} (129,000/sq mi)
- Time zone: UTC+8 (PST)
- Postal Code: 1772
- Area code: 02

Bayanan is a barangay in the Muntinlupa, Philippines. It has a total land area of 0.784 km^{2} (0.303 sq mi), making it the city's second smallest barangay in terms of land area. As of 2020, it has a population of 39,150.

== Etymology ==
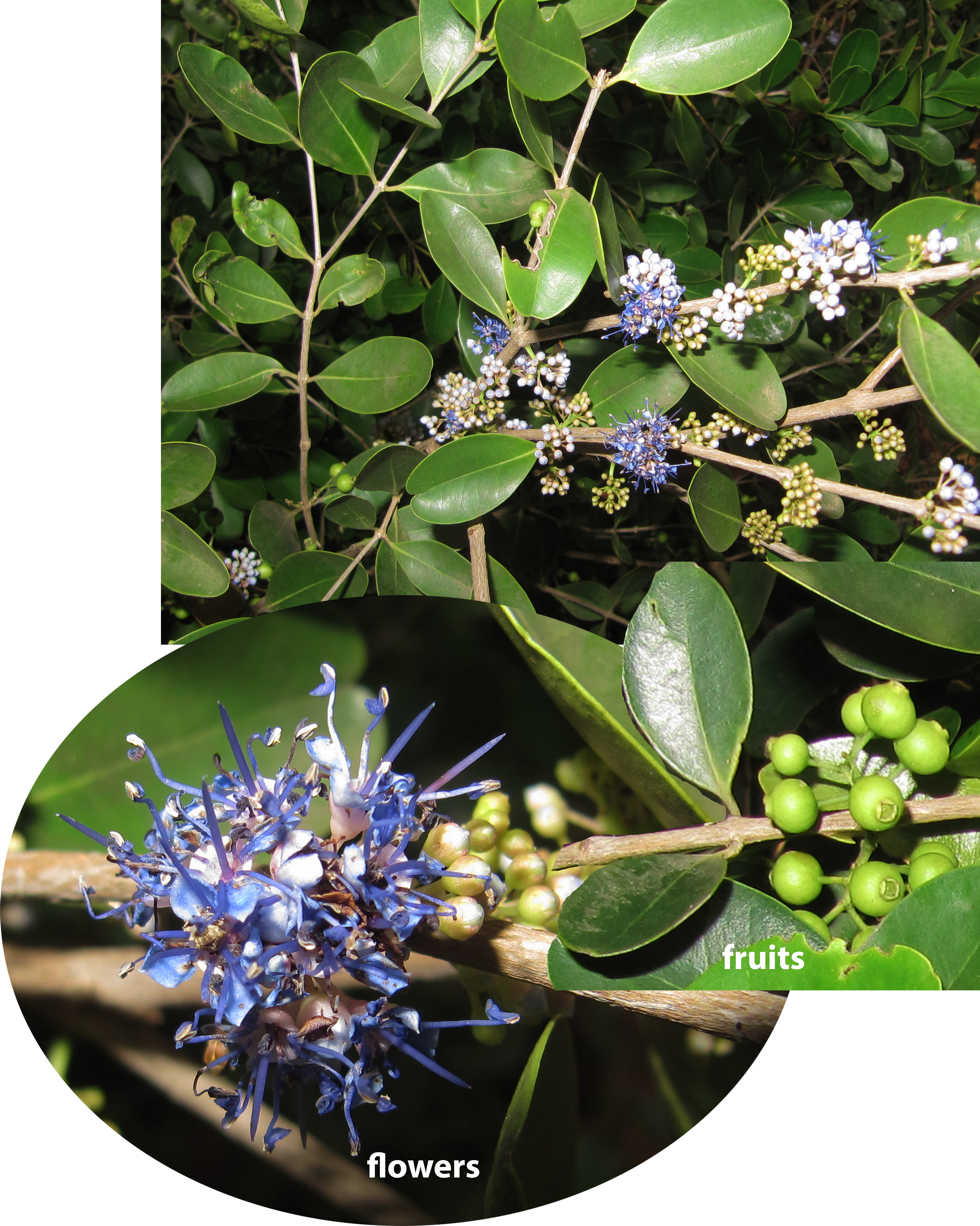
báyan plant

Bayanan is said to be named after the báyan plant that grows in the area. It was first known as Bayan-bayanan before it was shortened to its present name.

== History ==
Bayanan, an old fishing and farming village, was the old municipal center of Muntinlupa before it was moved to Poblacion.

== Demographics ==
Year	Population
2007	35,865
2010	35,392
2015	36,673
2020	39,150
2024	38,358

== Subdivisions ==
While barangays are the administrative divisions of the city, and are legally part of the addresses of establishments and homes, residents also include their subdivision. Listed below are subdivisions in this barangay.
