= NAIA Expressway =

Expressway in the Philippines

Coordinates: 14°31′15″N 121°1′21″E

NAIA Expressway

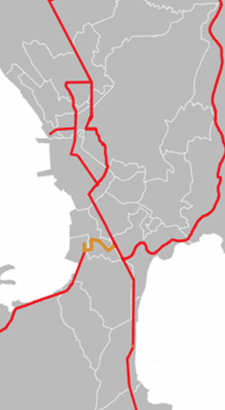
- A map of expressways in Metro Manila, with the NAIA Expressway in orange

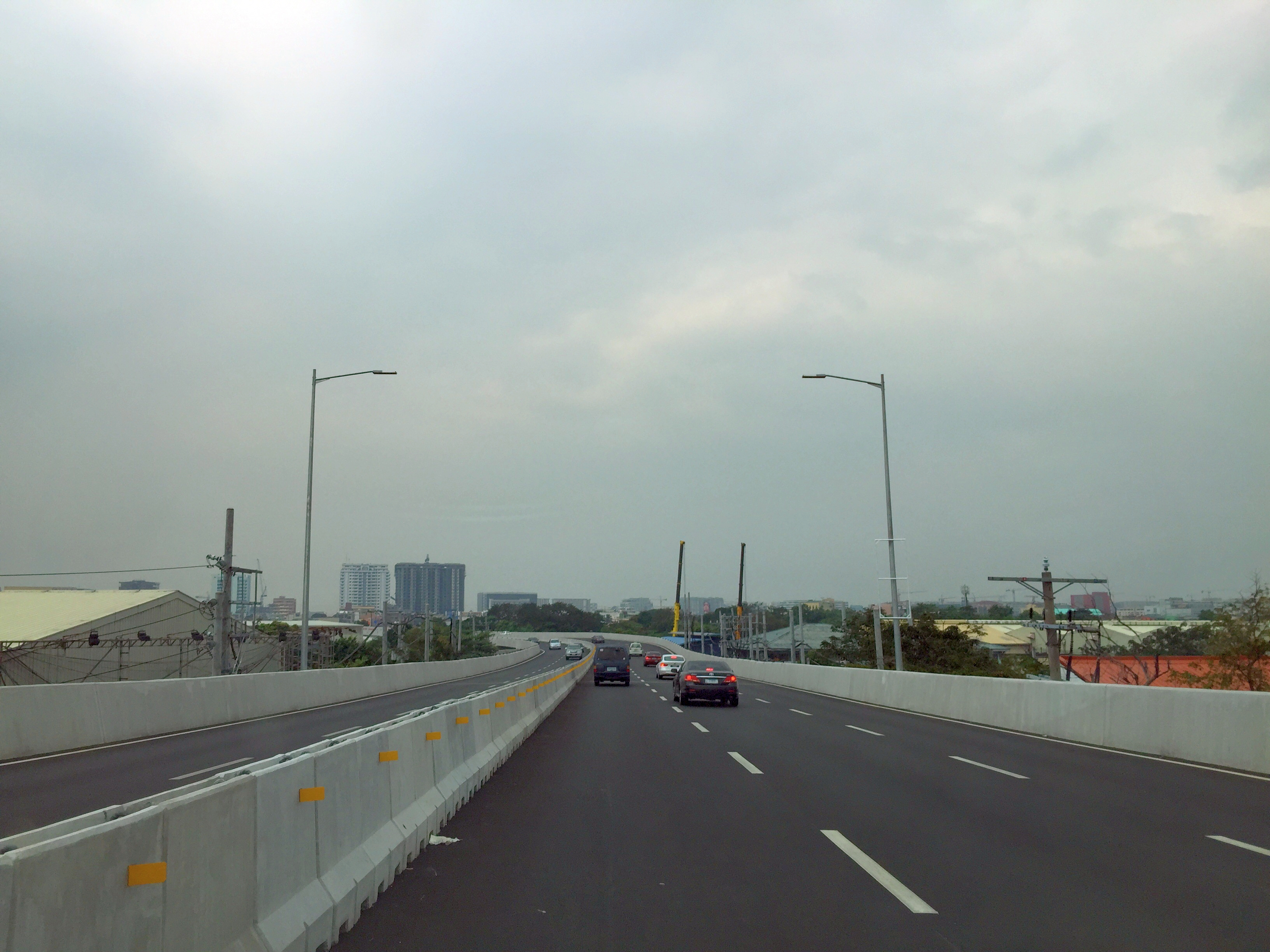
- NAIA Expressway, looking south towards NAIA Road from Andrews Avenue in Pasay

Route information
- Maintained by Skyway Operations & Maintenance Corporation (SOMCo)
- Length: 12.65 km (7.86 mi)
- Existed: 2016–present
- Restrictions: No motorcycles below 400cc, passenger jeepneys, and closed light trucks

Major junctions
- West end: Entertainment City in Parañaque
- East end: AH26 (Skyway) at Sales Interchange in Taguig–Pasay boundary

Location
- Country: Philippines
- Major cities: Parañaque and Pasay

Highway system
- Roads in the Philippines; Highways; Expressways; List
| ← E5 |

The NAIA Expressway (NAIAX), signed as Expressway 6 (E6) of the Philippine expressway network, is a 12.65-kilometer (7.86 mi) elevated highway in Metro Manila, Philippines. It opened in September 2016, becoming the first airport expressway in the country. Traversing the cities of Pasay and Parañaque, the expressway provides a direct connection between the Manila–Cavite Expressway (CAVITEX) and the Skyway, while also providing access to Ninoy Aquino International Airport (NAIA), hence its name, and Entertainment City.

== Route description ==
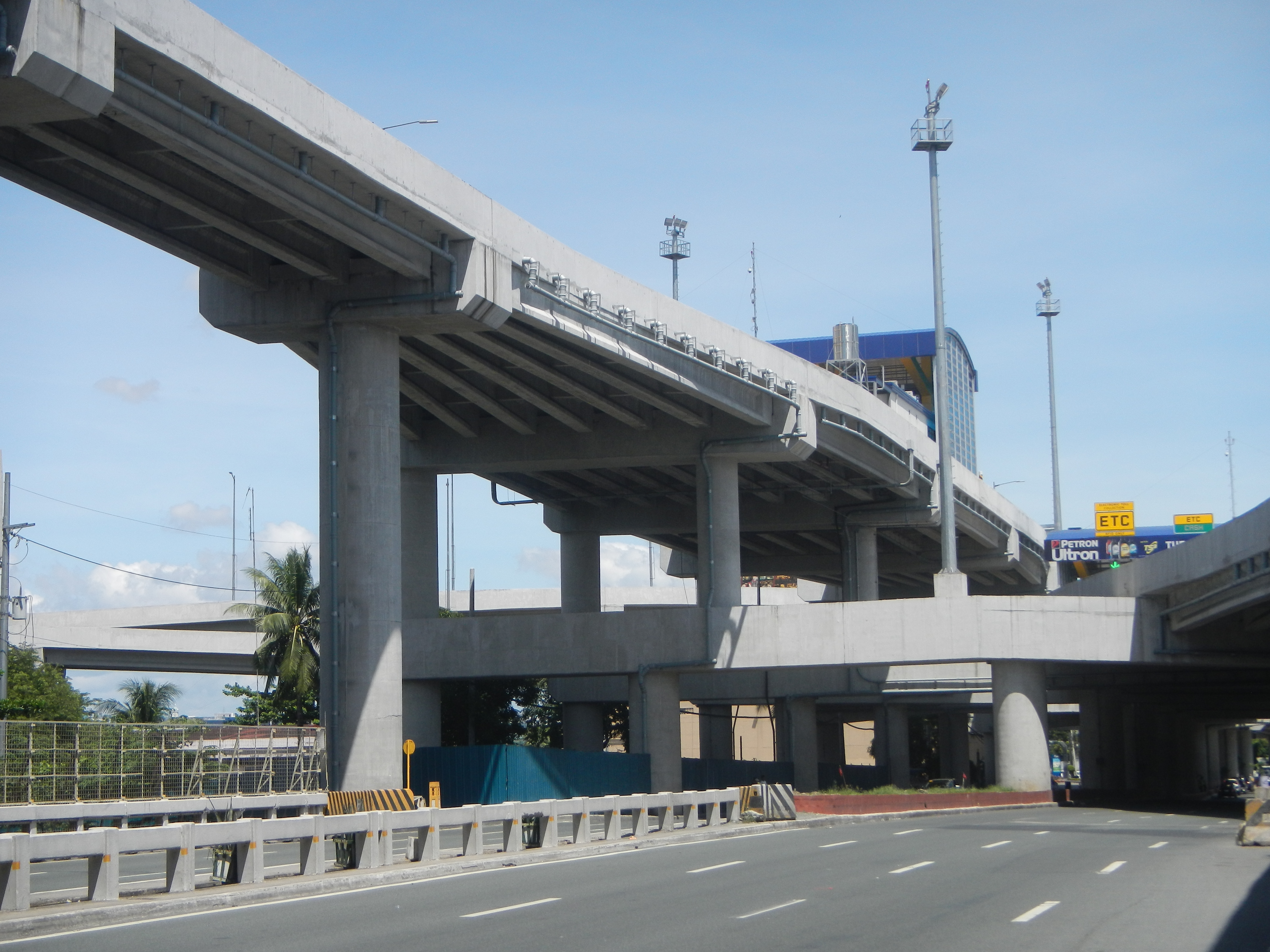
The elevated expressway as seen from street level

From the Sales Interchange (NAIA Exit) of Skyway, the expressway heads to the southwest and runs along Sales Road across Villamor Airbase and Newport City. It then curves to the northwest on Andrews Avenue towards the entrance to NAIA Terminal 3 and continues along the northern perimeter of the airport towards Electrical Road. From here, it turns south and runs along the Parañaque River, parallel to Domestic Road on the east towards the NAIA Road junction. From this junction, the expressway branches into two, with one traversing eastwards to NAIA Terminals 1 and 2, while the other continues westwards to Entertainment City and the Manila–Cavite Expressway.

== Features ==
The expressway is operated and maintained by Skyway Operations & Maintenance Corporation (SOMCo), the same company that operates Skyway, while its concession holder is SMC NAIAX Corporation (formerly Vertex Tollways Development, Inc.); both companies are subsidiaries of San Miguel Corporation (SMC).

=== Lanes ===
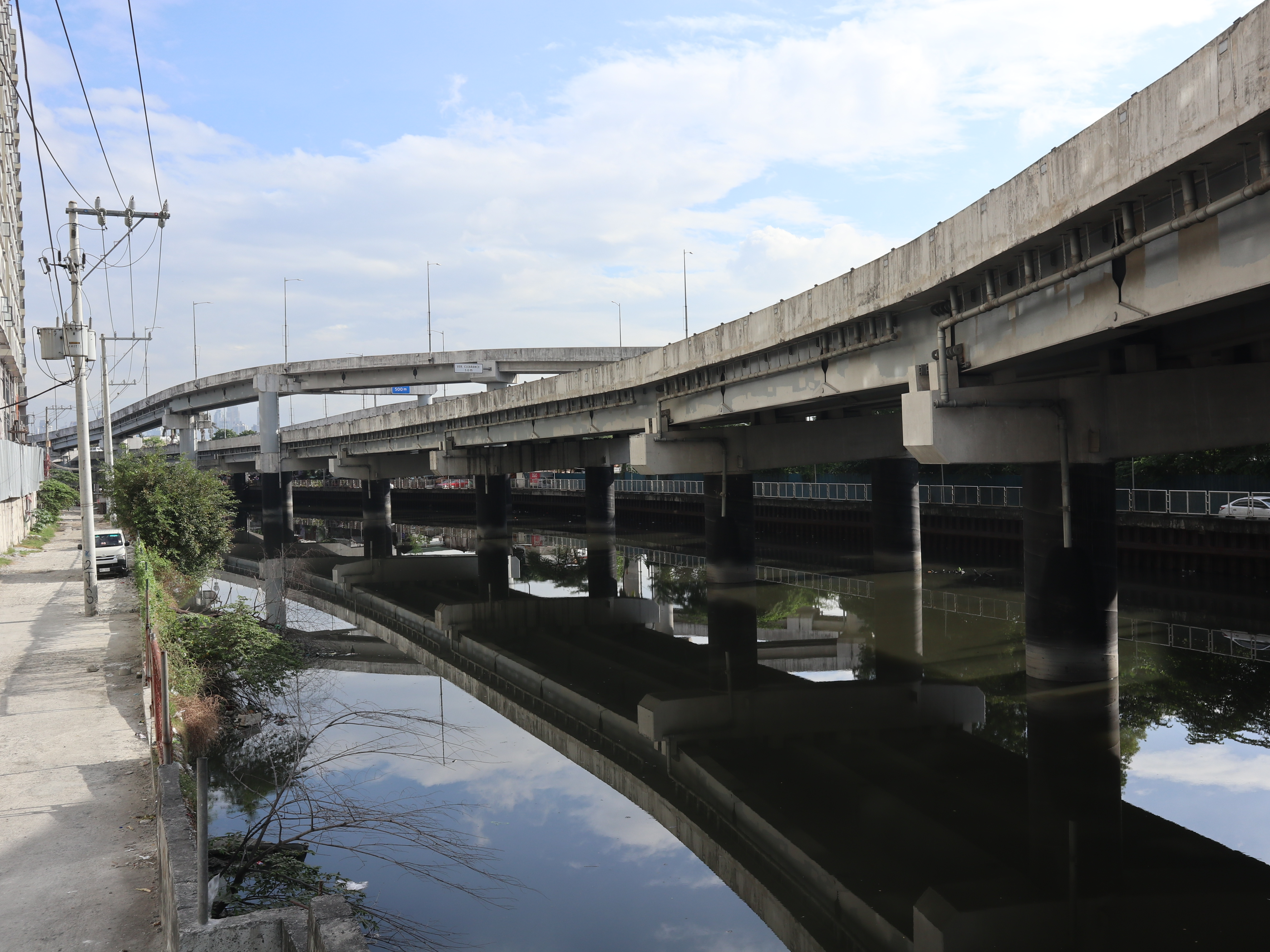
Portion of the NAIA Expressway above the Parañaque River.

Before the opening of the Skyway expansion project (by eliminating shoulders and shrinking the median) in 2020 that widened the expressway to 7 lanes, and due to the lack of right of way available for the project, NAIAX is the second expressway that does not have a shoulder, after North Luzon Expressway's southern segment between Balintawak and Tabang Interchange in Balagtas, and the first expressway having a narrow concrete barrier as median. Even though SMC claims that NAIAX is a 4-lane elevated expressway, SMC, via its subsidiary, Vertex Tollways Development, has built 5 to 7 lanes on the expressway without shoulders and with a narrow median barrier, with the configurations listed below.

==== 5-lane zones ====
- 2 lanes to Macapagal Boulevard/NAIA Interchange (catering to motorist to/from NAIA Terminal 1 and 2) and 3 lanes to Skyway for (1) half part of the expressway's Parañaque River alignment and (2) the alignment from NAIA Terminal 3 exit (±500 m (1,600 ft) before the exit) to Andrew Ave off-ramp; the first part is configurated to tackle the possible traffic jam by the merging of NAIAX from the airport and Macapagal Boulevard
- 3 lanes to NAIA Interchange and 2 lanes to Skyway for another half part of the river alignment and above Airport Road to NAIA Terminal 3 Exit
- 2 lanes to NAIA Interchange and 3 lanes to Macapagal Boulevard west of NAIA Interchange

==== 7-lane zones ====
These zones are actually 5 lanes with an acceleration lane for each direction to cater vehicles transferring between interchanges that are close to each other.

- from NAIA interchange to NAIAX-CAVITEX Interchange, where 4 lanes go westbound and 3 lanes go eastbound (to NAIA)
- from Skyway to Andrews Avenue off-ramp, where 4 lanes go westbound (to NAIA) and 3 lanes go eastbound

=== Speed limit ===
The maximum speed is 60 kilometers per hour (37 mph). The expressway has an overhead speed gantry so drivers can see the speed they cruise on; the gantry is located near the eastbound off-ramp to NAIA Terminal 3.

== History ==
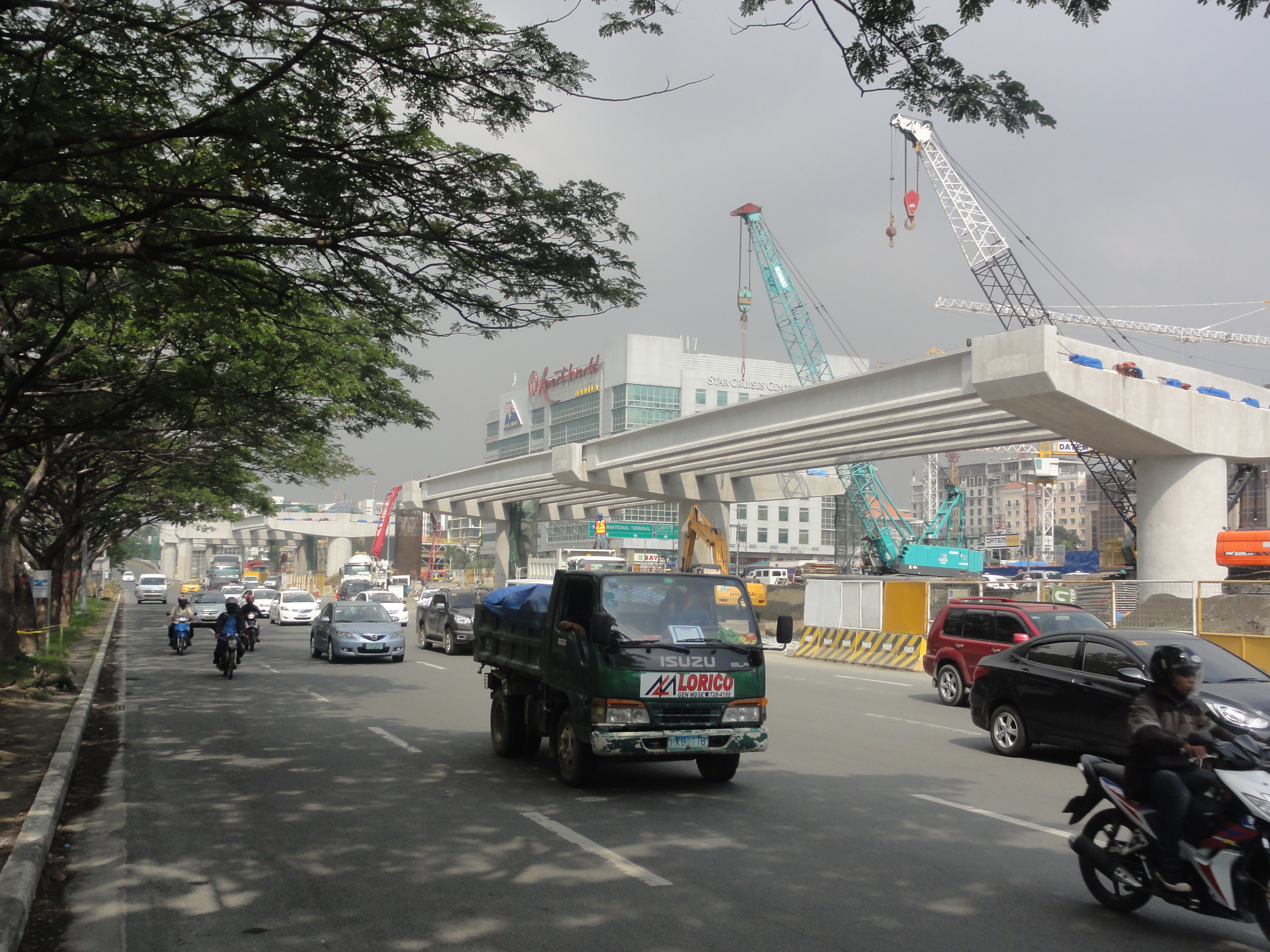
Under-construction segment of the expressway along Andrews Avenue in front of the Newport World Resorts in 2014

Before its development, the 1999 Metro Manila Urban Transportation Integrated Study recommended the construction of an interchange at Skyway leading to Terminal 3 of Ninoy Aquino International Airport.

On July 17, 2001, President Gloria Macapagal Arroyo and her Cabinet approved the construction of the NAIA Expressway, funded through a Japanese loan package, and construction of its interchange with Skyway began on March 17, 2004. Construction of the 1.6-kilometer (0.99 mi) NAIA Expressway Phase 1 (NAIA Terminal 3 Exit of Skyway) was completed and inaugurated on May 30, 2009. It provided an entry/exit ramp to the then-newly-opened NAIA Terminal 3 and Resorts World Manila (now Newport World Resorts).

Phase 2 of the NAIA Expressway project was approved by the National Economic and Development Authority board during the presidency of Benigno Aquino III on May 30, 2012. It included a 4.83-kilometer (3.00 mi) extension of the expressway to Macapagal Boulevard in Entertainment City, Parañaque. The project was funded through a public-private partnership (PPP) scheme, with San Miguel Corporation winning the bidding for its construction, operation and maintenance. DMCI is the only contractor responsible for the project.

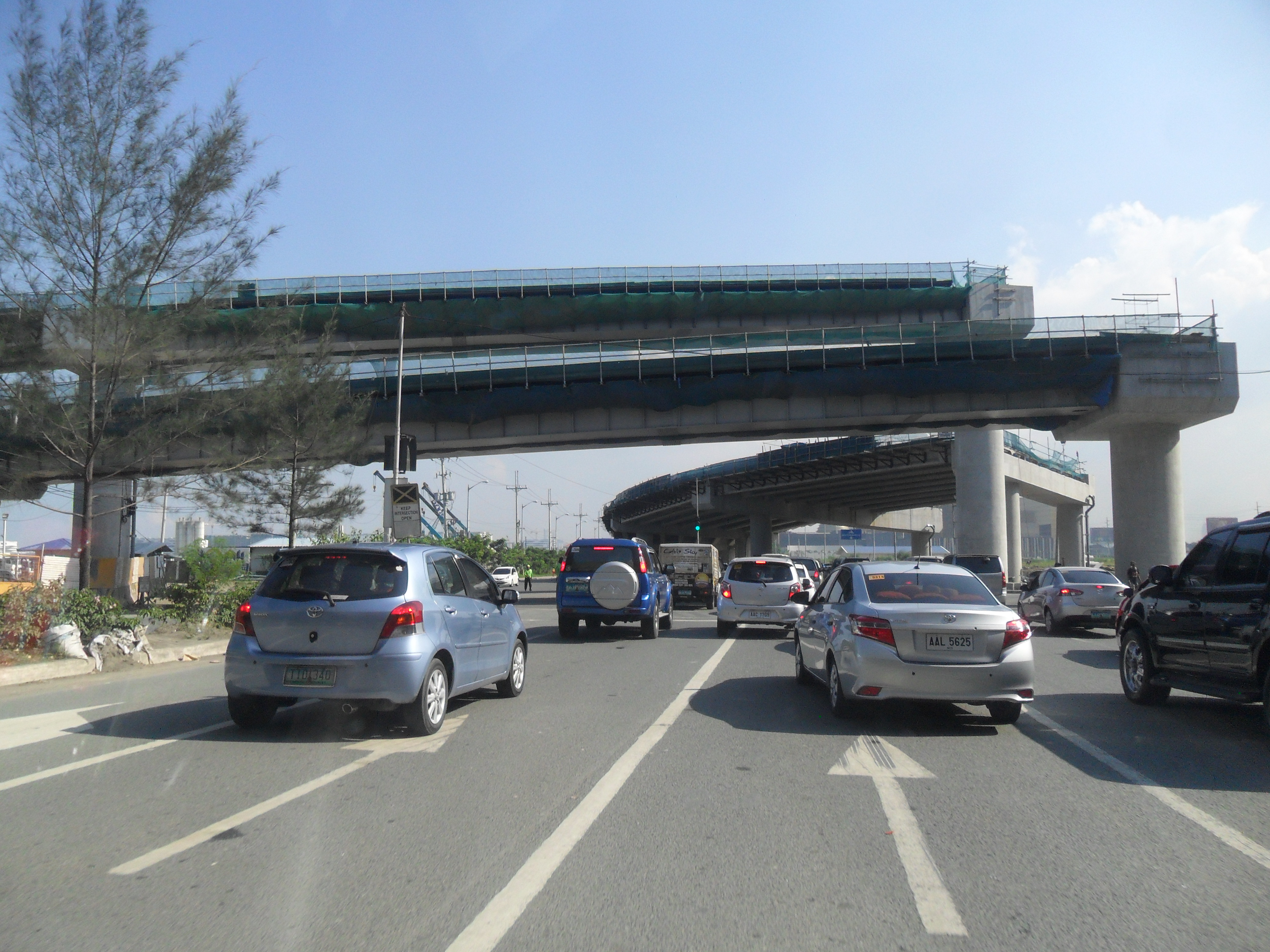
Under-construction segment of the expressway along Macapagal Boulevard in 2015

On January 2, 2014, construction began on Phase 2 of the NAIA Expressway. On September 22, 2016, at exactly 12:01 AM (PHT), the second phase of the airport expressway from Macapagal Boulevard to NAIA Terminals 1 and 2 was opened to all motorists and airport passengers rushing to their flights to avoid the traffic lights at every intersection along NAIA Road. Toll collection at the NAIAX began on October 22, exactly one month later.

On November 28, 2016, the on-ramp of the expressway's western terminus was removed as the new on-ramp in the expressway opened on November 4.

On December 21, 2016, at exactly 6:00 AM (PHT), the Entertainment City-NAIA Road-SLEX-Skyway segment (including the access ramp to Terminal 3) of the airport expressway was opened to all motorists for the Christmas rush. On December 28, 2016, the access ramps to and from Manila–Cavite Expressway (CAVITEX) were also opened to all motorists to provide easier access from the province of Cavite and Las Piñas to NAIA Terminals 1, 2 and 3 and vice versa.

On June 1, 2017, NAIAX was fully opened to all motorists. By the full opening of NAIAX, CAVITEX was ultimately connected to Skyway and the international airport. Since the opening of Skyway Stage 3 in 2020, the airport has been connected to the North Luzon Expressway (NLEX), with Skyway and NAIAX providing seamless travel to and from the airport, including Clark International Airport in Pampanga.

On March 1, 2024, an additional westbound on-ramp from Tramo Street in Pasay was opened to motorists. On March 27, 2026, an additional westbound off-ramp to NAIA Terminal 3 was opened.

== Future ==
San Miguel Corporation proposed an expansion of the expressway to Bonifacio Global City (BGC), Taguig in 2017. Planned to traverse above Lawton Avenue, this expansion aims to reduce traffic along Sales Road and Sales Interchange and help reduce travel time from the airport to BGC to 10 minutes from the initial 30 minutes to 1 hour. The project also includes constructing additional NAIAX ramps from the NAIA Terminals 1 and 2 exit ramps to C-5 Road Extension and CAVITEX C-5 Link via Ninoy Aquino Avenue. This project is part of SMC's three-year expansion project of all toll roads in southern Metro Manila to decrease traffic congestion on the area's major thoroughfares. As of 2026, the project is still waiting for a green light/approval for it to be under construction.

NAIAX's toll system is also planned to be integrated with the South Luzon Expressway, Skyway, Muntinlupa–Cavite Expressway, and STAR Tollway under SMC's Seamless Southern Tollways program, wherein motorists will pay upon exit from NAIAX or any of the aforementioned expressways.

== Tolls ==
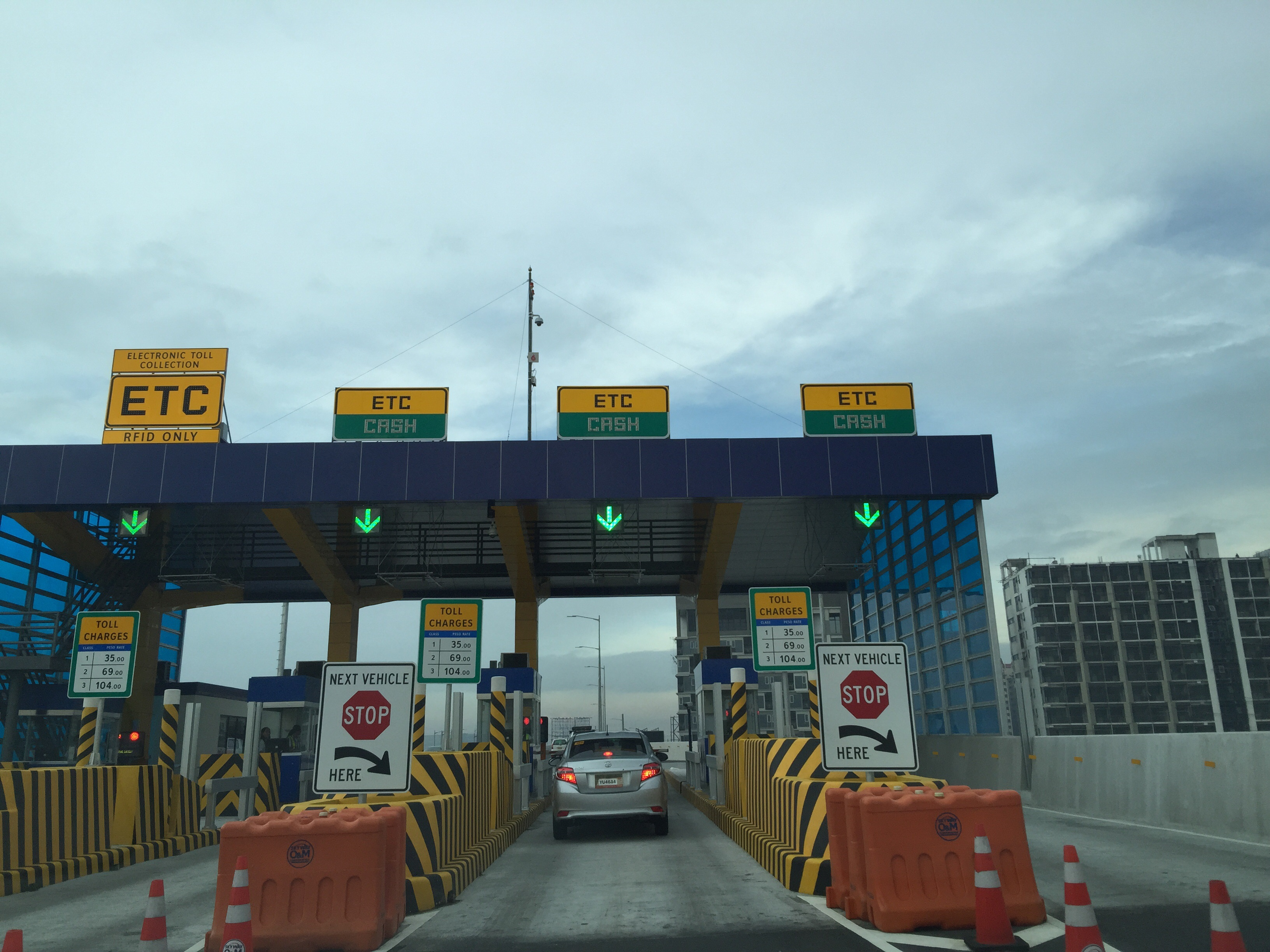
Toll booth at the NAIA Terminals 1 & 2 on-ramp

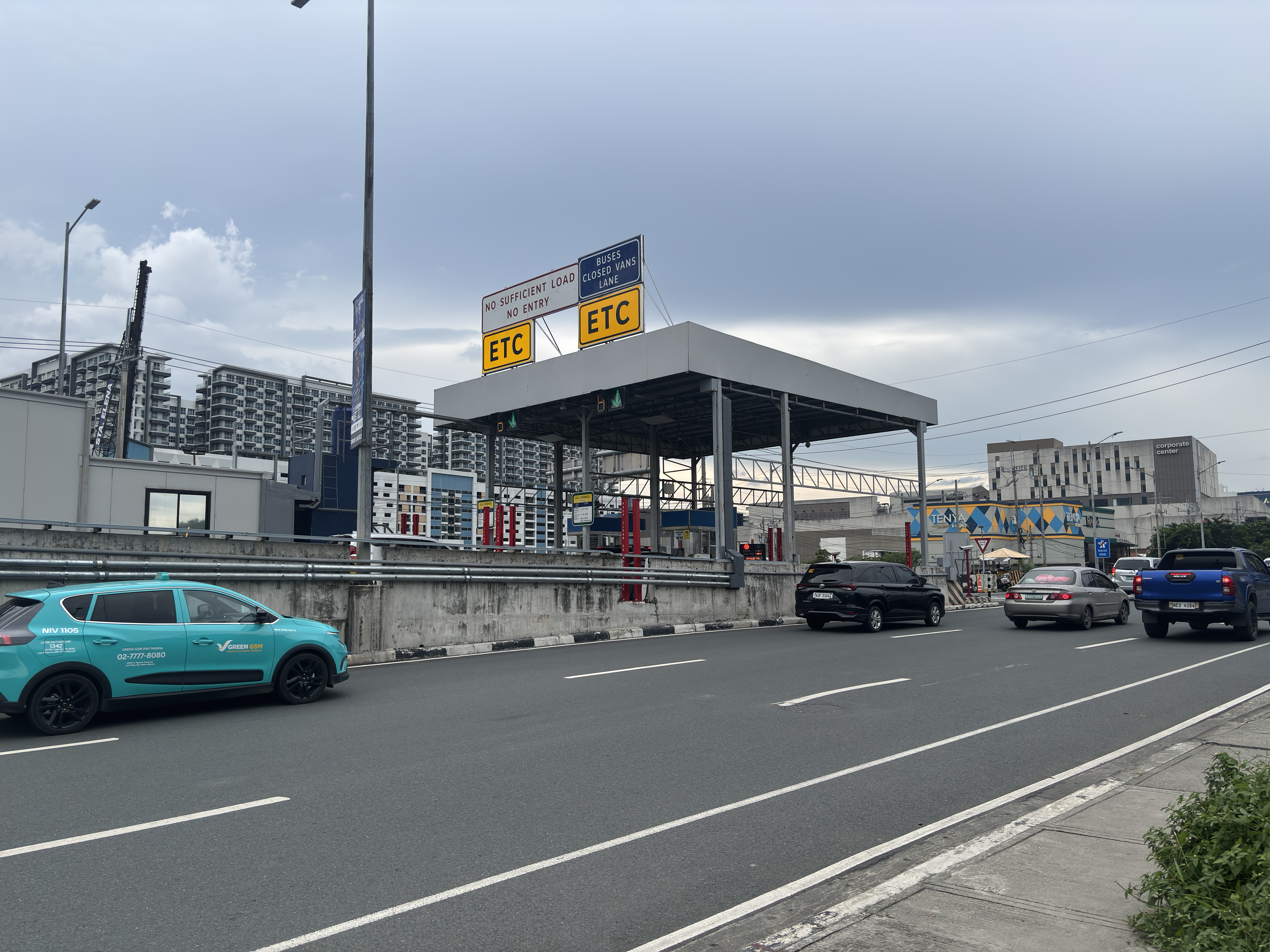
Toll booth at the Macapagal off-ramp

NAIAX uses a barrier toll system, where toll collection is done at toll barriers on a fixed rate based on the vehicle class and distance travelled using it. Both westbound and eastbound lanes of NAIAX employ toll collection at its main toll plaza near Newport City and upon exit. This scheme is implemented since March 2024, but was temporarily discontinued from May 17, 2024, due to build-up at the exits, prompting expansion work that was completed in August 2025. The expressway fully implements an electronic toll collection (ETC) system, Autosweep RFID, utilizing RFID technology. The ETC system is shared with Skyway, SLEX, STAR Tollway, MCX and TPLEX.

=== NAIAX rates (July 2017 – present) ===
| Class | Short Segment | Full Route |
|---|---|---|
| Class 1 (Cars, Motorcycles, SUVs, Jeepneys) | ₱35.00 | ₱45.00 |
| Class 2 (Buses, Light Trucks) | ₱69.00 | ₱90.00 |
| Class 3 (Heavy Trucks) | ₱104.00 | ₱134.00 |

=== Skyway system rates (until July 2017) ===
| Class | Toll |
|---|---|
| Class 1 (Cars, Motorcycles, SUVs, Jeepneys) | ₱20.00 |
| Class 2 (Buses, Light Trucks) | ₱40.00 |

== Exits ==
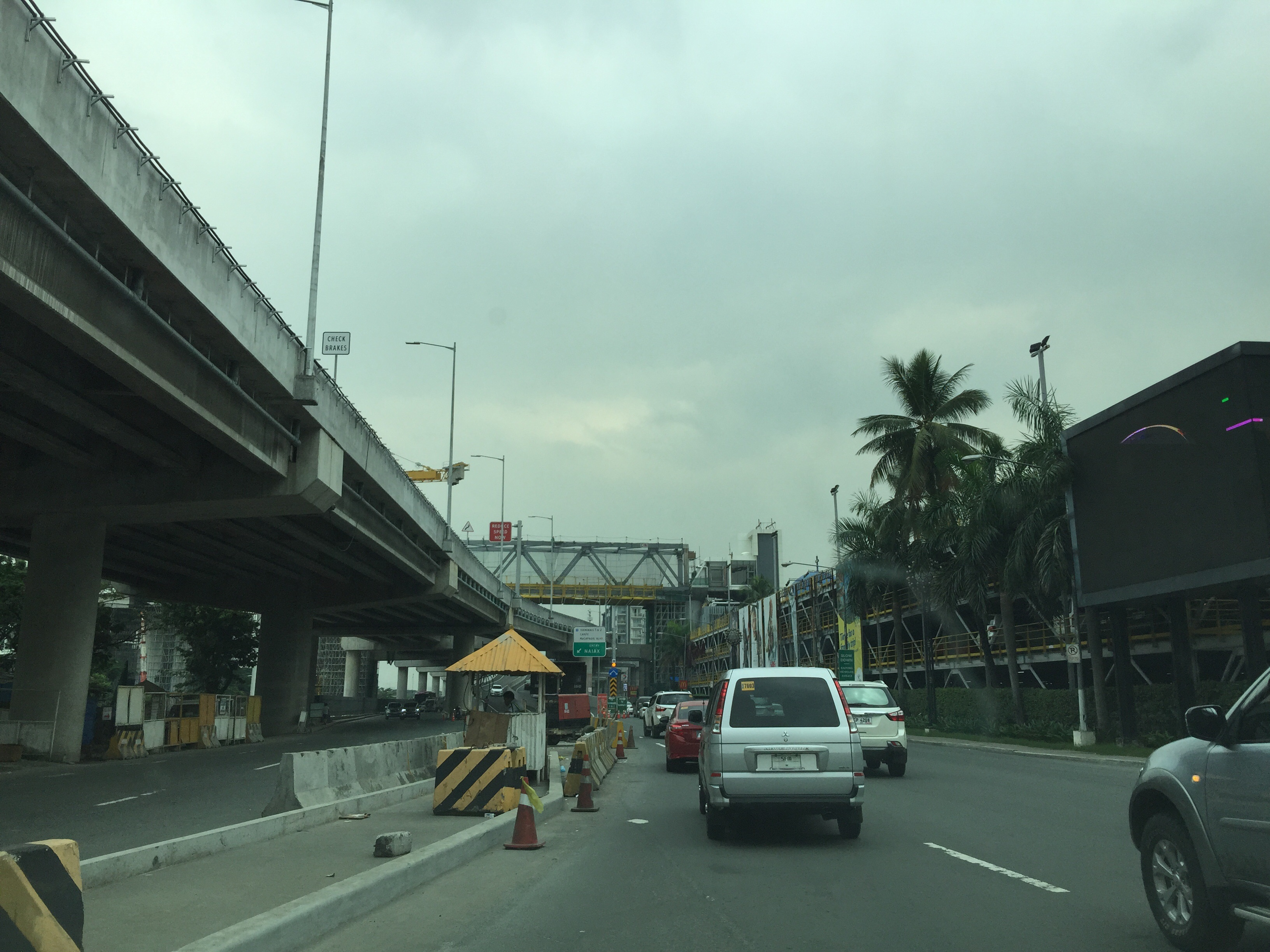
NAIA Expressway ramp on Andrews Avenue

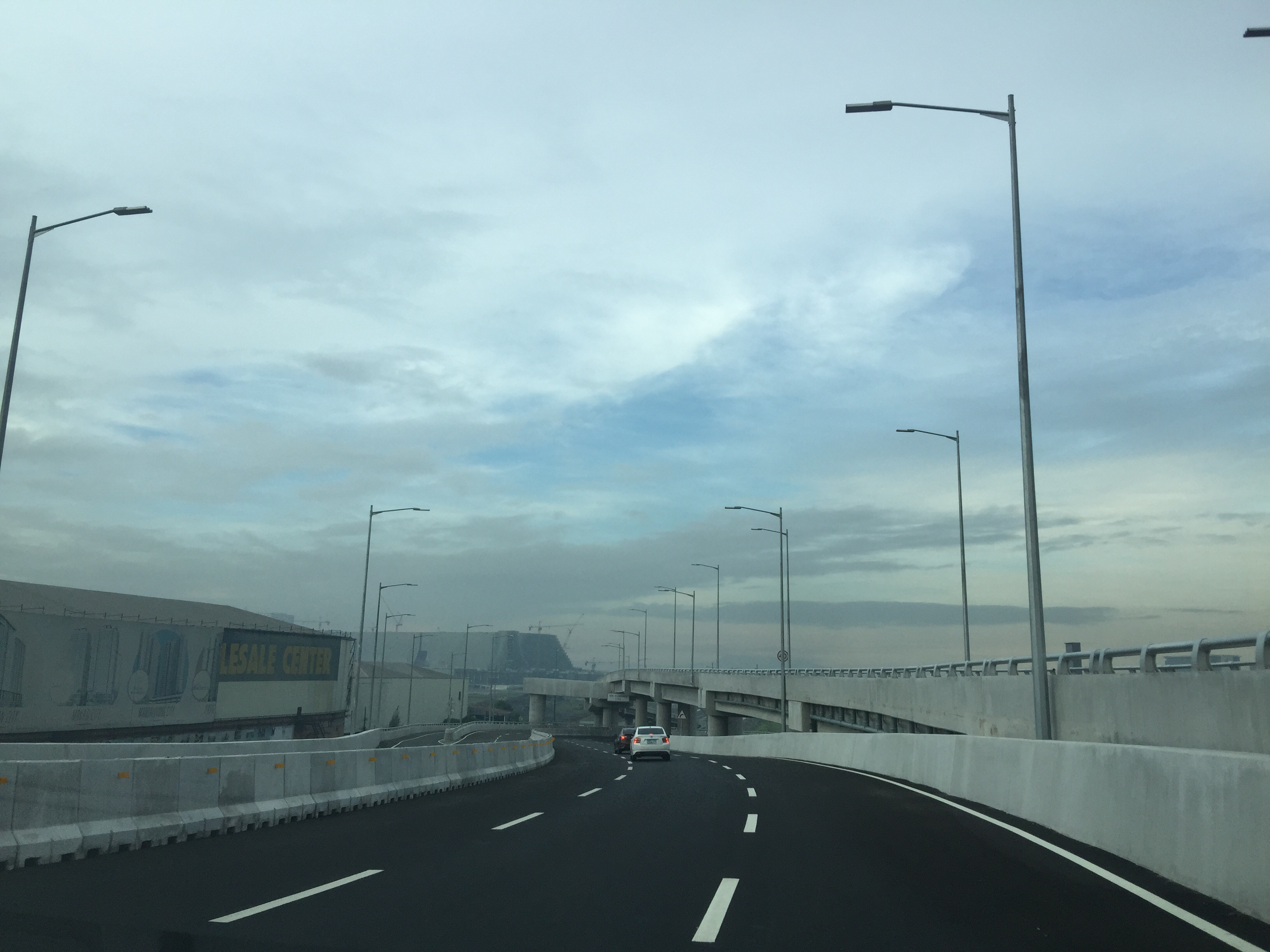
On the Macapagal off-ramp looking towards Okada Manila

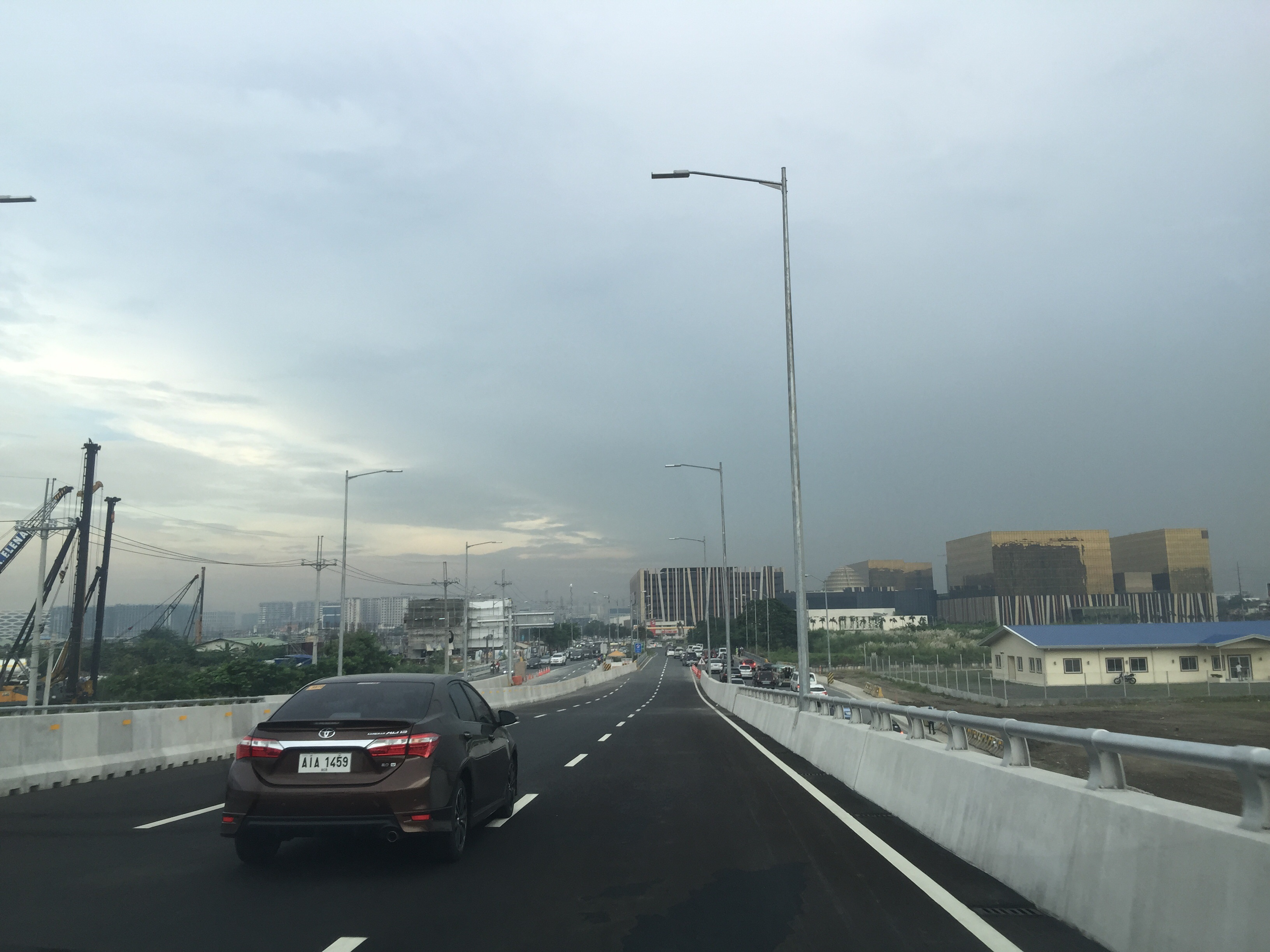
Macapagal off-ramp looking north

This entire route is located in Metro Manila. Exits are numbered by kilometer posts at the center of the expressway, with Rizal Park in Manila designated as kilometer zero.

| Province | City/Municipality | km | mi | Exit | Name | Destinations | Notes |
|---|---|---|---|---|---|---|---|
| Taguig | | | | | | Lawton Avenue/BGC | Eastbound exit and westbound entrance; extension to Skyway Stage 4 (BGC) via Lawton Avenue; future eastern terminus |
| Pasay – Taguig boundary | | 9.15 | 5.69 | | Sales Interchange (Skyway / NAIAX) | AH26 (Skyway) – Makati, Alabang, Balintawak | Directional T interchange; current eastern terminus |
| Pasay | | | | NAIAX toll plaza A (westbound only, 2016–2022) | | | |
| Pasay | | 9.26 | 5.75 | NAIAX toll plaza B (eastbound only, 2016–2022) | | | |
| Pasay | | 8.9 | 5.5 | | Andrews Avenue | N192 (Andrews Avenue) – NAIA Terminal 3 | Westbound exit and eastbound entrance |
| Pasay | | | | | | N192 (Andrews Avenue) – Sales, BGC | Westbound entrance only (Used to be Westbound entry and Eastbound exit) |
| Pasay | | | | NAIAX Main Toll Plaza Westbound (Newport) (westbound pass-thru) | | | |
| Pasay | | 7.7 | 4.8 | NAIAX Main Toll Plaza Eastbound Alpha/Bravo (Newport) (eastbound only 1 pass thru lane 5 ETC Lanes and 4 more ETC Lanes behind the Westbound Toll Plaza) | | | |
| Pasay | | 7.2– 7.65 | 4.5– 4.75 | | Terminal 3 | N192 (Andrews Avenue) – NAIA Terminal 3 | Westbound exit and eastbound exit only |
| Pasay | | | | | Tramo | N171 (Aurora Boulevard) | Westbound entrance; construction of eastbound exit pending |
| Pasay – Parañaque boundary | | | | | Terminal 1 / Terminal 2 | N194 (NAIA Road) / N195 (Ninoy Aquino Avenue) – NAIA Terminals 1 & 2, Sucat Road | Directional T interchange |
| Parañaque | | 4.5 | 2.8 | | Cavite | E3 (CAVITEX) – Cavite | Westbound exit and eastbound entrance; future connection with Southern Access Link Expressway (SALEX) |
| Parañaque | | 4.1 | 2.5 | | Entertainment City | New Seaside Drive | Westbound exit and eastbound entrance |
| Parañaque | | 4.1– 3.8 | 2.5– 2.4 | | Macapagal | Macapagal Boulevard | Westbound exit and eastbound entrance; western terminus |
1.000 mi = 1.609 km; 1.000 km = 0.621 mi: Closed/former; Incomplete access; Tolled; Unopened
