= Andrews Avenue =

Road in Metro Manila, Philippines

Coordinates: 14°31′25″N 121°0′39″E

Andrews Avenue
- Nichols Road
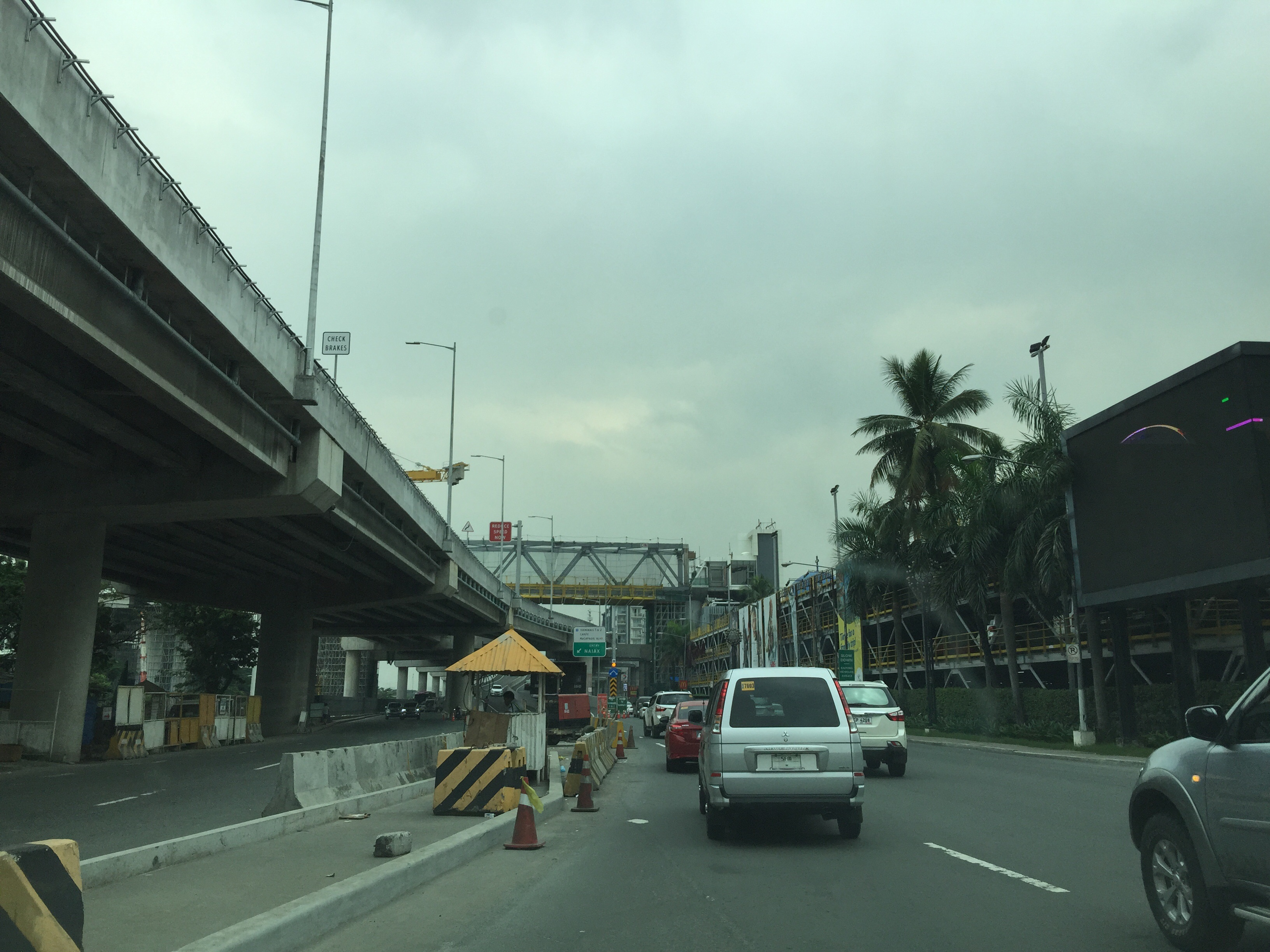
- Andrews Avenue, looking west near Newport City with the elevated NAIA Expressway

Route information
- Maintained by Department of Public Works and Highways - South Manila District Engineering Office
- Length: 4.3 km (2.7 mi)

Major junctions
- West end: N61 (Roxas Boulevard) in Baclaran, Parañaque (as Airport Road)
- N193 (Domestic Road); N171 (Aurora Boulevard); N192 (Balagbag Road)
- East end: West Service Road at Sales Interchange, Pasay (as Sales Road)

Location
- Country: Philippines
- Named after: Frank Maxwell Andrews
- Major cities: Parañaque and Pasay

Highway system
- Roads in the Philippines; Highways; Expressways; List
← N191	→ N193

Andrews Avenue (formerly and still commonly known as Nichols Road) is a major east-west thoroughfare in Metro Manila, Philippines that functions as a metropolitan linkage between Pasay and Taguig. It runs underneath the NAIA Expressway almost parallel to Epifanio de los Santos Avenue (EDSA) to the north, connecting Roxas Boulevard and Domestic Road near Bay City with the South Luzon Expressway near Newport City. It has an arterial extension continuing 3.4 kilometers (2.1 mi) northeast to 5th Avenue and McKinley Road in Bonifacio Global City, known as Lawton Avenue.

Andrews Avenue is also the main feeder to Ninoy Aquino International Airport from the east and west and is the main access road to Newport World Resorts (formerly Resorts World Manila).

== Route description ==
Andrews Avenue follows the old route of Nichols Road in Pasay and is split into three sections.

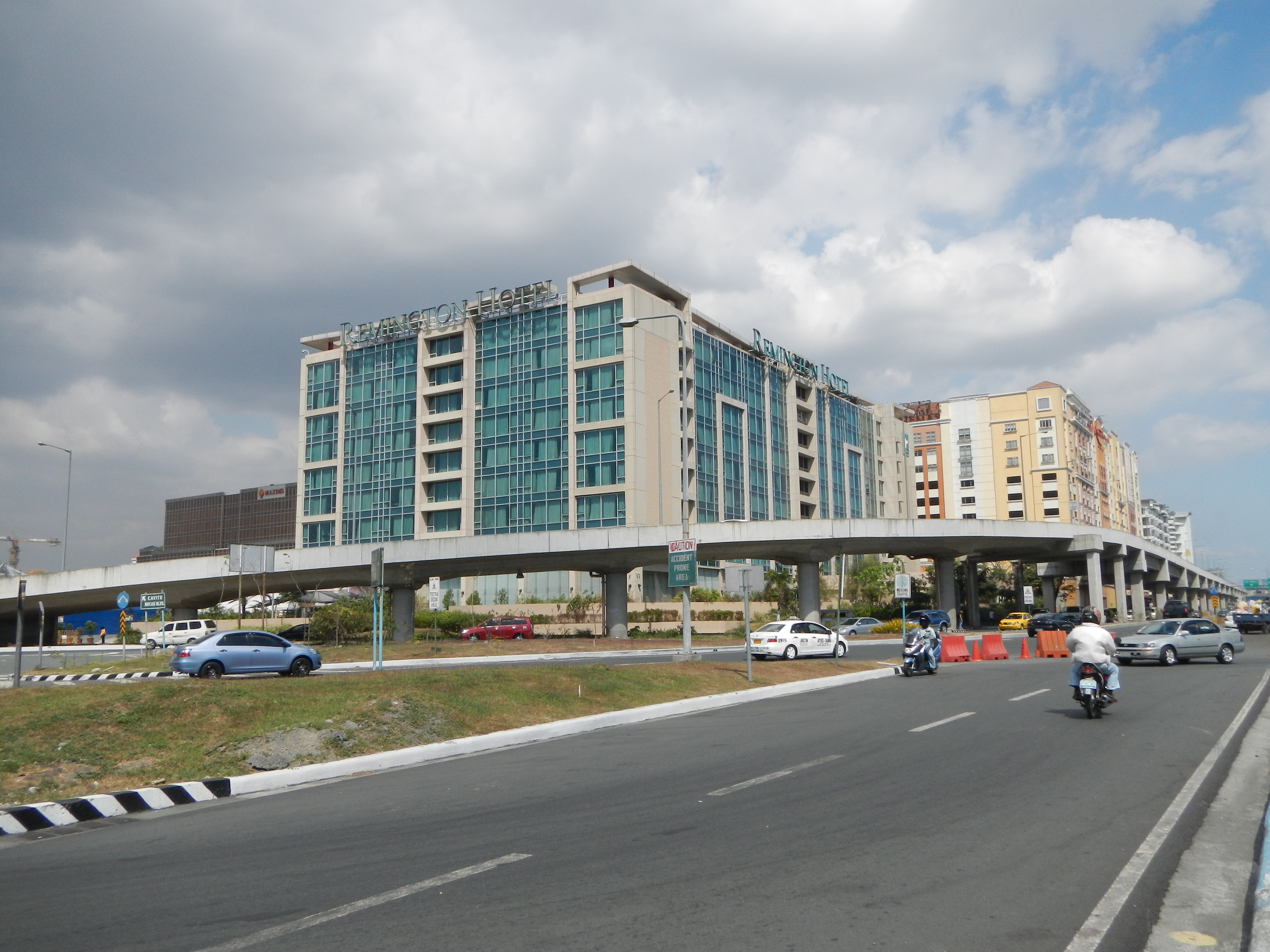
Sales Road section with the elevated Phase 1 of NAIA Expressway near Villamor Air Base (pictured in 2014), prior to the construction of the Phase 2 of NAIA Expressway

Sales Road

At its eastern terminus, the route begins as Sales Road at the Sales Interchange with the South Luzon Expressway. It is a continuation of Lawton Avenue from Fort Bonifacio via the Sales Bridge and a roundabout. It runs for approximately 900 meters (3,000 ft), heading southwesterly across the Villamor Air Base and Villamor Golf Course toward Ninoy Aquino International Airport (NAIA) Terminal 3. This section ends with another roundabout beneath the NAIA Expressway's off-ramp just before the road bends sharply to the west.

Andrews Avenue

The main section of Andrews Avenue is an eight-lane divided arterial that runs along the airport's northern perimeter. From the roundabout across from the Philippine Air Force Aerospace Museum, the avenue continues along the southern side of Newport City, a mixed-use development facing the NAIA Terminal 3. It passes the integrated resort complex of Newport World Resorts, the Star Cruises Centre and the Shrine of St. Therese before reaching a large roundabout, which used to have a prominent "egg structure" in the middle until 2015, called Circulo del Mundo. Access to the airport terminal is via this roundabout, which also serves as a boundary between Newport and the older barangays of Pasay. From the former Circulo down to the intersection with Domestic Road, the avenue is lined with airline offices, maintenance facilities including those of Philippine Airlines, and a few barangays in between. The Manila Light Rail Transit facilities are located at this intersection before the avenue becomes known as Airport Road.

Airport Road

West of Domestic Road and a small creek called Estero de Tripa de Gallina, the road enters the Baclaran area of Parañaque. The road narrows into a four-lane undivided road carrying one-way westbound traffic. The road meets its western terminus at Roxas Boulevard.

== Intersections ==
Province	City/Municipality	km	mi	Destinations	Notes
Taguig – Pasay boundary				Sales Interchange (eastern terminus as Sales Road; continues as Lawton Avenue)	
Pasay				AH 26 (N1) (South Luzon Expressway) / West Service Road	
Pasay				Parkside Road	Westbound access only.
Pasay				Newport Boulevard	Westbound access only.
Pasay				E6 (NAIA Expressway) – Makati, Alabang	Eastbound entrance. West end of Sales Road and east end of Andrews Avenue.
Pasay				E6 (NAIA Expressway) – Domestic Road	Westbound exit only.
Pasay				Resort Drive	Westbound access only.
Pasay				E6 (NAIA Expressway) – Macapagal Boulevard, Cavite	Westbound entrance and former eastbound exit.
Pasay				Resort Drive	Westbound entrance
Pasay				Circulo del Mundo Rotunda	
Pasay				E6 (NAIA Expressway) – Terminal 3	Westbound exit and eastbound exit.
Pasay				Tramo Street	Traffic light intersection. Access to AH 26 (N1) (EDSA).
Pasay				N193 (Domestic Road) / Bac III Drive	Road becomes one-way westbound. West end of Andrews Avenue and east end of Airport Road.
Tripa de Gallina Creek				Airport Bridge	
Parañaque				N62 (Elpidio Quirino Avenue); R-2	Traffic light intersection.
Parañaque				N61 (Roxas Boulevard); R-1	Traffic light intersection. Western terminus.
1.000 mi = 1.609 km; 1.000 km = 0.621 mi: Incomplete access

== History ==
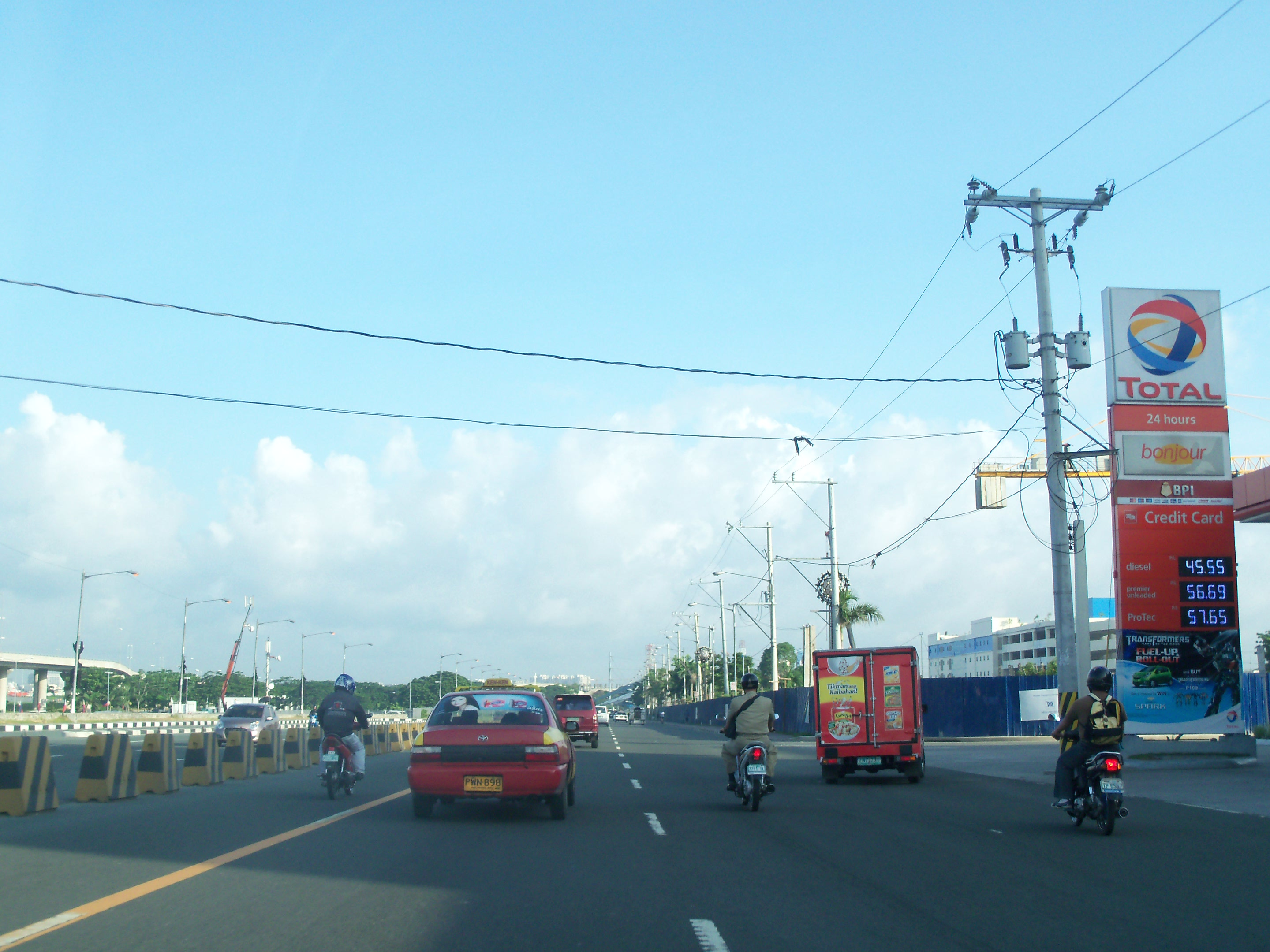
Andrews Avenue in Newport City area looking north, prior to the construction of the elevated NAIA Expressway, 2011

The avenue was formerly called Nichols Field Road, later shortened to Nichols Road, after the US air base in Pasay, which it served. Nichols Field, in turn, was named after Captain Henry E. Nichols, a US Navy commander of the monitor ship USS Monadnock during the Philippine–American War. The air base was built in 1912, and the road to Fort McKinley (now Fort Bonifacio) and Dewey Boulevard (now Roxas Boulevard) was constructed shortly thereafter. The whole stretch from Dewey to Fort McKinley was named Nichols Road.

At present, the Fort Bonifacio/Taguig portion is named Lawton Avenue. In Pasay, the longest portion has been renamed to Andrews Avenue in honor of Lt. General Frank Maxwell Andrews.

From 2004 to 2017, the NAIA Expressway was built above most of the road's Pasay portion. The Circulo del Mundo roundabout built on the avenue was opened to motorists in 2010, featuring its centerpiece, Layag Islas (Islands in Flight), which was constructed from September 2009 to December 2010 but was eventually dismantled in November 2014 due to public backlash over its perceived wastefulness.

On April 14, 2024, a sinkhole formed along Sales Road near Villamor Air Base Gate 3, forcing the temporary closure of its two innermost eastbound lanes. Initially a pothole, it expanded to approximately 3 meters (9.8 ft) in width and depth. On April 15, Maynilad Water Services reported that the sinkhole likely resulted from soil saturation due to a water leak from its secondary pipeline, with the company investigating potential external damage as the cause. SMC Infrastructure also investigated whether the sinkhole and the leak have compromised the integrity of the NAIA Expressway. It was finally covered on April 17.

== Points of interest ==
- Circulo del Mundo (demolished to make way for NAIA Expressway)
- Civil Aviation Authority of the Philippines
- Holiday Inn Express Manila Newport City
- Marriott Hotel Manila
- Maxims Hotel
- Newport Mall
- Newport World Resorts
- Ninoy Aquino International Airport Terminal 3
- Philippine Air Force Aerospace Museum
- Philippine Air Force General Hospital
- Sheraton Manila Hotel
- Shrine of St. Therese
- Star Cruises Centre
- Villamor Air Base
- Villamor Golf Course

== See also ==
- Lawton Avenue
- Nichols Field
- Media related to Andrews Avenue (Philippines) at Wikimedia Commons
