= Tramo Street =

Road in Pasay, Metro Manila, Philippines

Coordinates: 14°32′59″N 121°0′4″E

- Tramo Road; Aurora Boulevard
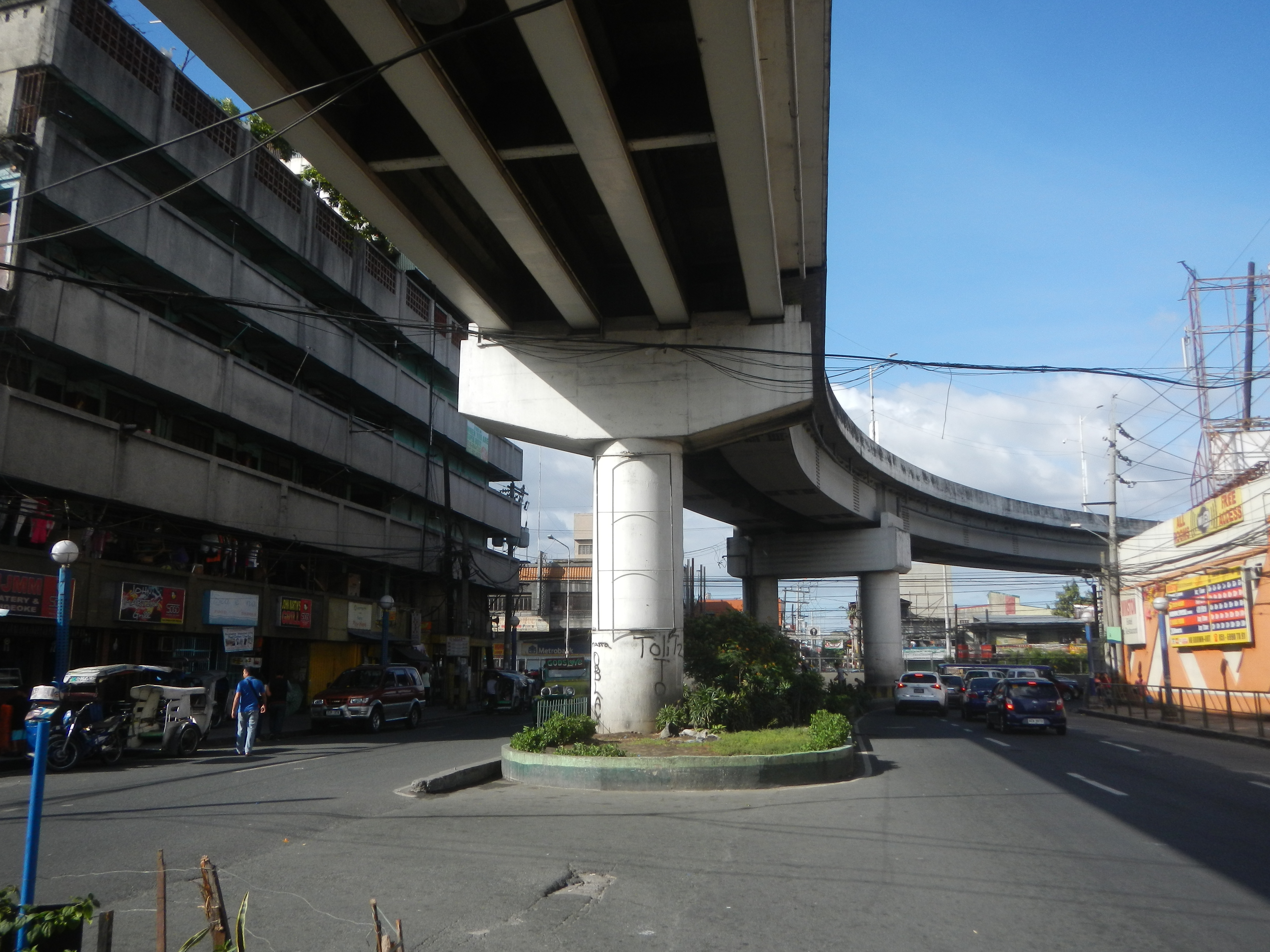
- The northern end of the Aurora Boulevard section at EDSA, below the Tramo Flyover above
- Interactive map of Tramo Street
- Maintained by: Department of Public Works and Highways (Note: DPWH maintenance covers Pasay sections only.)
- Length: 4.1 km (2.5 mi)
- North end: Ocampo Street in Manila (as F. Muñoz Street)
- Major junctions: as Tramo Street: N190 (Gil Puyat Avenue); Arnaiz Avenue; AH 26 (N1) (EDSA)
- South end: N192 (Andrews Avenue) in Pasay (as Aurora Boulevard)

Tramo Street is a major local road in Pasay, Metro Manila, Philippines. It runs north-south from Ocampo Street, which is on the border with Malate, Manila, to Andrews Avenue in Maricaban. It is interrupted by Epifanio de los Santos Avenue (EDSA) and the MRT Line 3, which divides the road into two sections. The southern section from EDSA to Andrews Avenue has been renamed Aurora Boulevard.

The street's name is Spanish for branch or line, referring to the Cavite Line, a branch of the Manila tranvía (tramo del tranvía).

== History ==
Tramo Street follows the abandoned line (the Cavite Line) of the Manila Railroad Company (now Philippine National Railways) that stretched from Paco to Naic, Cavite. The Cavite Line was built in 1908, and train services ceased in 1936. Subsequent development of Manila International Airport led to the closure of a large segment of the old line in Pasay and Parañaque. The line resumes in La Huerta, where it is still named Tramo Road, running 4.6 kilometers (2.9 mi) to C-5 Extension in Las Piñas and continues as Fruto Santos Avenue. Streets of the same name, also occupying the former right-of-way of the old railroad line, are found in Bacoor, Tanza, and Naic in Cavite.

Until its opening in 2003, the EDSA-Tramo flyover was constructed along EDSA and the street's Aurora Boulevard section in Pasay to provide westbound motorists from the former with direct access to the latter. In the early 2020s, the Tramo on-ramp to the NAIA Expressway was constructed at the middle of Aurora Boulevard until it was opened in 2024.

== Intersections ==
Province	City/Municipality	km	mi	Destinations	Notes
Manila				Pablo Ocampo Street	Northern terminus.
Manila – Pasay boundary				Zobel Roxas Street	North end of DPWH maintenance and south end of F. Muñoz Street.
Pasay				N190 (Gil Puyat Avenue)	Opposite directions provided by U-turn slot.
Pasay				G. Villanueva Street	
Pasay				Arnaiz Avenue	
Pasay				Protacio Street	
Pasay				Vergel Street	
Pasay				AH 26 (N1) (EDSA)	No access to opposite directions.
Pasay				South end of EDSA–Tramo Flyover	
Pasay				Don Carlos Revilla Road	Southbound access only. Access to Pasay City Cemetery.
Pasay				E6 (NAIA Expressway) – Terminal 1, Terminal 2, Cavite, Macapagal Boulevard	Southbound entrance to NAIAX westbound.
Tripa de Gallina Creek				Tramo Bridge	
Pasay				St. Mary Street	Access to Maricaban Village.
Pasay				St. Augustine Street	Access to Maricaban Village.
Pasay				N192 (Andrews Avenue) – Terminal 3	Southern terminus. Traffic light intersection.
1.000 mi = 1.609 km; 1.000 km = 0.621 mi: Incomplete access
