= Domestic Road =

Major road in Pasay, Philippines

Coordinates: 14°31′19″N 121°0′2″E

- Domestic Airport Road
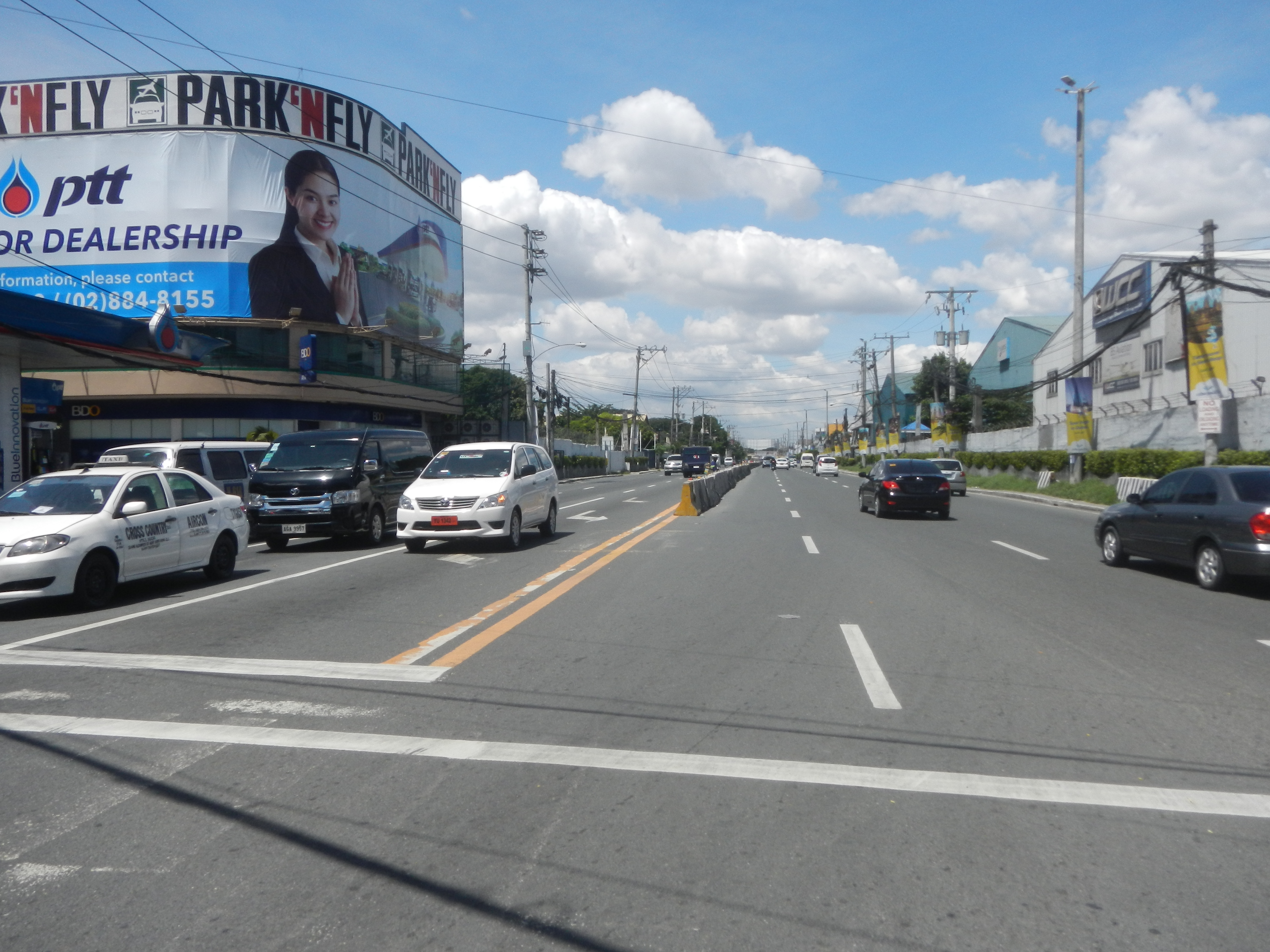
- Domestic Road near NAIA Terminal 4
- Interactive map of Domestic Road
- Namesake: Manila Domestic Airport
- Maintained by: Department of Public Works and Highways - South Manila District Engineering Office
- Length: 1.171 km (0.728 mi)
- Location: Pasay
- North end: N192 (Andrews Avenue)
- South end: N63 (NAIA Road)

The Domestic Road, also known as the Domestic Airport Road, is a 1.171-kilometer (0.728 mi) major road in Pasay, Metro Manila, Philippines that links Andrews Avenue from the north to the NAIA Road in the south. It forms the short northwestern perimeter of Ninoy Aquino International Airport (NAIA), and its alignment is north–south running parallel to Roxas Boulevard and the NAIA Expressway above Electrical Road to the west. It is named after NAIA Terminal 4, also known as Manila Domestic Airport, found along the road until 2025. Also located on this short road are the Cebu Pacific Airlines Operation Center, Airlink International Aviation School, Salem Commercial Complex and a Park N' Fly.

== See also ==
- NAIA Expressway
- Media related to Domestic Road at Wikimedia Commons
