= Sales Interchange =

Road interchange in Metro Manila, Philippines

- Nichols Interchange
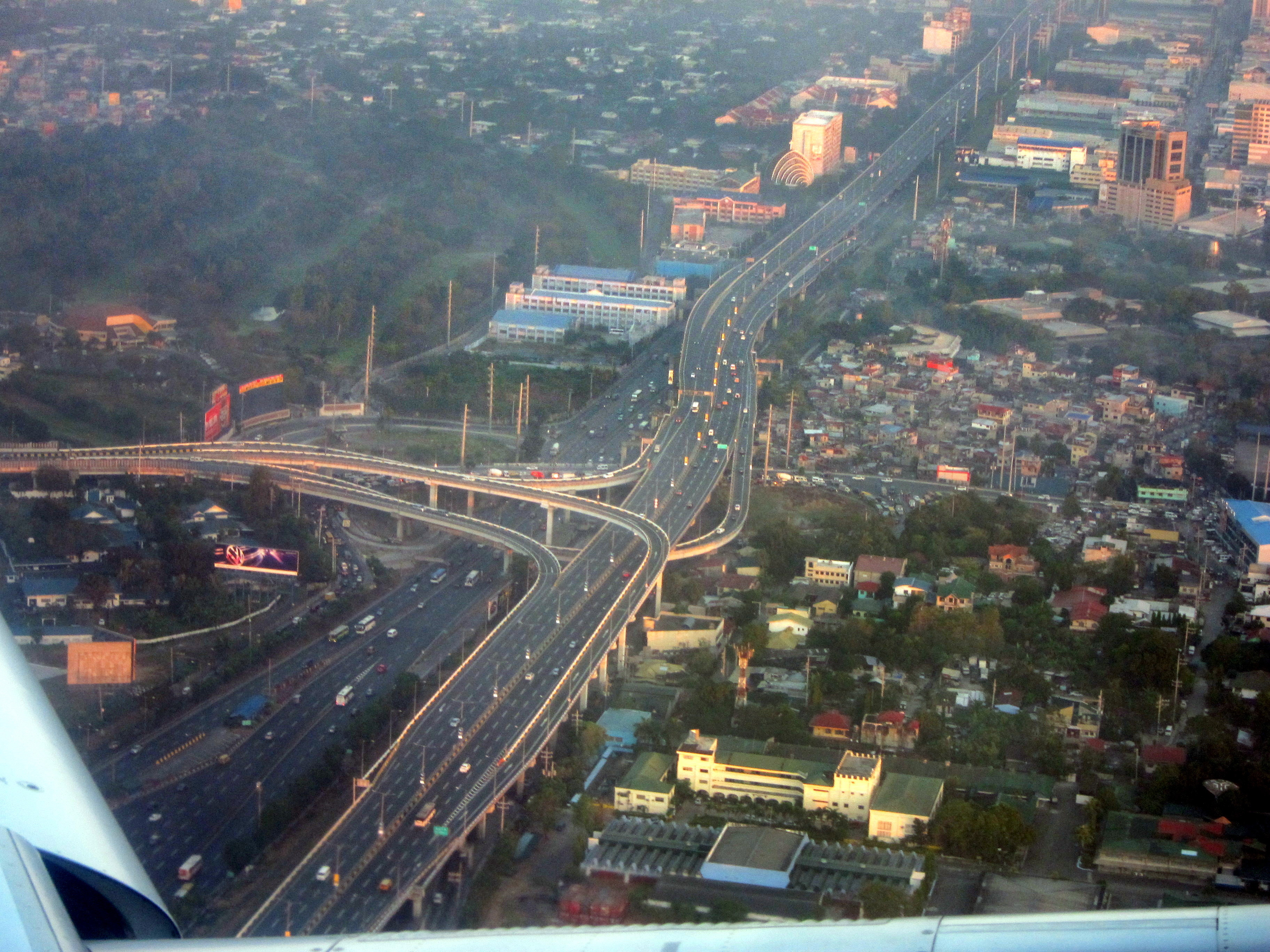
- The Sales Interchange in 2014, looking north from the South Luzon Expressway. Picture taken from an Airbus A320.
- Interactive map of Sales Interchange

Location
- Barangay 183, Pasay and Western Bicutan, Taguig, Metro Manila, Philippines
- Coordinates: 14°31′27.6″N 121°1′32.7″E
- Roads at junction: Lower/at-grade interchange: AH26 (South Luzon Expressway); N192 (Sales Road); Lawton Avenue; West Service Road; East Service Road Upper interchange: AH26 (Skyway); E6 (NAIA Expressway)

Construction
- Type: Four-level hybrid partial cloverleaf (lower) and Directional T (upper) interchange
- Constructed: Upper interchange: 2004–2009 by the Department of Public Works and Highways
- Opened: Early 1970s (Lower/at-grade interchange); May 30, 2009 (Upper interchange)
- Maintained by: Department of Public Works and Highways; Skyway Operations and Maintenance Corporation

The Sales Interchange (Tagalog: [ˈsalɛs]), also known as the Nichols Interchange or Villamor Interchange, is a hybrid interchange at the boundary of Pasay and Taguig in Metro Manila, Philippines. It is composed of a lower partial cloverleaf interchange serving as the junction between the South Luzon Expressway, Sales Road, Lawton Avenue, West Service Road and East Service Road and an upper Directional T serving as the junction between the Skyway and the NAIA Expressway, thus also known as Skyway's NAIAX Exit.

The interchange was opened in two segments, with the lower interchange being built in the early 1970s. Rehabilitation work on the lower interchange was last undertaken in 2012 with the reconfiguration of an off-ramp to improve access to Ninoy Aquino International Airport and the strengthening of the Sales Bridge brought about by the number of vehicles using the interchange. Although the rehabilitation was scheduled to be completed by August 13, 2012, it was ultimately finished in February 2013.

Construction of the upper interchange was recommended in the Metro Manila Urban Transportation Integration Study (MMUTIS), commissioned by the Japan International Cooperation Agency (JICA) in 1999, as a solution to worsening traffic congestion into and out of the airport. However, no provisions for its construction were made when the Metro Manila Skyway was being built. On July 17, 2001, President Gloria Macapagal Arroyo and her Cabinet approved the construction of the NAIA Expressway, funded through a Japanese loan package, and construction of the upper interchange began on March 17, 2004. The ₱1 billion interchange, which was built in four parts, was inaugurated by President Arroyo and other officials on May 30, 2009.

The Sales Interchange is the last exit in the toll-free section of the South Luzon Expressway, although this is true only for the lower interchange. The upper interchange was free of charge until November 16, 2011, when tolls began to be collected by Citra Metro Manila Tollways Corporation (CMMTC), the concessionaire of the Skyway system.
