= Lawton Avenue =

Road in Taguig, Philippines

Coordinates: 14°32′0″N 121°2′12″E

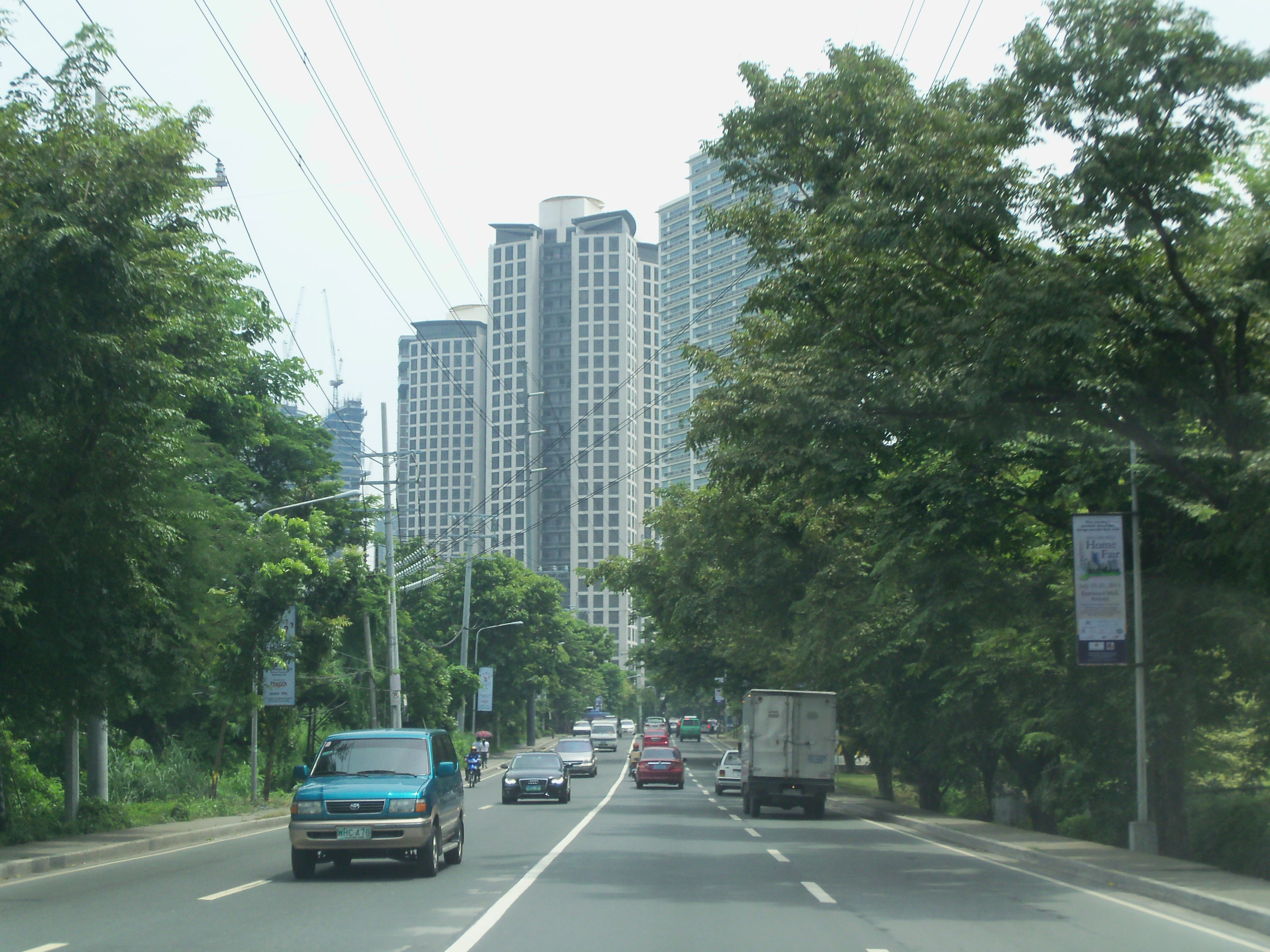
- Lawton Avenue looking north from McKinley Hill
- Interactive map of Lawton Avenue
- Namesake: Henry Ware Lawton
- Type: Tertiary road
- Maintained by: Department of Public Works and Highways
- Length: 3.4 km (2.1 mi)
- West end: Sales Interchange in Pasay–Taguig boundary
- Major junctions: AH 26 (E2) (South Luzon Expressway); Chino Roces Avenue; Bayani Road; Upper McKinley Road
- East end: 5th Avenue in Taguig

Lawton Avenue, also known as Fort Bonifacio–Nichols Field Road and Nichols Field Road, is the main road in Fort Bonifacio, Taguig, Metro Manila, Philippines. It follows a part of the alignment of the old Nichols route running roughly southwest to northeast from Sales Interchange to 5th Avenue and the Manila American Cemetery and Memorial. It is named after Henry Ware Lawton, a U.S. Army general killed during the Philippine–American War.

== Route description ==
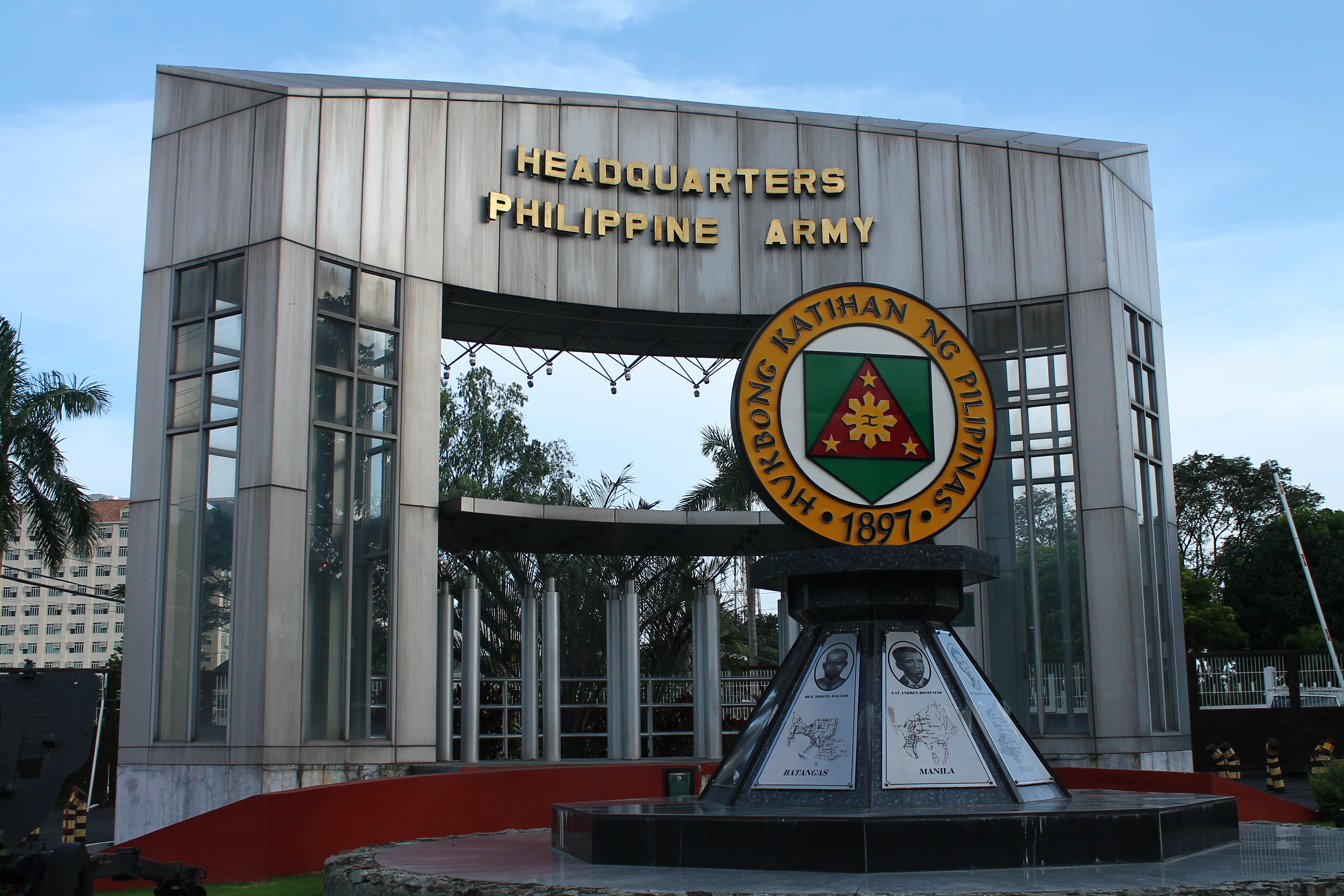
Philippine Army Headquarters on Lawton Avenue

Starting at the Sales Interchange in Pasay nearing its boundary with Taguig, the avenue heads east and crosses the South Luzon Expressway and PNR South Main Line railroad tracks. It enters Taguig, where it meets the intersection with Chino Roces Avenue Extension (formerly Pasong Tamo Extension) near the entrance to the Fort Andres Bonifacio at Gate 3. It continues across army property, winding past the Philippine Naval Hospital and Kagitingan Executive Golf Course and intersecting with Bayani Road. At Upper McKinley Road, Lawton traverses the McKinley Hill mixed-use development and the Philippine Army Headquarters, bending sharply north as it skirts the western side of Manila American Cemetery. The avenue ends at a fork in the road with 5th Avenue to the west, which leads to Bonifacio Global City, and Old Lawton Road to the east, which leads to the American Cemetery entrance.

The extension of 8th Avenue north of Kalayaan Avenue between Bonifacio Global City and J.P. Rizal Avenue in Taguig (formerly Makati) is also named Lawton Avenue. West of the Nichols interchange, the avenue continues as Sales Road and Andrews Avenue, heading towards Pasay, the Villamor Air Base, and Ninoy Aquino International Airport.

== Expansion ==
As part of the Duterte administration's Build! Build! Build! Infrastructure Program, the avenue was expanded from four lanes (two lanes per direction) to six lanes (three lanes per direction). The project spans 3.1 kilometers (1.9 mi) and is divided into two phases. The road widening project is complemented by the construction of the Santa Monica-Lawton Bridge and the expected influx of vehicles once the bridge is opened. When completed, the travel time between Bonifacio Global City and Ninoy Aquino International Airport will be reduced by about 40%, and the road will accommodate more vehicles. Construction began on August 21, 2017, and the first phase, spanning 1.34 kilometers (0.83 mi), was opened on November 17, 2020. The road widening project is expected to be fully completed in September 2021.

== Intersections ==
| Province | City/Municipality | km | mi | Destinations | Notes |
|---|---|---|---|---|---|
| Taguig – Pasay boundary | | | | Sales Interchange (western terminus; continues as Andrews Avenue) | |
| Taguig | | | | AH 26 (N1) (South Luzon Expressway) | Westbound entrance. |
| Taguig | | | | East Service Road | Traffic light intersection. |
| Taguig | | | | Chino Roces Avenue / G. Juliano Avenue | Traffic light intersection. |
| Taguig | | | | Karangalan Road | Traffic light intersection. Access to Jose Francisco Naval Station. |
| Taguig | | | | Bayani Road | Traffic light intersection. |
| Taguig | | | | McWest Boulevard / Upper McKinley Road | Traffic light intersection. Access to McKinley Hill. |
| Taguig | | | | 5th Avenue | Eastern terminus. Continues to Bonifacio Global City as 5th Avenue. |
1.000 mi = 1.609 km; 1.000 km = 0.621 mi: Incomplete access

== Landmarks ==
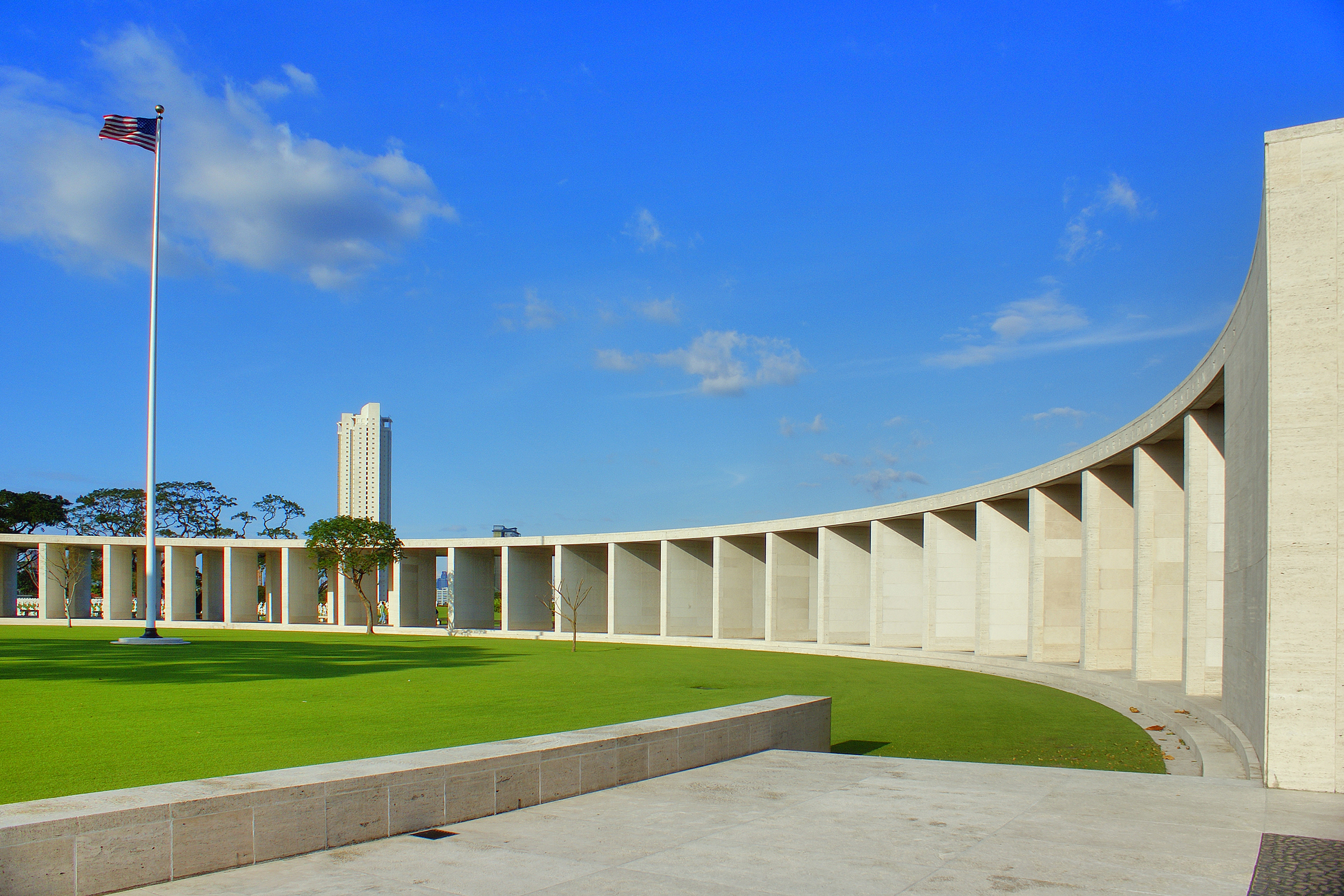
Manila American Cemetery and Memorial

This is from east to west:

- Fifth Avenue Place
- Manila American Cemetery
- McKinley West
- McKinley Hill
- Fort Andres Bonifacio
- Bonifacio Heights
- National Mapping and Resource Information Authority
- Philippine Army Headquarters
- Southern Police District Headquarters
- Philippine Marine Corps Headquarters
- Philippine Navy Naval Station (Bonifacio Naval Station)
- Gate 3 Plaza
- Nichols station
- Sales Interchange
