= Macapagal Boulevard =

Road in Metro Manila, Philippines

Coordinates: 14°31′44″N 120°59′23″E

- President Diosdado Macapagal Boulevard; Macapagal Avenue
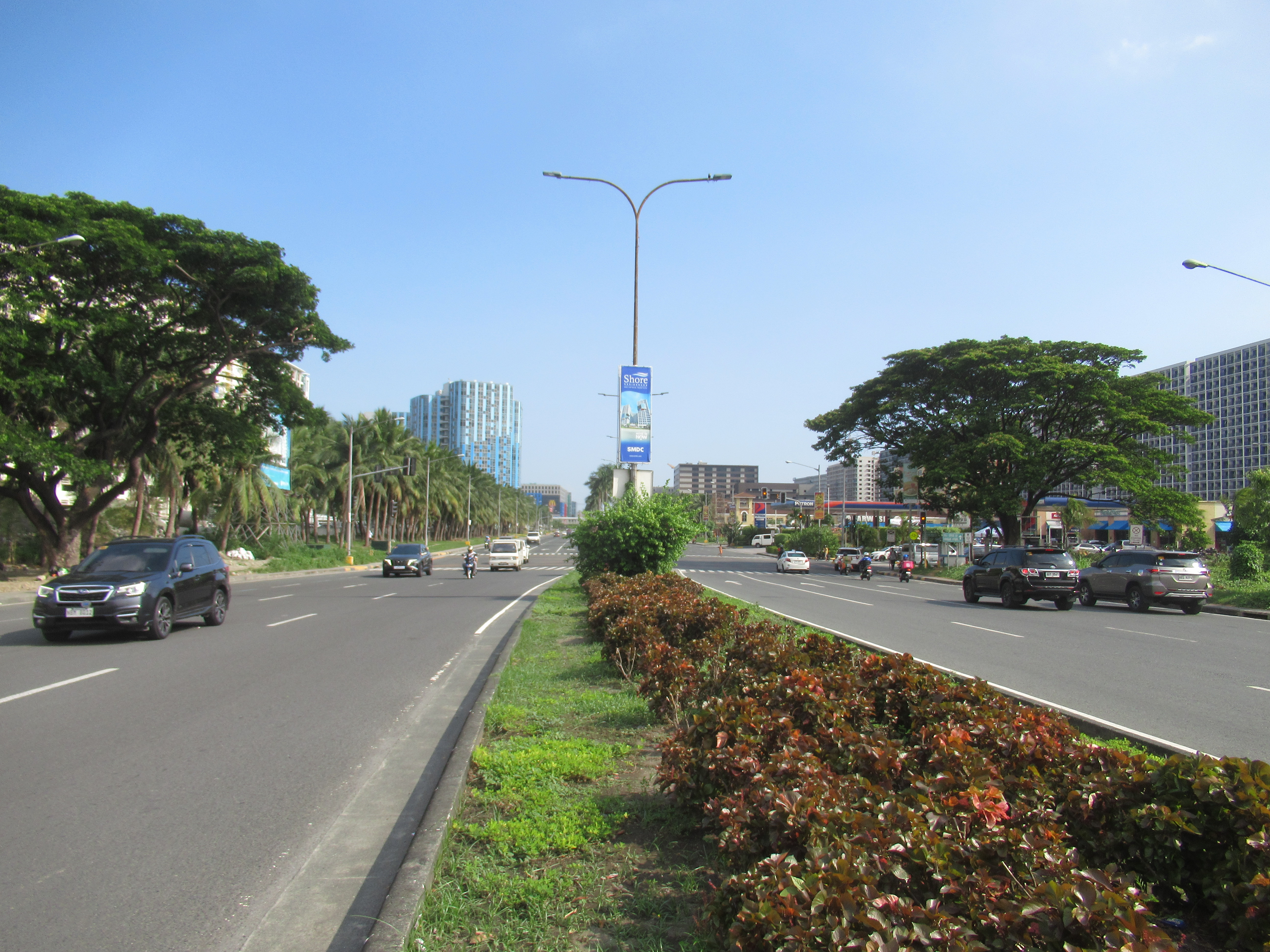
- Macapagal Boulevard in Central Business Park I-A, Pasay
- Interactive map of Macapagal Boulevard
- Namesake: Diosdado Macapagal
- Maintained by: Philippine Reclamation Authority (Note: Philippine Reclamation Authority maintains Macapagal Boulevard's section from the Redemptorist Channel to the former site of Uniwide Coastal Mall in Parañaque.) and Department of Public Works and Highways – South Manila District Engineering Office (Note: The Department of Public Works and Highways through its South Manila District Engineering Office maintains Macapagal Boulevard's national tertiary road section from Jose W. Diokno Boulevard to the Libertad Channel in Pasay.)
- Length: 5.38 km (3.34 mi); Approximate length
- Location: Pasay and Parañaque
- North end: Gil Puyat Avenue Extension in Pasay
- Major junctions: Epifanio de los Santos Avenue; Bradco Drive; Asean Avenue (Solaire Boulevard); E6 (NAIA Expressway); Seaside Drive
- South end: Asiaworld, Don Galo, Parañaque

Construction
- Construction start: 2000
- Inauguration: April 5, 2002

Macapagal Boulevard, also known as President Diosdado Macapagal Boulevard and Macapagal Avenue, is an eight-lane road in Metro Manila, Philippines, running parallel to Roxas Boulevard from the Cultural Center of the Philippines Complex in Pasay to Asia World City in Parañaque. It is named after former Philippine President Diosdado Macapagal. This road has three major bridges, crossing the 'channels', of which the largest is the Libertad Channel, where the Libertad Water Pumping Station is situated. After the intersection reconfiguring around EDSA to relieve traffic, Macapagal Boulevard is now often used to access the SM Mall of Asia to the north and Cavite to the south. It is also the main major road in Metro Manila's reclamation area, Bay City.

== Route description ==
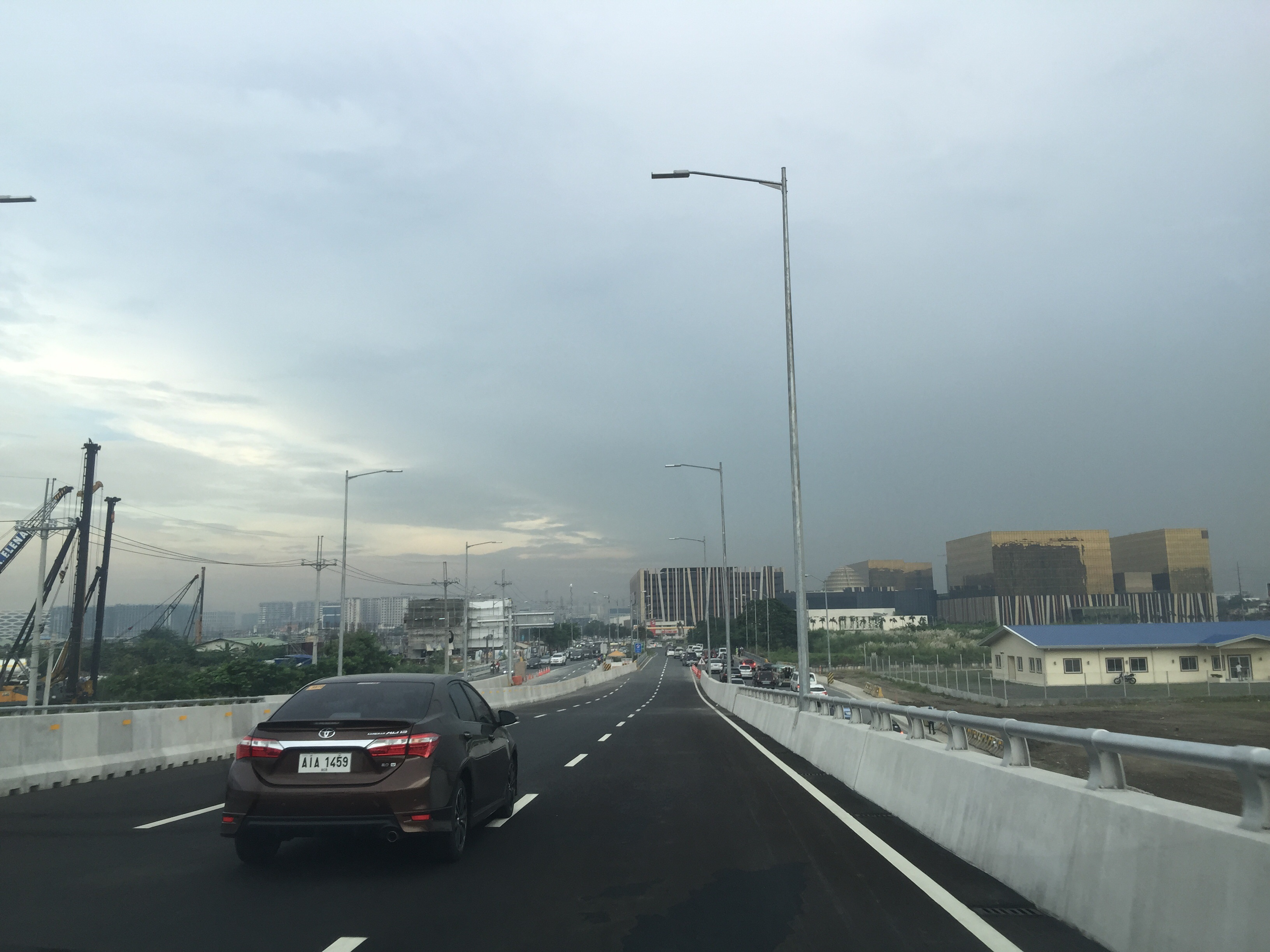
Macapagal Boulevard northbound as seen from the NAIA Expressway off-ramp

Macapagal Boulevard commences at the intersection with Gil Puyat Avenue Extension near the Cultural Center of the Philippines Complex in Pasay as the logical continuation of Magdalena Jalandoni Street. It heads south across Financial Center consisting of the World Trade Center Metro Manila at the intersection and the Philippine National Bank headquarters. South of the Libertad channel, the boulevard enters Central Business Park 1-A, the location of Metropolitan Park and the SM Central Business Park, intersecting with Epifanio de los Santos Avenue (EDSA) before entering the Aseana City development. At Asean Avenue, Macapagal traverses the Entertainment City gaming complex with Solaire Resort & Casino and City of Dreams Manila (formerly Belle Grande Manila), dominating this stretch to Seaside Drive, an extension of NAIA Road. Near the Seaside Boulevard junction at Central Business Park 2 are the NAIA Expressway ramps that provide access to Ninoy Aquino International Airport and connect it to the Metro Manila Skyway. It crosses Pacific Avenue near Marina Baytown East village, where most traffic turns left towards the Manila–Cavite Expressway. Macapagal Boulevard ends at the southern coast of Asiaworld, with the Las Piñas–Parañaque Critical Habitat and Ecotourism Area as the terminating vista.

== Intersections ==
Intersections are numbered by kilometer post, with Rizal Park in Manila designated as kilometer 0. The kilometer count is discontinuous.

Province	City/Municipality	km	mi	Destinations	Notes
Parañaque				Pacific Avenue	Southern terminus. Access to NAIA Expressway (NAIAX), Seaside Drive, Pacific Avenue, and Manila–Cavite Expressway (CAVITEX).
Parañaque				Seaside Drive	Traffic light intersection.
Parañaque				E6 (NAIA Expressway) – Airport, Skyway	Northbound exit and southbound entrance
Parañaque				V. Almario Avenue, Belle Avenue	Traffic light intersection. Access to Ayala Malls Manila Bay.
Parañaque				Asean Avenue (Aseana Avenue)	Traffic light intersection.
Parañaque				A. Luz Drive, L. Celerio Drive	No access to opposite directions.
Parañaque				B. Cabrera Drive, L. Celerio Drive	No access to opposite directions.
Parañaque				Bradco Avenue	Traffic light intersection.
Parañaque				Valera Drive, Ultura Drive	No access to opposite directions.
Redemptorist Channel					
Pasay				Coral Way	Traffic light intersection.
Pasay				DD Meridian Avenue	Northbound entrance only.
Pasay				Epifanio de los Santos Avenue (EDSA) Extension	Traffic light intersection. Access to SM Mall of Asia.
Pasay				Seaside Boulevard	Traffic light intersection.
Libertad Channel				D. Macapagal Bridge	
Pasay				N190 (Gil Puyat Avenue)	Northern terminus. Continues to CCP Complex as Magdalena Jalandoni Street.
1.000 mi = 1.609 km; 1.000 km = 0.621 mi: Incomplete access

== Landmarks ==
- Ayala Malls Manila Bay
- Blue Bay Walk
- City of Dreams Manila
- Dampa Seafood Market
- Department of Foreign Affairs–Office of Consular Affairs Building
- DoubleDragon Plaza
- HK Sun Plaza
- Hobbies of Asia
- Icon Hotel
- Manila Tytana Colleges
- Marina Bay Village
- Met Live Mall (built on the former site of Blue Wave Macapagal)
- Parañaque Integrated Terminal Exchange
- Philippine National Bank Financial Center
- Sentosia Condominiums
- W Mall
- World Trade Center Metro Manila
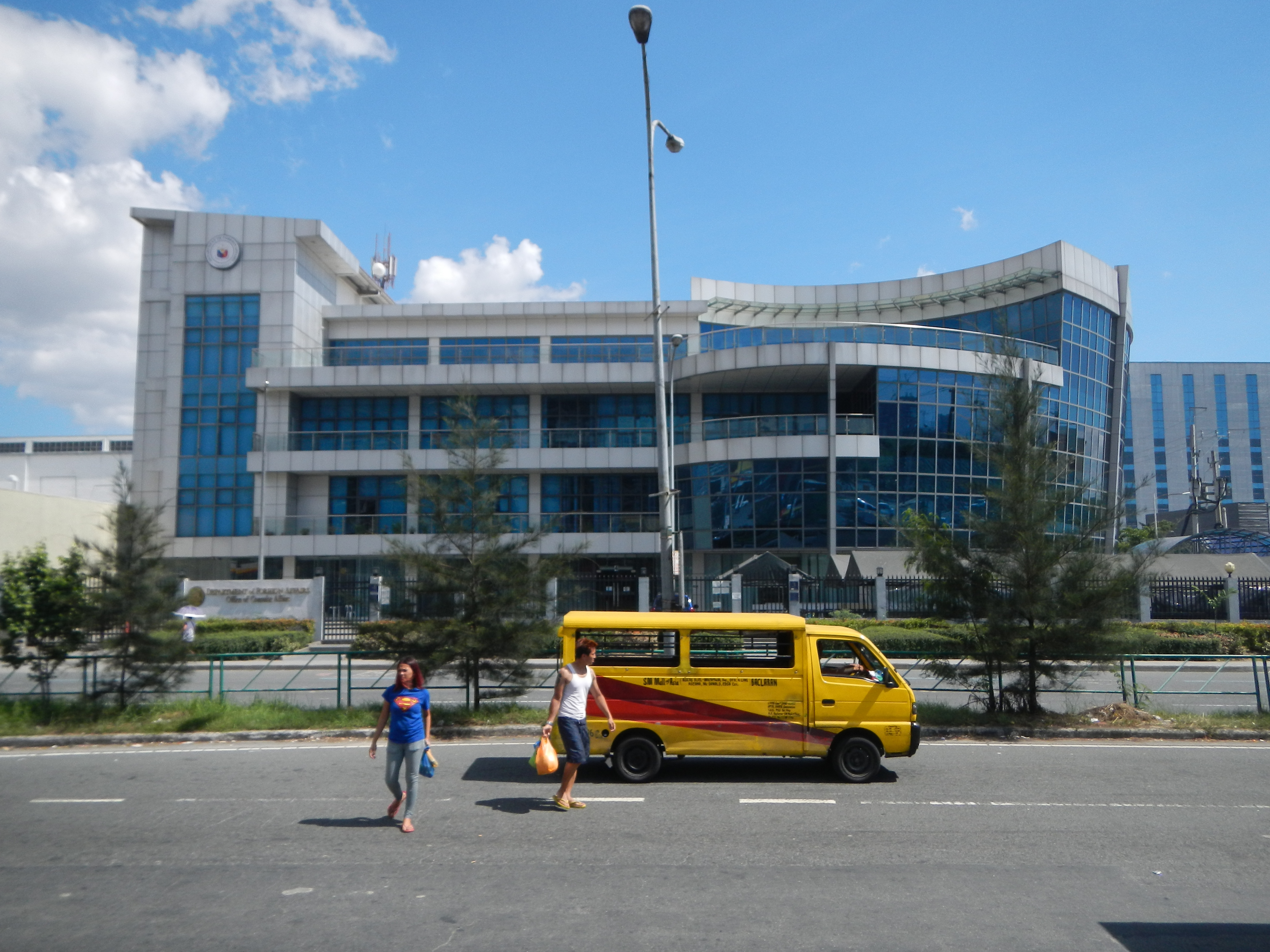
Department of Foreign Affairs–Office of Consular Affairs Building

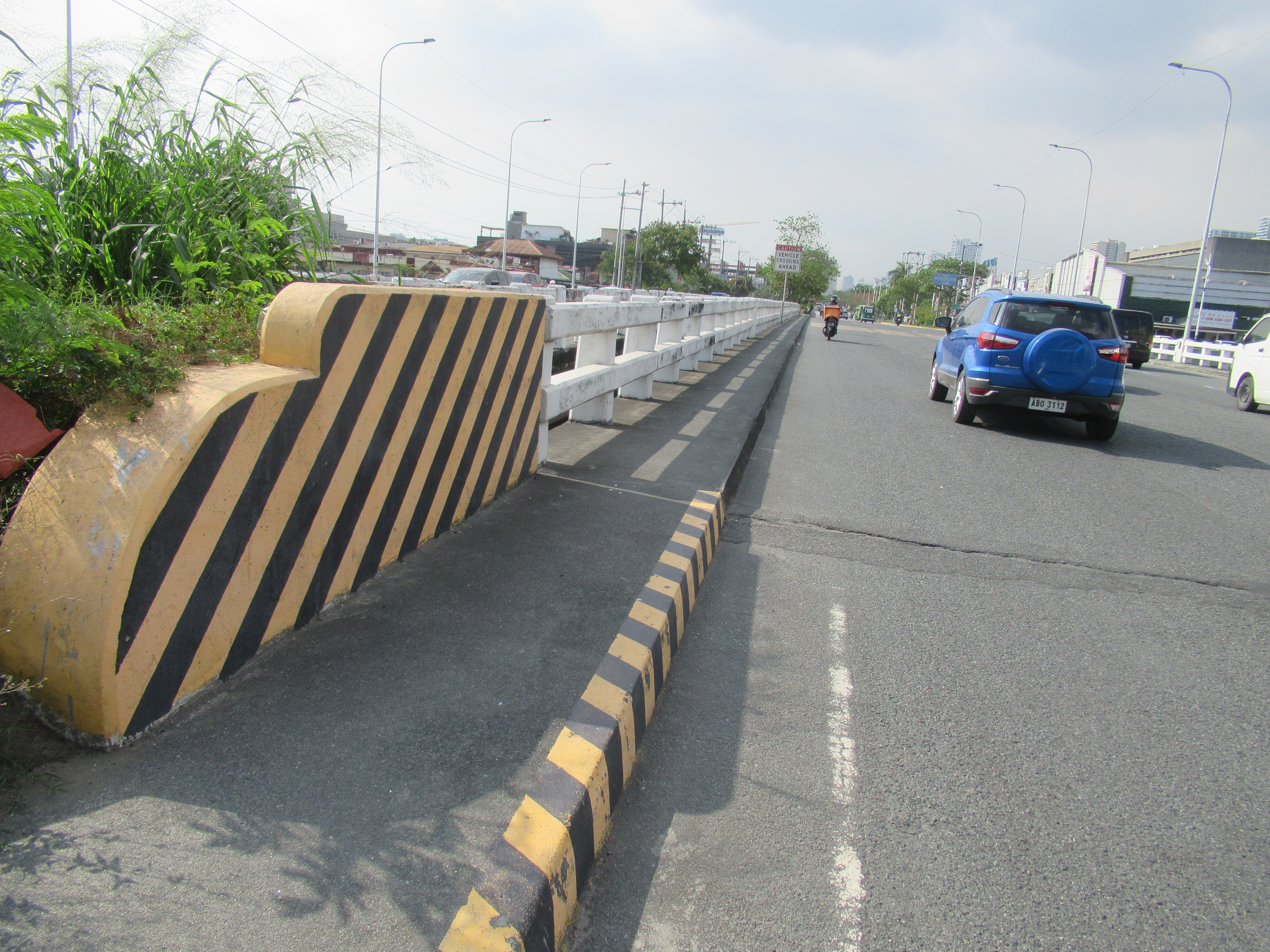
Doña Eva Macapagal Bridge

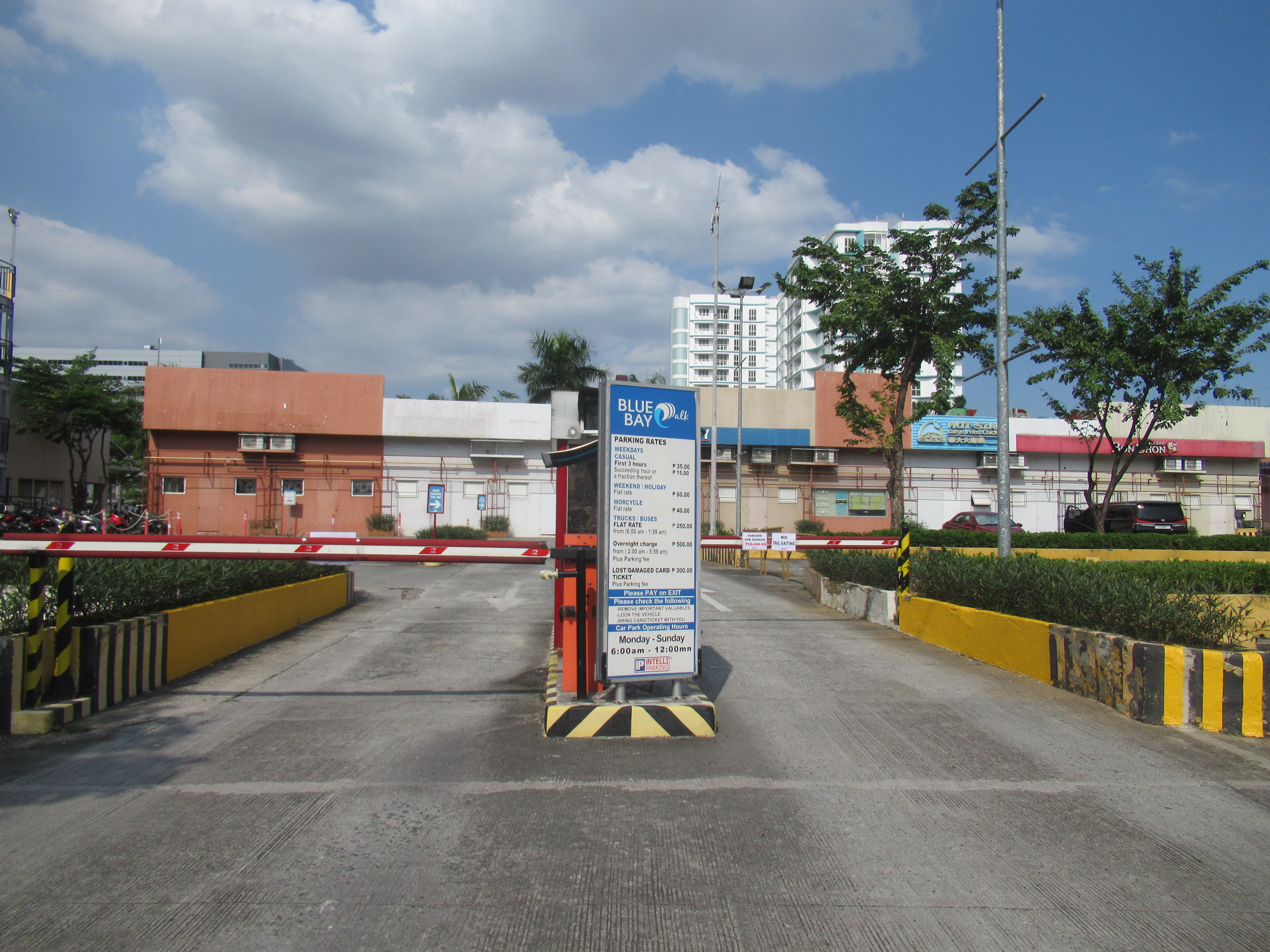
Blue Bay Walk Pasay

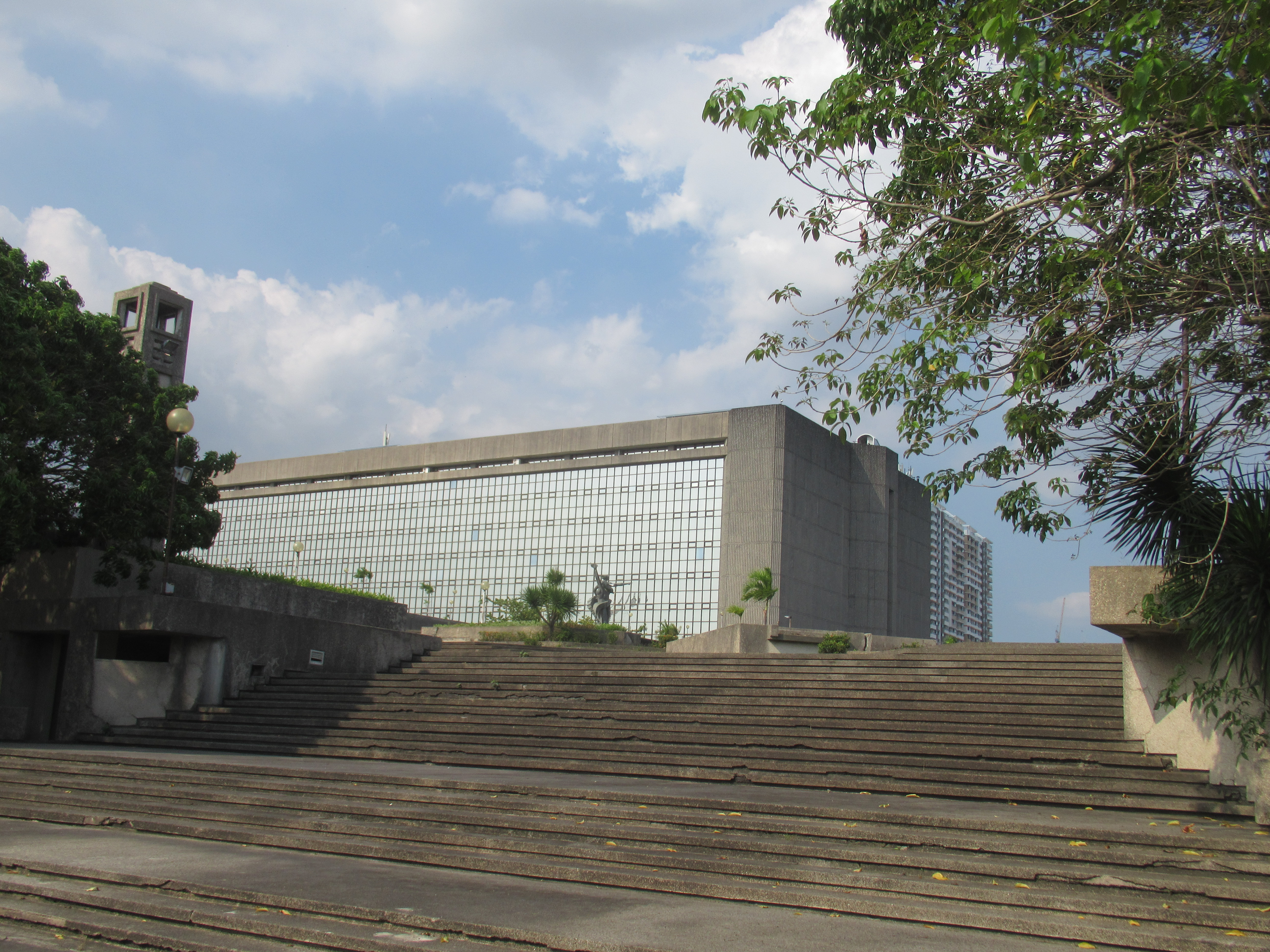
Philippine National Bank

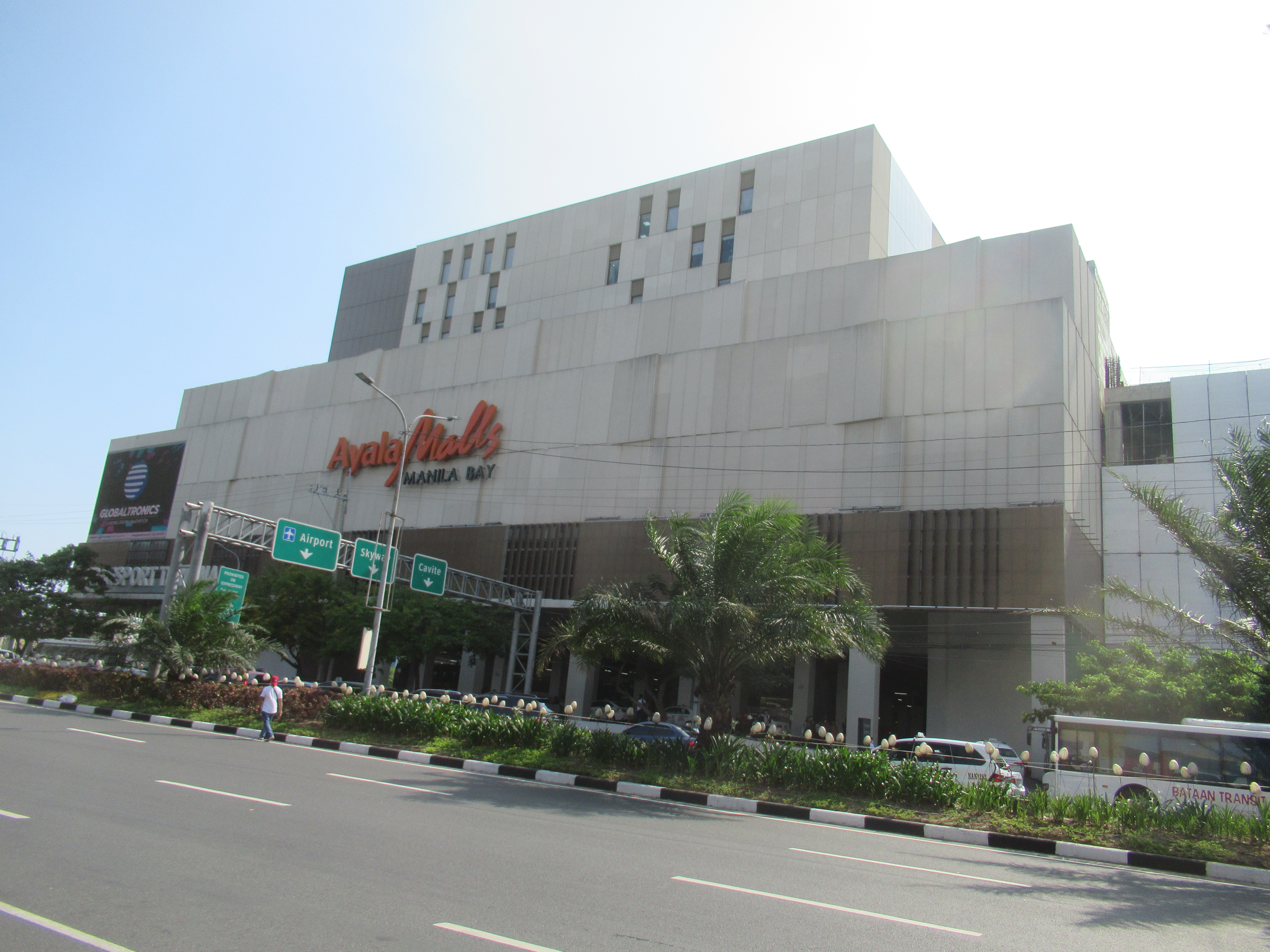
Ayala Malls Manila Bay

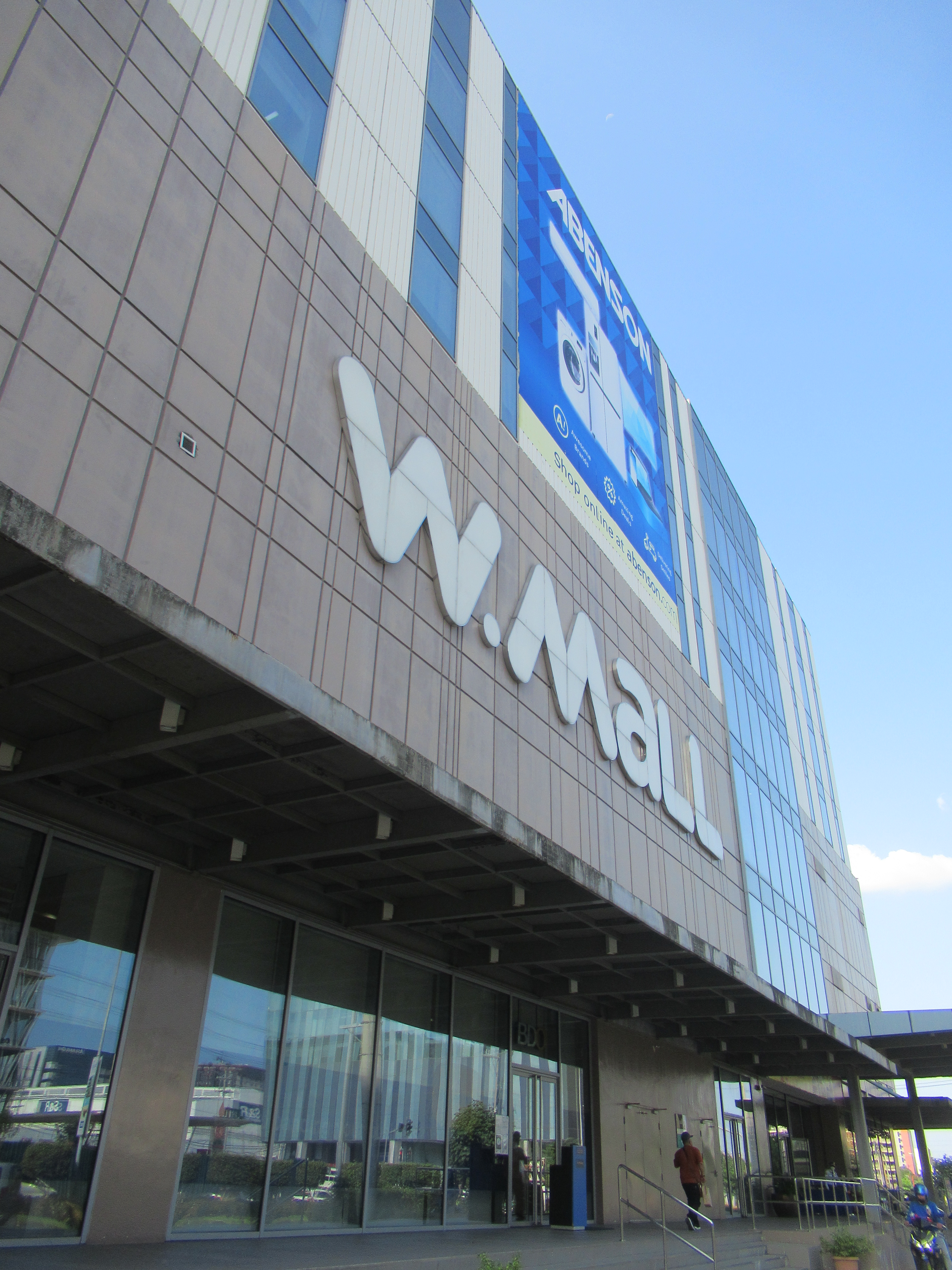
W Mall
